= Karlie Noon =

Australian astronomer

Karlie Alinta Noon is the first Indigenous Australian woman to graduate with a double degree in maths and physics; she is an astronomer, multiple award winner, 2019 Eureka Prize nominee, and one of the 2017 BBC's 100 Women. She researches astronomy and astrophysics at the Australian National University.

== Early life ==
Noon was raised in Coledale, a suburb of Tamworth, the country music centre of Australia, with a significant disparity between people of different economic classes. She describes herself as being "a poor, Aboriginal kid; this definitely influenced my experience of the education system and just not being seen in it." She describes her "terrible attendance rate" at high school, and succeeding in science due to tutoring and the help of a mentor. Support and encouragement from her close family, and in particular her grandmother, allowed her to have the confidence to seek a career in science.

== Education and career ==
Noon found traditional schooling and education in high school to be not suited to her, and received much of her early maths training from a mentor who came to her house. She then obtained her double degree from the University of Newcastle and then moved to studying at ANU, Canberra. Noon then worked for CSIRO’s Indigenous STEM program. Her research has involved understanding the sophisticated astronomic knowledge deeply embedded within Indigenous culture as well as sifting through European and Indigenous accounts of moon haloes.

== Awards, honours and recognition ==
- 2023 — Astronomy: Sky Country winner, Victorian Premier's Literary Awards People's Choice Award and shortlisted, Victorian Premier's Literary Award for Indigenous Writing
- 2022 — Astronomy: Sky Country shortlisted for the 2022 nonfiction Age Book of the Year.
- 2019 — She was a finalist at the Eureka Prizes for 3M ‘Emerging Leader in Science’.
- 2019 — Noon made the honour roll for Australian of the Year.
- 2018 — contributor to the "Made Beautiful by Nature" series of stories.
- 2017 — voted one of BBC's 100 Women.
- 2017 — STEM Professional Early Career Award finalist.
- 2017 — Women of the Future Finalist.

== Media and science communications ==
Noon has a history of science communication, hoping to open the door to STEM for people from minorities. She was reported in the Northern Daily Leader as saying "I want to push the idea that anybody can achieve a career in STEM, everyone has the right to equal opportunities, including young women, including young Aboriginal and Torres Strait Islander people". Noon has worked with the CSIRO to find candidates for the Indigenous STEM awards. Noon has worked to inspire other young children to engage in STEM, including Indigenous people and people from lower socioeconomic groups. She has also advocated that women and girls are capable in science and encourages diversity in STEM. "Girls can absolutely do it and they can smash it just as well as any other person can." Noon's work has involved encouraging Indigenous people to study and work in STEM careers.

In August 2020 the Sydney Observatory appointed Noon their inaugural astronomy ambassador.

- Noon’s work on Indigenous astronomy was featured on SBS.
- Her work on Indigenous science, discovery and equity was described on Australia’s Science Channel.
- Her biography and work on astronomy was described in the Indigenous Science Network Bulletin.
- In 2016 the ABC described her work in Indigenous physics as "reaching for the stars".

== Publications ==
- ——; De Napoli, Krystal (2022). Astronomy: Sky Country. Thames & Hudson. ISBN 9781760762162.
