= Gender dysphoria =

Mental distress due to gender incongruence

- Other names: Gender incongruence Formerly: Gender identity disorder
- Specialty: Psychiatry
- Symptoms: Distress related to one's assigned gender, sex or sex characteristics
- Complications: Eating disorders, suicide, depression, anxiety, social isolation
- Differential diagnosis: Variance in gender identity or expression that is not distressing, psychotic disorders, body dysmorphic disorder, transvestic disorder
- Treatment: Transitioning, gender-affirming care, psychotherapy
- Medication: Hormones (e.g., androgens, antiandrogens, estrogens)

Gender dysphoria is distress arising from the mismatch between one's gender identity and aspects of one's body, social role, and lived experience that are tied to one's assigned sex. The term replaced gender identity disorder (GID) in 2013 with the release of the DSM-5 to remove the stigma associated with the term disorder. The ICD-11, which does not consider it a mental disorder, uses the term gender incongruence (GI) instead, defined as a marked and persistent mismatch between gender identity and assigned sex, regardless of distress or impairment.

Not all transgender people have gender dysphoria. Gender nonconformity is not the same thing as gender dysphoria and does not always lead to dysphoria or distress. Before puberty, the diagnoses are gender dysphoria in childhood and gender incongruence of childhood. The causes of gender incongruence are unknown but a gender identity likely reflects genetic, biological, environmental, and cultural factors.

Diagnosis can be given at any age, although gender dysphoria in children and adolescents may manifest differently than in adults. Complications may include anxiety, depression, and eating disorders. Treatment includes social transitioning and often includes hormone replacement therapy (HRT) or gender-affirming surgery, and psychotherapy.

Some researchers and transgender people argue for the declassification of the condition because they say the diagnosis pathologizes gender variance and reinforces the binary model of gender. However, this declassification could carry implications for healthcare accessibility, as HRT and gender-affirming surgery could be deemed cosmetic by insurance providers, as opposed to medically necessary treatment, thereby affecting coverage.

== Signs and symptoms ==
In the DSM-5, a marked incongruence between a person's felt gender and assigned sex or gender (usually at birth) is the core component of the diagnosis, which requires distress about the incongruence. In pre-pubertal youth it may manifest as an insistence that they are, or will grow up to be, another gender than the one assigned at birth, an aversion to their assigned gender, or an insistence they have or desire to have different genitalia. They may express aversions to stereotypically gendered activities and desire opposite sex-typical toys, games, activities, or playmates though this may be less prominent in surroundings with fewer stereotypes.

The DSM-5 states that gender dysphoria tends to be early-onset (starting prior to puberty) or late-onset (starting during or after puberty) in non-intersex individuals. Those with early-onset GD which continues into adolescence mostly identify as heterosexual, being attracted to their assigned gender at birth. In some cases, the GD desists or is denied, during which the youth may identify as lesbian or gay, though some may experience a later resurgence in GD. Some of those with late-onset GD report desire to transition during childhood that was not verbalized and others have no recollections of childhood gender dysphoria. According to the American Psychiatric Association, those who experience gender dysphoria later in life "often report having secretly hidden their gender dysphoric feelings from others when they were younger". No particular sexual orientation indicates gender dysphoria. A 2021 review in Dialogues in Clinical Neuroscience found no relation to sexual orientation, but acknowledged that historically the two were often erroneously conflated. The British National Health Service also stated "gender dysphoria is not related to sexual orientation".

== Causes ==
In a 2020 position statement, the Endocrine Society stated that in the late 20th century, transgender and gender incongruent people were thought to suffer a mental health disorder and gender identity was considered malleable and subject to external influences. However, this was no longer considered valid as "considerable scientific evidence has emerged demonstrating a durable biological element underlying gender identity. Individuals may make choices due to other factors in their lives, but there do not seem to be external forces that genuinely cause individuals to change gender identity".

The cited evidence includes that attempts to change the gender identity of intersex patients to match their genitalia or chromosomes are generally unsuccessful, that there is evidence that higher levels of exposure to androgens in utero causes higher rates of male gender identity among those with female chromosomes, that those with complete androgen insensitivity syndrome among those with male chromosomes typically have a female gender identity, that identical twins are more likely to both be transgender than non-identical twins, and that brain scans have shown associations with gender identity rather than genitalia or chromosomes.

Their 2017 clinical practice guidelines stated "Results of studies from a variety of biomedical disciplines—genetic, endocrine, and neuroanatomic—support the concept that gender identity and/or gender expression likely reflect a complex interplay of biological, environmental, and cultural factors" and noted research pointing to unique brain phenotype associated with gender dysphoria and gender incongruence, heritability of the conditions, the role of pre- and post-natal androgens in gender development, and gender identities among intersex people.

== Diagnosis ==
=== DSM-5 ===
Puberty of a male and of a female. The manifestation of sexual dimorphism in adolescence.

The American Psychiatric Association permits a diagnosis of gender dysphoria in adolescents or adults if two or more of the following criteria are experienced for at least six months' duration:

- A significant incongruence between one's experienced or expressed gender and one's sexual characteristics
- A strong desire to be rid of one's sexual characteristics due to incongruence with one's experienced or expressed gender
- A strong desire for the sexual characteristics of a gender other than one's assigned gender
- A strong desire to be of a gender other than one's assigned gender
- A strong desire to be treated as a gender other than one's assigned gender
- A strong conviction that one has the typical reactions and feelings of a gender other than one's assigned gender

In addition, the condition must be associated with clinically significant distress or impairment.

The diagnosis also contains two specifiers:

- "With a disorder/difference of sex development" should be used for those with intersex conditions, in which case the condition should be coded.
- "Posttransition" may be used if the patient "has transitioned to full-time living in the experienced gender (with or without legalization of gender change)" and has or will undergo "at least one gender-affirming medical procedure or treatment regimen—namely, regular gender-affirming hormone treatment or gender reassignment surgery".

The DSM-5 stated that "Gender dysphoria as a general descriptive term refers to the distress that may accompany the incongruence between one's experienced or expressed gender and one's assigned gender. However, it is more specifically defined when used as a diagnostic category. It does not refer to distress related to stigma, a distinct although possibly co-occurring source of distress."

Neither the DSM-I (1952) nor the DSM-II (1968) contained a diagnosis analogous to gender dysphoria. Gender identity disorder first appeared as a diagnosis in the DSM-III (1980), where it appeared under "psychosexual disorders" but was used only for the childhood diagnosis. Adolescents and adults received a diagnosis of transsexualism (homosexual, heterosexual, or asexual type). The DSM-III-R (1987) added "Gender Identity Disorder of Adolescence and Adulthood, Non-Transsexual Type" (GIDAANT). The DSM-5 moved this diagnosis out of the sexual disorders category and into a category of its own. The diagnosis was renamed from gender identity disorder to gender dysphoria, after criticisms that the former term was stigmatizing. Subtyping by sexual orientation was deleted. The diagnosis for children was separated from that for adults, as "gender dysphoria in children". The creation of a specific diagnosis for children reflects the lesser ability of children to have insight into what they are experiencing, or ability to express it if they have insight. Other specified gender dysphoria or unspecified gender dysphoria can be diagnosed if a person does not meet the criteria for gender dysphoria but still has clinically significant distress or impairment. Intersex people are no longer excluded from the diagnosis of GD.

=== ICD-11 ===
The International Classification of Diseases (ICD-11) lists three conditions related to gender identity:

- Gender incongruence of adolescence or adulthood (HA60)
- Gender incongruence of childhood (HA61)
- Gender incongruence, unspecified (HA6Z)

ICD-11 defines gender incongruence as "a marked and persistent incongruence between an individual's experienced gender and the assigned sex", with no requirement for significant distress or impairment, and a note that "gender variant behaviour and preferences alone are not a basis for assigning the diagnosis.

The ICD-10 contained the diagnoses "transsexualism" and "gender identity disorder of children" under the "Mental and behavioral disorders" chapter. The ICD-11 renamed the conditions "gender incongruence of adolescence" or adulthood and "gender incongruence of childhood" and moved them into the chapter "Conditions related to sexual health" to reflect "current knowledge that trans-related and gender diverse identities are not conditions of mental ill-health, and that classifying them as such can cause enormous stigma". The World Health Organization said, however, that they kept a diagnosis in the ICD-11 to "ensure transgender people's [continued] access to gender-affirming health care" and health insurance.

== Co-occurring conditions ==
Several psychiatric and neurodevelopmental conditions have been observed to disproportionately co-occur with gender dysphoria. Comorbidity with psychiatric diagnoses has been found in 62.7% of individuals with GD. Major depressive disorder, mood disorders, anxiety, and substance abuse are all seen in disproportionate levels in people with GD compared to adults without it.

Gender dysphoria's frequent co-occurrence with psychiatric and psychological disorders is seen within youth populations in addition to adult populations. Among youth, around 20% to 30% of individuals attending gender clinics meet the DSM criteria for an anxiety disorder. Gender dysphoria is also associated with an increased risk of eating disorders in transgender youth. In addition, children and adolescents with gender dysphoria are also more likely to have ADHD, depression, and histories of suicidality, self-harm, and adverse childhood experiences.

A widely held view among clinicians is that there is an over-representation of neurodevelopmental conditions amongst individuals with GD, although this view has been questioned due to the low quality of evidence. Studies on children and adolescents with gender dysphoria have found a high prevalence of autistic traits or a confirmed diagnosis of autism. Adults with gender dysphoria attending specialist gender clinics have also been shown to have high rates of autistic traits or an autism diagnosis as well. It has been estimated that autistic children were over four times as likely to be diagnosed with GD, with autism being reported from 6% to over 20% of teens referring to gender identity services.

Autistic people are more likely to be gender diverse and in those with gender dysphoria there is an overrepresentation of autistic traits. In prepubertal youth, increasing age is associated with more behavioral and emotional problems due to increasing nonacceptance of gender nonconforming behaviors than others, while children and adolescents in affirming environments show less or no psychological problems. Younger children are also less likely to express extreme and persistent dysphoria about their anatomy.

== Treatment ==
The Endocrine Society's 2016 clinical practice guideline Endocrine Treatment of Gender-Dysphoric/Gender-Incongruent Persons notes that gender-affirmation is a multidisciplinary treatment and those with gender dysphoria or incongruence seek or are referred to endocrinologists to develop physical characteristics of the affirmed gender. The hormone regimen aims to suppress endogenous sex hormones and maintain normal sex hormone levels of the affirmed gender. Hormone treatment is not recommended for pre-pubertal youth. Adolescents with gender dysphoria and incongruence are recommended puberty blockers at Tanner Stage 2, when puberty is beginning. Gender-affirming hormones are prescribed after a multidisciplinary team has confirmed the persistence of the dysphoria or incoungrence and capacity for informed consent, which is normally developed by 16 years old.

WPATH produced the 8th edition of its Standards of Care for the Health of Transgender and Gender Diverse People in 2022 stated "However, gender incongruence that causes clinically significant distress and impairment often requires medically necessary clinical interventions" such as endocrine and surgical procedures. Other gender-affirming interventions may include hair removal/transplants, voice therapy/surgery, counseling, and other medical procedures.

The AWMF released guidelines in 2025 which found there is "no proven effective treatment alternative without body-modifying medical measures for a [person with] permanently persistent gender incongruence."

Treatment for a person diagnosed with GD may include psychological counseling, supporting the individual's gender expression (such as through the clothes they wear), or may involve physical transition resulting from medical interventions such as hormonal treatment, genital surgery, electrolysis, laser hair removal, chest surgery, breast surgery or other reconstructive surgeries.

Historically, gender identity change efforts (conversion therapy targeting gender identity) were seen as a treatment option for those with gender dysphoria or incongruence, particularly youth. The view that "transsexualism" and gender dysphoria were psychological conditions which should only be treated with psychotherapy was the dominant view until the 1970s, though some clinicians continued to hold it afterwards. Attempts to alleviate GD by changing the patient's gender identity to reflect assigned sex have been ineffective and are regarded as conversion therapy by most health organizations. The AWMF guidelines state "psychotherapy is recommended for co-incident disorders, for which there is already an indication due to the co-incident disorder itself" but criticized the recommendation of psychotherapy for "management of [GD] associated distress" noting that "none of the studies included in the review in question were able to show a reduction in gender dysphoria through psychotherapy."

=== Children ===
Medical, scientific, and governmental organizations have opposed conversion therapy, defined as treatment viewing gender nonconformity as pathological and something to be changed, instead supporting approaches that affirm children's diverse gender identities. People are more likely to keep having gender dysphoria the more intense their gender dysphoria, cross-gendered behavior, and verbal identification with the desired/experienced gender are (i.e. stating that they are a different gender rather than wish to be a different gender).

Professionals who treat gender dysphoria in children sometimes prescribe puberty blockers to delay the onset of puberty until a child is believed to be old enough to make an informed decision on whether hormonal or surgical gender reassignment is in their best interest. Short-term side effects of puberty blockers include headaches, fatigue, insomnia, muscle aches and changes in breast tissue, mood, and weight. Research on the long-term effects on brain development, cognitive function, fertility, and sexual function is limited.

A review published in Child and Adolescent Mental Health found that puberty blockers are reversible, and that they are associated with positive outcomes such as decreased suicidality in adulthood, improved affect and psychological functioning, and improved social life. A later review from 2025, published in Frontiers in Endocrinology, found that puberty blockers "significantly improve" mental health, albeit long-term physical safety outcomes remain uncertain.

According to the American Psychiatric Association, "Due to the dynamic nature of puberty development, lack of gender-affirming interventions (i.e. social, psychological, and medical) is not a neutral decision; youth often experience worsening dysphoria and negative impact on mental health as the incongruent and unwanted puberty progresses. Trans-affirming treatment, such as the use of puberty suppression, is associated with the relief of emotional distress, and notable gains in psychosocial and emotional development, in trans and gender diverse youth".

In its position statement published December 2020, the Endocrine Society stated that there is durable evidence for a biological underpinning to gender identity and that pubertal suppression, hormone therapy, and medically indicated surgery are effective and relatively safe when monitored appropriately and have been established as the standard of care. They noted a decrease in suicidal ideation among youth who have access to gender-affirming care and comparable levels of depression to cisgender peers among socially transitioned pre-pubertal youth. In its 2017 guideline on treating those with gender dysphoria, it recommends puberty blockers be started when the child has started puberty (Tanner Stage 2 for breast or genital development) and cross-sex hormones be started at 16, though they note "there may be compelling reasons to initiate sex hormone treatment prior to the age of 16 years in some adolescents with GD/gender incongruence". They recommend a multidisciplinary team of medical and mental health professionals manage the treatment for those under 18 and recommend "monitoring clinical pubertal development every 3 to 6 months and laboratory parameters every 6 to 12 months during sex hormone treatment".

The World Professional Association for Transgender Health's Standards of Care 8, published in 2022, declare puberty blocking medication as "medically necessary", and recommends them for usage in transgender adolescents once the patient has reached Tanner stage 2 of development, and state that longitudinal data shows improved outcomes for transgender patients who receive them. Some medical professionals disagree that adolescents are cognitively mature enough to make a decision with regard to hormone therapy or surgery, and advise that irreversible genital procedures should not be performed on individuals under the age of legal consent in their respective country.

A review commissioned by the UK Department of Health found that there was very low certainty of quality of evidence about puberty blocker outcomes in terms of mental health, quality of life and impact on gender dysphoria. The Finnish government commissioned a review of the research evidence for treatment of minors and the Finnish Ministry of Health concluded that there are no research-based health care methods for minors with gender dysphoria. Nevertheless, they recommend the use of puberty blockers for minors on a case-by-case basis, and the American Academy of Pediatrics state that "pubertal suppression in children who identify as TGD [transgender and gender diverse] generally leads to improved psychological functioning in adolescence and young adulthood."

In the United States, several states have introduced or are considering legislation that would prohibit the use of puberty blockers in the treatment of transgender children. The American Medical Association, the Endocrine Society, the American Psychological Association, the American Academy of Child and Adolescent Psychiatry and the American Academy of Pediatrics oppose bans on puberty blockers for transgender children. In the UK, in the case of Bell v Tavistock, an appeal court, overturning the original decision, ruled that children under 16 could give consent to receiving puberty blockers. In 2022, the National Board of Health and Welfare in Sweden issued new guidelines recommending that puberty blockers only be given in "exceptional cases" and said that their use was grounded in "uncertain science". Instead, they recommended child psychiatric treatment, psychosocial interventions, and suicide prevention measures to be offered by clinicians.

=== Biological treatments ===
Biological treatments physically alter primary and secondary sex characteristics to reduce the discrepancy between an individual's physical body and gender identity. Biological treatments for GD are typically undertaken in conjunction with psychotherapy; however, the WPATH Standards of Care state that psychotherapy should not be an absolute requirement for biological treatments.

Hormonal treatments have been shown to reduce a number of symptoms of psychiatric distress associated with gender dysphoria. A WPATH commissioned systematic review of the outcomes of hormone therapy "found evidence that gender-affirming hormone therapy may be associated with improvements in [quality of life] scores and decreases in depression and anxiety symptoms among transgender people." The strength of the evidence was low due to methodological limitations of the studies undertaken. Some literature suggests that gender-affirming surgery is associated with improvements in quality of life and decreased incidence of depression. Those who choose to undergo gender-affirming surgery report high satisfaction rates with the outcome, though these studies have limitations including risk of bias (lack of randomization, lack of controlled studies, self-reported outcomes) and high loss to follow up.

Disagreement among practitioners regarding treatment of adolescents is in part due to the lack of long-term data. Young people qualifying for biomedical treatment according to the Dutch model (including having GD from early childhood which intensifies at puberty and absence of co-occurring psychiatric conditions that could challenge diagnosis or treatment) found reduction in gender dysphoria, although limitations to these outcome studies have been noted, such as lack of controls or considering alternatives like psychotherapy.

In its position statement published December 2020, the Endocrine Society stated that there is durable evidence for a biological underpinning to gender identity and that pubertal suppression, hormone therapy, and medically indicated surgery are effective and relatively safe when monitored appropriately and have been established as the standard of care. They noted a decrease in suicidal ideation among youth who have access to gender-affirming care and comparable levels of depression to cisgender peers among socially transitioned pre-pubertal youth.

A review published in Child and Adolescent Mental Health found that puberty blockers are fully reversible, and that they are associated with such positive outcomes as decreased suicidality in adulthood, improved affect and psychological functioning, and improved social life. A later review from 2025, published in Frontiers in Endocrinology, found that puberty blockers "significantly improve" mental health, albeit long-term physical safety outcomes remain uncertain.

More rigorous studies are needed to assess the effectiveness, safety, and long-term benefits and risks of hormonal and surgical treatments. For instance, a 2020 Cochrane review found insufficient evidence to determine whether feminizing hormones were safe or effective, due to the lack of "completed studies that met [their] inclusion criteria." Several studies have found significant long-term psychological and psychiatric pathology after surgical treatments.

In 2021, a review published in Plastic and Reconstructive Surgery found that about 1% (95% CI <1%–2%) of people who undergo gender-affirming surgery regret the decision. It concluded that "There is an extremely low prevalence of regret in transgender patients after GAS. We believe this study corroborates the improvements made in regard to selection criteria for GAS. However, there is high subjectivity in the assessment of regret and lack of standardized questionnaires, which highlight the importance of developing validated questionnaires in this population."

== Epidemiology ==
Different studies have arrived at different conclusions about the prevalence of gender dysphoria. The DSM-5 gives a gender dysphoria prevalence of 0.005% to 0.014% of people assigned male at birth (5-14 per 100k) and 0.002% to 0.003% of people assigned female at birth (2-3 per 100k). The DSM-5 states that these numbers are likely underestimates, being based on the number of referrals to specialty clinics. Not all adults seeking medical transition are referred to specialty clinics.

According to Black's Medical Dictionary, gender dysphoria "occurs in one in 30,000 male births and one in 100,000 female births." Studies in European countries in the early 2000s found that about 1 in 12,000 natal male adults (8 per 100k) and 1 in 30,000 (3 per 100k) natal female adults seek out gender-affirming surgery. Studies of hormonal treatment or legal name change find higher prevalence than sex reassignment, with, for example a 2010 Swedish study finding that 1 in 7,750 (13 per 100k) adult natal males and 1 in 13,120 (8 per 100k) adult natal females requested a legal name change to a name of the opposite gender.

Studies that measure transgender status by self-identification find even greater prevalence of gender identity different from sex assigned at birth (although some of those who identify as transgender or gender nonconforming may not experience clinically significant distress and so do not have gender dysphoria). A study in New Zealand found that 1 in 3,630 natal males (13 per 100k) and 1 in 22,714 (4 per 100k) natal females have changed their legal gender markers. A survey of Massachusetts adults found that 0.5% (500 per 100k) identify as transgender. A national survey in New Zealand of 8,500 randomly selected secondary school students from 91 randomly selected high schools found 1.2% (1,200 per 100k) of students responded "yes" to the question "Do you think you are transgender?". Outside of a clinical setting, the stability of transgender or non-binary identities is unknown.

Research indicates that among people who transition in adulthood, individuals are up to three times more likely to be male assigned at birth. However, among people transitioning in childhood, the sex ratio is closer to 1:1. The prevalence of gender dysphoria in children remains uncertain due to the lack of formal prevalence studies. A 2022 literature review reported that approximately 36% of adolescents assessed in specialized gender clinics were natal males, and 63% were natal females. One study highlighted in the review found no significant change in these proportions from 2014 to 2016. However, when comparing more recent data with earlier studies, there has been a shift favoring natal females (ratio of 1:3) as opposed to nearly equal proportions in earlier studies (ratios of 0.8–0.9:1).

== Society and culture ==
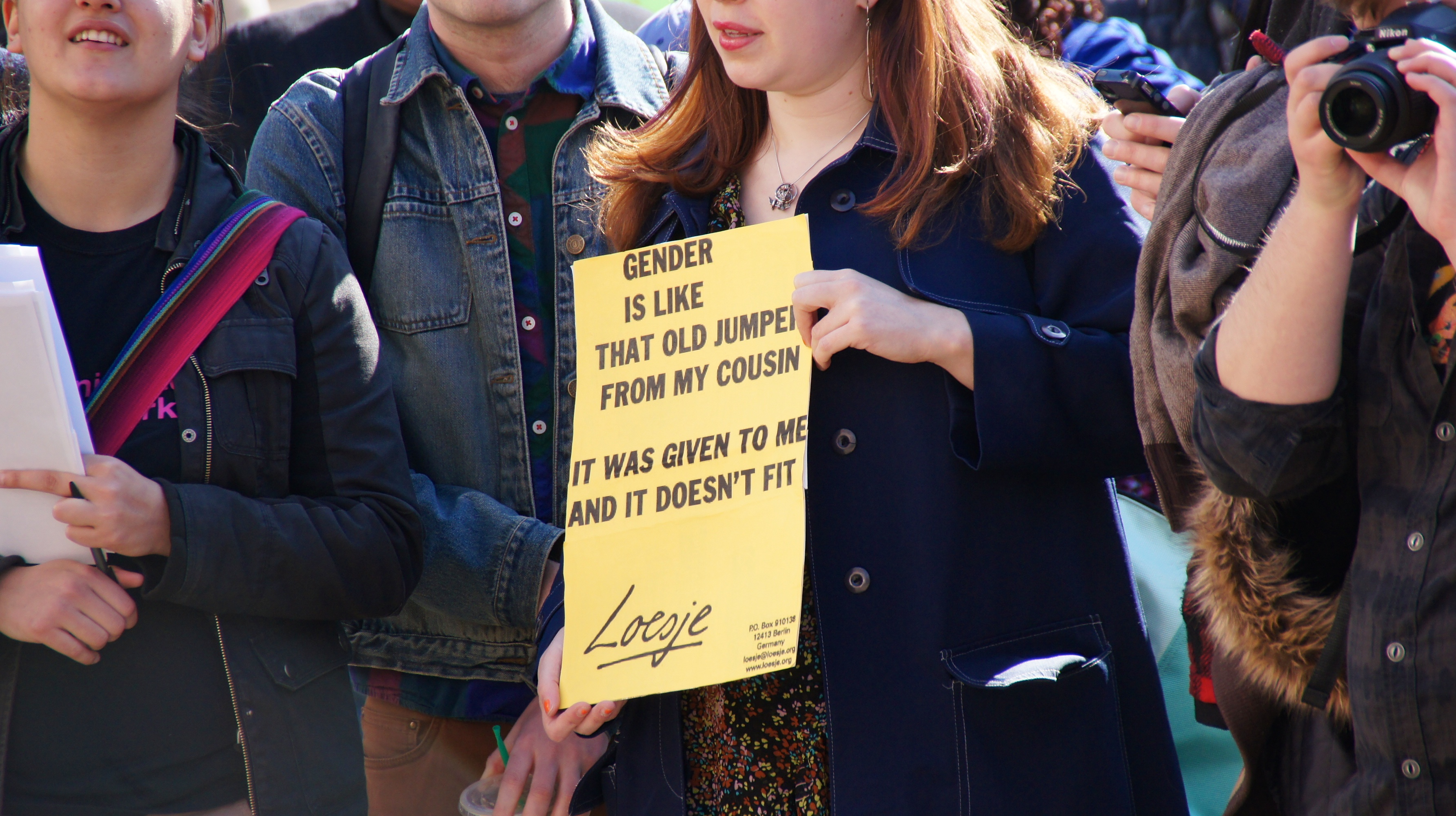
A sign at a trans rights rally: "Gender is like that old jumper from my cousin: It was given to me and it doesn't fit."

Researchers disagree about the nature of distress and impairment in people with GD. Some authors have suggested that people with GD suffer because they are stigmatized and victimized; and that, if society had less strict gender divisions, transgender people would suffer less.

Some controversy surrounds the creation of the GD diagnosis, with Davy et al. stating that although the creators of the diagnosis state that it has rigorous scientific support, "it is impossible to scrutinize such claims, since the discussions, methodological processes, and promised field trials of the diagnosis have not been published."

Some cultures have three or more defined genders. The existence of accepted social categories other than man or woman may alleviate the distress associated with cross-gender identity. For example, in Samoa, the fa'afafine, a group of feminine males, are mostly socially accepted. The fa'afafine appear similar to transgender women in terms of their lifelong identities and gendered behavior, but experience far less distress than do transgender women in Western cultures. This suggests that the distress of gender dysphoria is significantly increased by difficulties encountered from social disapproval by one's culture. Overall, it is unclear whether or not gender dysphoria persists in cultures with third gender categories.

=== Classification as a disorder ===
The psychiatric diagnosis of gender identity disorder (now gender dysphoria) was introduced in DSM-III in 1980. Arlene Istar Lev and Deborah Rudacille have characterized the addition as a political maneuver to re-stigmatize homosexuality. (Homosexuality was declassified as a mental disorder in the DSM-II in 1974.) By contrast, Kenneth Zucker and Robert Spitzer argue that gender identity disorder was included in DSM-III because it "met the generally accepted criteria used by the framers of DSM-III for inclusion." Some researchers, including Spitzer and Paul J. Fink, contend that the behaviors and experiences seen in transsexualism are abnormal and constitute a dysfunction. The American Psychiatric Association stated that gender nonconformity is not the same thing as gender dysphoria, and that "gender nonconformity is not in itself a mental disorder. The critical element of gender dysphoria is the presence of clinically significant distress associated with the condition."

Individuals with gender dysphoria may or may not regard their own cross-gender feelings and behaviors as a disorder. Advantages and disadvantages exist to classifying gender dysphoria as a disorder. Because gender dysphoria had been classified as a disorder in medical texts (such as the previous DSM manual, the DSM-IV-TR, under the name "gender identity disorder"), many insurance companies are willing to cover some of the expenses of sex reassignment therapy. Without the classification of gender dysphoria as a medical disorder, sex reassignment therapy may be viewed as a cosmetic treatment, rather than medically necessary treatment, and may not be covered. In the United States, transgender people are less likely than others to have health insurance, and often face hostility and insensitivity from healthcare providers. The Americans with Disabilities Act covers individuals with gender dysphoria. In October 2026, the U.S. Department of Health and Human Services issued a final rule (effective in January 2027) that excludes gender dysphoria from the definition of disability in its Section 504 implementation regulations unless the gender dysphoria results from a physical impairment. Some researchers and transgender people support declassification of the condition because they say the diagnosis pathologizes gender variance and reinforces the binary model of gender.

An analysis of the Samoan third gender fa'afafine suggests that the DSM-IV-TR diagnostic component of distress is not inherent in the cross-gender identity; rather, it is related to social rejection and discrimination suffered by the individual. Psychology professor Darryl Hill insists that gender dysphoria is not a mental disorder, but rather that the diagnostic criteria reflect psychological distress in children that occurs when parents and others have trouble relating to their child's gender variance. Transgender people have often been harassed, socially excluded, and subjected to discrimination, abuse and violence, including murder.

In December 2002, the British Lord Chancellor's office published a Government Policy Concerning Transsexual People document that categorically states, "What transsexualism is not ... It is not a mental illness." In May 2009, the government of France declared that a transsexual gender identity will no longer be classified as a psychiatric condition, but according to French trans rights organizations, beyond the impact of the announcement itself, nothing changed. Denmark made a similar statement in 2016.

In the ICD-11, GID is reclassified as "gender incongruence", a condition related to sexual health. The working group responsible for this recategorization recommended keeping such a diagnosis in ICD-11 to preserve access to health services.

== Gender euphoria ==
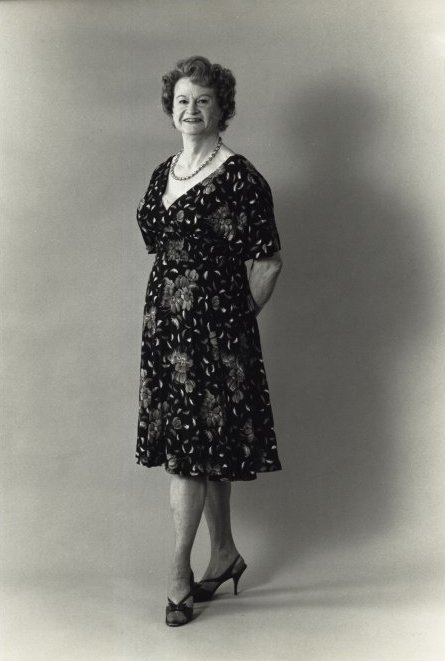
In 1990, Virginia Prince ended an article wishing her readers "gender euphoria".

Gender euphoria (GE) is a term for the satisfaction, enjoyment, or relief felt by people when they feel their gender expression matches their personal gender identity. Psych Central's definition is "deep joy when your internal gender identity matches your gender expression." It is proposed that feelings of gender euphoria require societal acceptance of gender expression. In academics and the medical field, a consensus has not yet been reached on a precise definition of the term, as it has been mainly used within a social context. The first attempt to rigorously define gender euphoria through an online survey took place in 2021, conducted by Will Beischel, Stéphanie Gauvin, and Sari van Anders. Transgender congruence is also used to ascribe transgender individuals feeling genuine, authentic, and comfortable with their gender identity and external appearance.

The term gender euphoria has been used by the transgender community since at least the mid-1970s. Originally, it referred to the feeling of joy arising from fulfilling a mix of gender roles, which was different from the concept of gender dysphoria, which is used to describe individuals who wished to medically transition to a different sex. In the 1980s, the term was published in trans contexts, coming up in interviews with trans people. For example, in a 1988 interview with a trans man, the subject states, "I think that day [Dr. Charles Ilhenfeld] administered my first shot of the 'wonder-drug' must have been one of the 'peak-experiences' of my life -- talk about 'gender euphoria'!" The interview indicates he is referring to testosterone.

Other figures, including Mariette Pathy Allen and Virginia Prince, have used the term in their work. In 1990, Virginia Prince used the phrase in the trans magazine Femme Mirror, ending an article with, "...from here on you can enjoy GENDER EUPHORIA - HAVE A GOOD LIFE!" Starting in 1991, a monthly newsletter named Gender Euphoria was released, featuring articles about transgender topics; Leslie Feinberg read the newsletter to better understand the transgender community. However, there are instances in which gender euphoria has been used with a different meaning, such as in 1979, when the Black feminist Michele Wallace used it to describe the male privilege present in Black men.

The term has been embraced as part of a movement to stop pathologizing being transgender. In 1989, Mariette Pathy Allen published an unnamed transgender person's quote in her photography book Transformations: "The shrinks may call it 'gender dysphoria,' but for some of us, it's gender 'euphoria,' and we're not going to apologize anymore!" The movement to focus on the positive side of gender expression was also advocated for in 1994, when the Scottish "TV/TS" periodical The Tartan Skirt wrote, "Let's accentuate the positive, discard the negative, and promote the new condition of 'Gender Euphoria.'" In 1997, Patrick Califia described transgender activists picketing using signs that read "Gender Euphoria NOT Gender Dysphoria" and handing out "thousands of leaflets" at protests. The following year, in 1998, Second Skins: The Body Narratives of Transsexuality reported:

The transactivist group Transexual Menace is campaigning to have the diagnosis "Gender Identity Disorder" removed entirely from the Diagnostic and Statistical Manual of Mental Disorders. "Gender Euphoria NOT Gender Dysphoria"; its slogans invert the pathologizing of transgender, offering pride in queer difference as an alternative to the psychiatric story.

Similarly, Florence Ashley has advocated for the medical field to focus on helping patients achieve gender euphoria instead of treating patients on the basis of gender dysphoria. They argue that currently, in order for individuals to receive gender-affirming care, they must be diagnosed with gender dysphoria, which is not always accessible and entails people must be experiencing significant distress before they can fully express their own gender identity. Ashley's stance that gender euphoria does not need to be preceded by a clinical diagnosis of gender dysphoria, and that gender euphoria is complex, is echoed by Elliot Tebbe and Stephanie Budge in their 2022 Nature Reviews Psychology article, in which they write, "Gender euphoria is not merely the absence of gender dysphoria, but rather a conglomeration of positive emotions and subjective well-being in response to being affirmed in one's gender."

Gender euphoria has also been expressed through art. Photography in the East Village in Manhattan has served as means to express gender euphoria, contrasting fashion photography, which is said to reinforce the gender binary.

In 2019, the Midsumma festival in Australia hosted "Gender Euphoria", a cabaret focusing on "bliss" in transgender experiences, including musical, ballet, and burlesque performances. A reviewer described it as "triumphant – honest, unpretentious, touching, and a vital celebration".

The 2020 young adult fantasy novel Euphoria Kids by Alison Evans was also inspired by the concept of gender euphoria. In the book's foreword, Evans wrote: "I want people to learn about gender euphoria (before) gender dysphoria... I want the young trans kids that will read this book to be proud of who they are, and to imagine wonderful, magic lives for themselves."

== See also ==
- Voice dysphoria - subtype of gender dysphoria
- List of transgender-related topics
- Gender transitioning
- Detransition
- ICD-11 § Gender incongruence
- Transmedicalism
- Wrong-body narrative
