= Nancy C. Maryboy =

Cherokee and Navajo astronomer and educator

- Awards: Lifetime Achievement Award from the Association of Tribal Archives, Libraries, & Museums

Academic background
- Education: California Institute of Integral Studies
- Thesis: Nanitá̕ Są̕ąh Naagha̕í Nanitá̕ Bike̕h Hózhóón

Academic work
- Discipline: astronomy Indigenous science
- Institutions: Indigenous Education Institute; Northern Arizona University; Shonto Preparatory School
- Main interests: Indigenous astronomy
- Notable works: Sharing the skies: Navajo astronomy

Nancy Cottrell Maryboy is a Cherokee and Navajo educator and Indigenous science expert. Maryboy is the president of the Indigenous Education Institute, an organization she founded in 1995 to apply traditional Indigenous knowledge to contemporary settings. Much of her work has focused on Indigenous astronomy and she has written several books on Navajo astronomy.

== Background and education ==
Nancy Maryboy is Cherokee and Navajo (Diné), from the Cherokee Bird Clan, the Navajo Deer Springs Clan, and the Navajo Cliff Dweller Clan. Her family includes traditional and medical healers. Maryboy's name in Cherokee is Tsawayuga, meaning "bird." She lived on the Navajo Nation for twenty-five years.

Maryboy received her Ph.D. in Indigenous Science in 1998 from the California Institute of Integral Studies. Her Ph.D. thesis, cowritten with David Begay, was titled Nanitá̕ Są̕ąh Naagha̕í Nanitá̕ Bike̕h Hózhóón (Living the order: dynamic cosmic process of Diné cosmology).

== Career ==
Maryboy has held a position as adjunct professor in the Department of Physics and Astronomy at Northern Arizona University and has developed courses on Indigenous philosophy in curriculum for the University of Alaska, Fairbanks. She was a faculty member and administrator at Diné College for thirteen years. She was the Director of Curriculum and Professional Development for Shonto Preparatory School, a K-12 school system on the Navajo Nation for three years.

She has served as the principal investigator for several National Science Foundation (NSF)-funded projects. One of those projects was "Cosmic Serpent - Bridging Native and Western Science Learning in Informal Settings," a four-year effort providing collaboration opportunities between Indigenous communities and science education professionals; the project won a $550,000 grant from the NSF. The project provided professional development workshops for museum educators, a 2011 conference jointly hosted by the National Museum of the American Indian and the Association of Science and Technology Centers, an informational website, and a culminating book.

She was also the principal investigator on another NSF-funded project, "Native Universe: Indigenous Voice in Science Museums," which promoted the inclusion of Indigenous perspectives in science museums. That project was awarded over one million dollars from the NSF and included building partnerships between organizations such as the ʻImiloa Astronomy Center, the Oregon Museum of Science and Industry, the Arizona-Sonora Desert Museum, the Durango Discovery Museum, and the National Museum of the American Indian. She is also the co-principal investigator for a NASA-funded project, "The Navajo Sky: Education Modules for Digital Planetariums," a four-year project developing educational digital planetarium modules that feature Navajo sky stories and juxtapose Navajo and Western astronomy. Maryboy lectures about Indigenous astronomy, discussing similarities and differences from Western astronomy and sharing the foundational stories of Navajo star knowledge. She has collaborated with NASA's Goddard Space Flight Center and Jet Propulsion Laboratory on several projects, including a planetarium show titled "See the Skies Through Navajo Eyes."

In 1995, Maryboy founded the Indigenous Education Institute, a nonprofit organization working to preserve traditional Indigenous knowledge and apply it to areas such as astronomy and other science disciplines. She is a core member of the Native American Academy, an organization promoting the value of Native knowledge. She is also the president of Wohali Productions, a consulting agency for Indigenous science communication.

In 2016 she was honored with a Lifetime Achievement Award from the Association of Tribal Archives, Libraries, & Museums.

== Selected publications ==
- Stars over Diné bikéyah: winter stories of the Navajo constellations / Nancy C. Maryboy (Boulder, Colorado: World Hope Foundation, 2005) ISBN 9781419622663
- Sharing the skies: Navajo astronomy / Nancy C. Maryboy and David H. Begay (Tucscon, Arizona: Rio Nuevo Publishers, 2010). ISBN 9781933855400
- The cosmic serpent: bridging Native ways of knowing and western science in museum settings / Nancy C. Maryboy, David Begay, Laura Piticolas (Indigenous Education Institute, 2012). ISBN 9780985988708
