= Victorian Premier's Literary Awards Prize for Best Music Theatre Script =

The Prize for Best Music Theatre Script was a prize category in the annual Victorian Premier's Literary Awards. The $15,000 prize was only awarded in 2008 and 2009. Music theatre works are currently eligible for the Victorian Premier's Prize for Drama.

- 2008 winner: The Wild Blue - music, lyrics and book by Anthony Crowley
  - shortlisted: The Hanging of Jean Lee - libretto by Jordie Albiston and Abe Pogos, composed by Andrèe Greenwell; Crossing Live - words by Matthew Saville, music by Briony Marks
- 2009 winner: Shane Warne The Musical by Eddie Perfect
  - shortlisted: Metro Street by Matthew Robinson; Poor Boy by Matt Cameron and Tim Finn
