= The Pause =

The Pause may refer to:

- The Pause (story), 1954 science fiction short story by Isaac Asimov
- The Pause (novel), 2015 novel by John Larkin

== See also ==
- Pause (disambiguation)
