= Pause =

Pause may refer to:

== Technology ==
- Stop playing audio or video, with the possibility to continue (in the case of video: with a still image)
- The Pause key or symbol (⏸)
  - Found on media players (software, digital, portable), remote controls, cassette decks, VCRs and optical disc players (CD, DVD, Blu-ray)

=== Computing ===
- Pause key, the Pause/Break key on computer keyboards
- pause, a DOS command
- The Perl Authors Upload Server (PAUSE), an interface for uploading Perl modules to the Comprehensive Perl Archive Network

=== Video games ===
- Pause (video gaming), the option to temporarily suspend play of a video game (first seen in Yar's Revenge 1982)

== Arts and entertainment ==
=== Film and television ===
- Pause (2014 film), a 2014 Swiss film
- Pause (2018 film), a Cypriot film
- "Pause" (The Boondocks), a 2010 episode from the third season of The Boondocks

=== Music ===
- Rest (music), a musical pause
- Fermata, a musical pause of indefinite duration
- Pause (band), a Thai rock band
- Pause (musician), American musician and rap artist
- Pause (Four Tet album), 2001
- Pause (P-Model album), 1994
- "Pause" (Run–D.M.C. song), 1990
- "Pause" (Jay Dee song), 2001
- "Pause" (Pitbull song), 2011
- "(Pause)", a 2023 song by the Lottery Winners from Anxiety Replacement Therapy

== Other uses ==
- Pause (slang), in hip hop culture, a synonym of "no homo"
- Pause, in linguistics, is a form of interruption to articulatory continuity
- Pausa, in linguistics, is a hiatus between prosodic units

== See also ==
- The Pause (disambiguation)
- Hesitation (disambiguation)
