= Jordie Albiston =

Australian poet and academic (1961–2022)

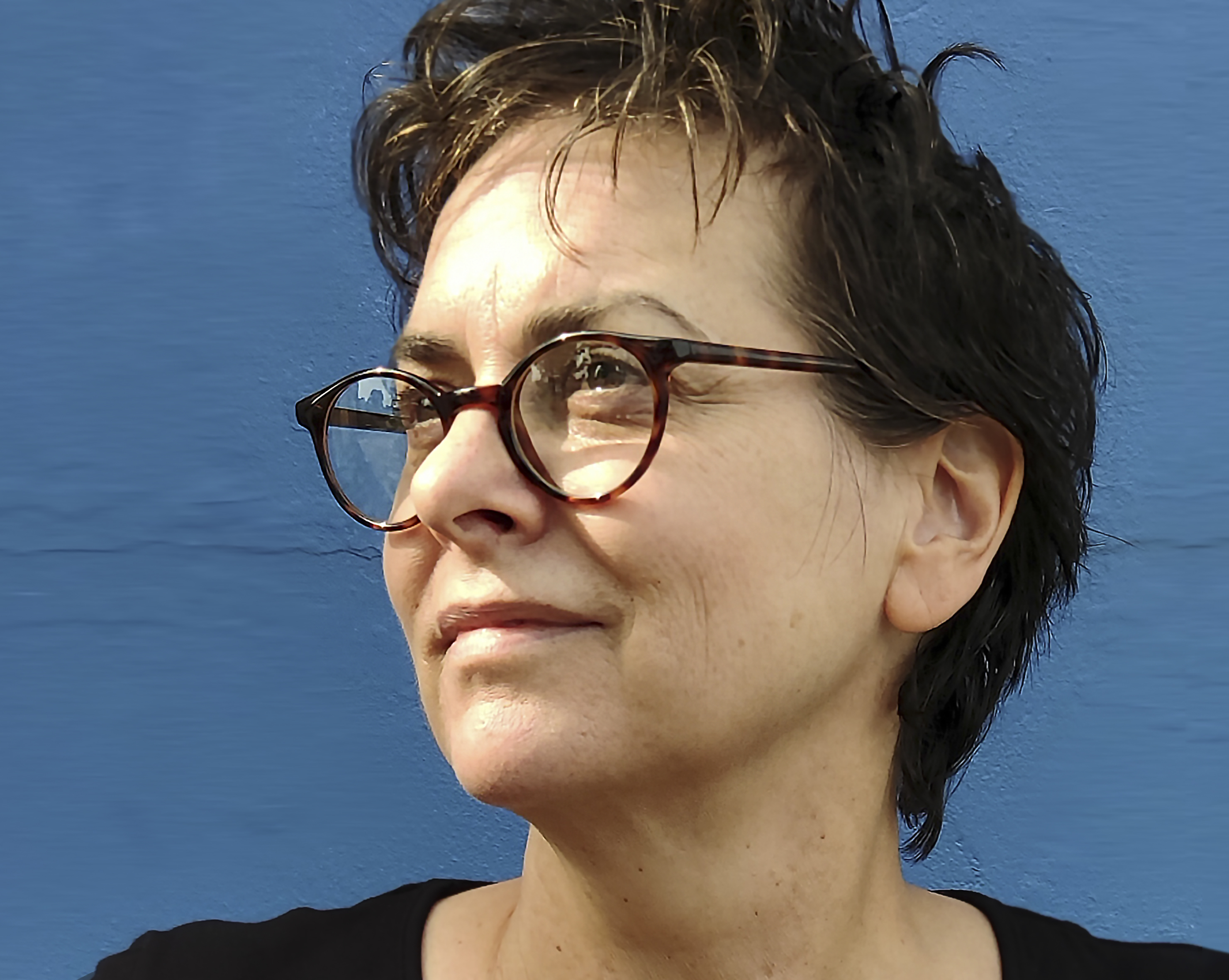
- Albiston c. 2020
- Born: 30 September 1961; Melbourne, Victoria, Australia
- Died: 28 February 2022 (aged 60)
- Education: Victorian College of the Arts; La Trobe University
- Spouse: Michael Young Ian McBryde Andy Szikla (m. 2014)
- Children: Jess, Caleb

Jordie Albiston (30 September 1961 – 28 February 2022) was an Australian poet.

== Early life ==
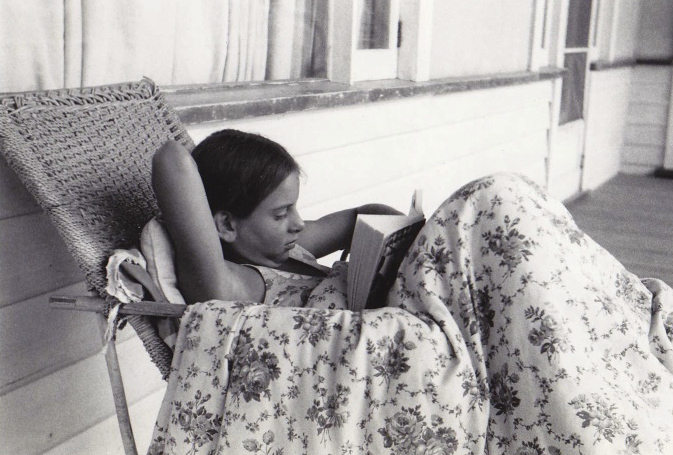
Jordie Albiston c.1970

Jordie Albiston grew up in Melbourne, the second of four children. She studied music at the Victorian College of the Arts before completing a doctorate in English at La Trobe University.

== Career ==
Albiston's first collection of poems, Nervous Arcs, won the Mary Gilmore Award, was runner-up in the Anne Elder Award and Shortlisted for the New South Wales Premier's Prize. Her next two books were documentary collections, respectively concerning the first European women in the Port Jackson and Botany Bay settlements and Jean Lee, the last woman hanged in Australia.

Botany Bay Document was later transformed into a performance work entitled Dreaming Transportation by Sydney composer Andrée Greenwell. In 2003, the performance premiered at the Sydney Festival, and in 2004 was staged again at the Sydney Opera House featuring Deborah Conway. The ABC RN studio production of this work won the Grand Prix Marulic (Croatia). Twenty years after its original publication, Hannah Kent featured Botany Bay Document in her essay "Australia in Three Books" (Meanjin 2016).

In 2006, Albiston's biographical verse The Hanging of Jean Lee was used as the text for an opera created by Andrée Greenwell. Featuring Max Sharam, it was first staged at the Sydney Opera House in The Studio. The libretto of this work was subsequently shortlisted for the Victorian Premier's Prize for Best Music Theatre Script, and the opera was remounted in Melbourne in 2013.

Albiston's fourth book, The Fall, a collection of chained verse, was shortlisted for premiers' prizes in Victoria, New South Wales and Queensland. This was followed by Vertigo: a cantata, which utilises musical structures and devices in place of traditional organisational techniques and punctuation.

Albiston's sixth collection, the sonnet according to 'm', won the 2010 New South Wales Premier's Prize and was runner-up in the Chief Minister's Award (Australian Capital Territory).

[K]indness is a hand-bound limited edition artists' book, with etchings by Sheree Kinlyside in response to one poem.

[T]he Book of Ethel consists of "perfect square" syllabic rhymed stanzas, charting the life of Albiston's Cornish great-grandmother. XIII Poems brought together commissioned poems written between 2009 and 2013.

Jack & Mollie (& Her) is a book-length poem comprising decasyllabic cinquains. Albiston had dogs with these names so it is likely the narrative is autobiographical. This title was twice noted in Australian Book Review 2016 Books of the Year.

Euclid's dog: 100 algorithmic poems uses various mathematical concepts and proofs as bases for its eight poetic forms. "This is not a book of high mathematics: rather an attempt to migrate some of the innate robustness, austerity and elegance of Euclidean thought into the realm of poetic structure". Euclid's dog was chosen as one of the Australian Book Review 2017 Books of the Year and shortlisted for the Queensland and New South Wales premiers' prizes in 2018.

A collection of found poems based on the letters and postcards from WWI Victorian soldiers, Warlines was written on a State Library of Victoria Fellowship. In the Australian Book Review, David McCooey refers to this work as "a masterpiece ... Albiston reworks her source material into highly formal and stylised linguistic works. Warlines is – like her other collections – a technical tour de force". It was subsequently celebrated as a Book of the Year in the Australian Book Review (2018).

[E]lement: the atomic weight & radius of love extends Albiston's longstanding conversation with mathematics and poetic form into the realm of science. These love poems are structured according to numerical facets of atomic theory, while embracing various historical aspects, anecdotes and fancies associated with the 70 or so elements included here. "Using chemistry as a trope, Albiston tabulates the human predicament of love: its foundations and fundamentals; its configuration of emotions; its recurring properties; and its assumption of elements yet to be defined." This title was shortlisted for the Australian Literature Society Gold Medal 2020 and the 2021 New South Wales Premier's Prize.

Fifteeners is a collection of 15-line sonnets. Here Albiston reinvents the sonnet structure, trading metre for syllabics, and employing fifteen lines in lieu of the traditional fourteen. "Themes of destruction and loss, hope and wonder, and the pressing state of an unstable world, are coded like enduring questions into the machinery of these extraordinary poems."

Albiston's work is well-represented in anthologies and has been translated into a number of languages. She has an entry in Who's Who in Twentieth-Century World Poetry and is mentioned in The Cambridge Companion to Australian Literature and The Princeton Encyclopedia of Poetry and Poetics (4th ed.). Critical analyses of her work can be found in publications such as Axon, Biography (US), Feeding the Ghost: Criticism on Contemporary Australian Poetry, Truth and Beauty: Verse Biography in Canada, Australia and New Zealand (NZ), Reclaiming Romanticism: Towards an Ecopoetics of Decolonization (UK), Humanities for the Environment: Integrating knowledge, forging new constellations of practice (UK) and Westerly. She is referred to as a major Australian poet in the Australian Book Review.

Composers who have set Albiston's poetry to music include Andrew Ford (Australia), Leonard Lehrman (United States), Barry McKimm (Australia), Raffaele Marcellino (Australia), Rachel Merton (Australia), Peter Skoggard (Canada) and Kezia Yap (Australia).

Albiston was selected by The Age for its annual Top 100 list of "Melbourne's most influential, inspirational and creative people" in 2010, and is featured on podcasts on ABC Radio National (2019) and the Australian Book Review Podcast (2020). She received the Patrick White Literary Award in 2019 for her "outstanding contribution to Australian literature" (Perpetual Trustees), and was a finalist in the 2021 triennial career award, the Melbourne Prize for Literature.

== Personal life ==
Albiston died on 28 February 2022, at the age of 60.

== Genre ==
Structuralism, mathematics, documentary.

== Awards and nominations ==
- 1991 – winner Convocation Prize (La Trobe University, Melbourne)
- 1991 – joint winner Wesley Michel Wright Prize
- 1992 – winner David Myers University Medal (La Trobe University, Melbourne)
- 1994 – highly commended Queensland Premier's Poetry Award for Botany Bay Document (a selection)
- 1996 – winner Mary Gilmore Award for Nervous Arcs
- 1996 – runner-up FAW Anne Elder Award for Nervous Arcs
- 1996 – shortlisted NSW Premier's Literary Award, Kenneth Slessor Prize for Poetry for Nervous Arcs
- 1997 – recipient D.J. (Dinny) O’Hearn Memorial Fellowship (University of Melbourne)
- 1999 – runner-up Gwen Harwood Memorial Prize for 'The Fall'
- 2003 – winner MusicOz Best Classical Composition for 'Dreaming Transportation'; composer Andrée Greenwell
- 2003 – shortlisted Victorian Premier's Literary Award, C.J. Dennis Prize for Poetry for The Fall
- 2003 – shortlisted Queensland Premier's Literary Award, Judith Wright Calanthe Prize for Poetry for The Fall
- 2004 – winner Poem of the Millennium (Melbourne Poets Union) for 'Numbers of Reasons to be Grateful'
- 2004 – shortlisted NSW Premier's Literary Award, Kenneth Slessor Prize for Poetry for The Fall
- 2004 – winner Grand Prix Marulic, Croatia, for CD Dreaming Transportation; composer Andrée Greenwell
- 2008 – shortlisted Victorian Premier's Prize for Best Music Theatre Script for The Hanging of Jean Lee; composer Andrée Greenwell
- 2010 – winner NSW Premier's Literary Award, Kenneth Slessor Prize for Poetry for the sonnet according to 'm'
- 2010 – runner-up Chief Minister's Award (ACT) for the sonnet according to 'm'
- 2011 – writer-in-residence, Cornwall, UK (Hypatia Trust)
- 2013 – winner National Fine Music FM Young Composers Award for 'A Brief History of Love'; composer Rachel Merton
- 2016 – recipient WWI Centenary Fellowship (State Library of Victoria)
- 2016 – shortlisted Josephine Ulrick Poetry Prize for 'Boy'
- 2017 – shortlisted Queensland Premier's Literary Award for Euclid's dog
- 2018 – shortlisted NSW Premier's Literary Award, Kenneth Slessor Prize for Poetry for Euclid's dog
- 2019 – winner Patrick White Award for contribution to Australian literature
- 2020 – shortlisted Australian Literature Society Gold Medal for element: the atomic weight & radius of love
- 2021 – recipient Creative Arts Fellowship in Australian Writing (National Library of Australia)
- 2021 – shortlisted NSW Premier's Literary Award, Kenneth Slessor Prize for Poetry for element: the atomic weight & radius of love
- 2021 – finalist Melbourne Prize for Literature
- 2022 – shortlisted Adelaide Festival Awards for Literature John Bray Poetry Award for Fifteeners
- 2022 – shortlisted, Prime Minister's Literary Award for poetry 2022 for Fifteeners
- 2024 – shortlisted, ALS Gold Medal for Frank

== Bibliography ==
=== Poetry ===
- Nervous Arcs (Spinifex, 1995)
- Botany Bay Document: a poetic history of the women of Botany Bay (Black Pepper publishing, 1996; reprinted 2003, 2013)
- The Hanging of Jean Lee (Black Pepper publishing, 1998; reprinted 2004, 2013)
- My Secret Life (Wagtail #15: Picaro Press, 2002)
- The Fall (White Crane Press, 2003)
- Vertigo: a cantata (John Leonard Press, 2007)
- the sonnet according to 'm' (John Leonard Press, 2009)
- kindness (artists' book: Red Rag Press, 2013)
- the Book of Ethel (Puncher & Wattmann, 2013)
- XIII Poems (Rabbit Poets Series #1: Rabbit Poetry Press, 2013)
- Jack & Mollie (& Her) (UQP, 2016)
- Euclid's dog: 100 algorithmic poems (GloriaSMH, 2017)
- Warlines (Hybrid Press, 2018)
- The Cyprus Poems (Picaro Press, 2018)
- element: the atomic weight & radius of love (Puncher & Wattmann, 2019)
- book: 15-line sonnets (artists' book: Life Before Man Press, 2021)
- Fifteeners (Puncher & Wattmann, 2021)
- Frank, illustrated by photographs by Frank Hurley (NLA Publishing, 2023)

=== Children's poetry ===
- Sukie's Suitcase: three picture-poems (Little Barrow Press, 2018)
- Barkwoofggrrr... (ill. Lucy Pulvers: Little Barrow Press, 2019)
- Esmé d'Arc Adds Up to More than Zero (ill. Lucy Pulvers: Little Steps Publishing, 2021)

=== Editor ===
- The Weekly Poem: 52 exercises in closed & open forms (Puncher & Wattmann, 2014; reprinted 2018)
- Prayers of a Secular World (with Kevin Brophy: Inkerman & Blunt, 2015)
