= Lydia Jennings =

Native American environmental scientist and researcher

- Born: Santa Fe, New Mexico
- Education: University of Arizona (PhD)
- Alma mater: California State University, Monterey Bay, University of Arizona
- Scientific career
- Thesis: Challenges in governance authority and revegetation of mining lands (2020)
- Doctoral advisor: Raina Maier and Julie Neilson

Lydia L. Jennings is a Native American soil microbiologist and environmental scientist. Her research interests are soil health, environmental remediation, indigenous science, mining policy, and environmental data ownership by tribal nations. She works with organizations initiatives that support Indigenous geoscientists and the integration of geoscience with Indigenous knowledge. Her work is featured in the 2020 documentary Run to Be Visible, produced by Patagonia.

== Early life and education ==
Jennings grew up in Santa Fe, New Mexico and is a member of two indigenous tribes - the Huichol (Wixáritari) and Pascua Yaqui (Yoeme). Jennings received an associate of science in biology from Cabrillo College, and a bachelors of science in environmental science, technology and policy, with a minor in chemistry, from California State University, Monterey Bay. Jennings completed her Ph.D. from the University of Arizona in 2020, focusing on the identification and characterization of microbial indicators as tools to evaluate mine waste reclamation, with her minor research in American Indian Policy focusing on the laws around mining on federal lands to which tribes have ancestral claims.

== Research career ==
Jennings main areas of research focus on fate, transport, and biogeochemistry of environmental pollutants, bioremediation, and environmental justice for underrepresented groups.

After completion of her undergraduate degree and before attending graduate school, Jennings worked for a couple of years studying water pollution at a field station in Big Sur in California. It was at this time Jennings began thinking about using her science skills to serve the places she was from, especially for topics such as environmental issues caused by mining. Her current work focuses on identifying soil health biogeochemical indicators of soil reclamation, in order to make modern mining reclamation more effective and cost efficient, while also tracking how policy has placed many mines on/or bordering tribal nations and extraction on public lands.

Jennings has been part of the Indigenous Food Knowledges Network (IFKN) and in June 2019 went to Alaska to visit the Chickaloon Village to learn about food and land systems. Jennings credits her involvement with the American Indian Science and Engineering Society (AISES) in graduate school for helping develop her research skills and to envision ways to honor Indigenous data sources and contributions, connecting the geosciences with cultural identity.

In addition to her international conference presentations on topics such as Biogeophysical Soil Constituents Associated with Revegetation Success of Reclaimed Mine Tailings in Southern Arizona, Jennings has presented on Indigenous data governance and Indigenous-led collaborations across biomes. Jennings utilized her time as an American Geophysical Union Voices of Science advocate "to increase visibility of Indigenous scientists, and how we are not just the “subject” of scientific inquiry, but rather, are continuing our traditions of scientific practices held within cultural and environmental knowledge."

When her May 2020 graduate education was canceled due to the COVID-19 pandemic, Jennings decided to run 50 miles in honor of the Indigenous scientists and knowledge keepers who came before her. Her run was recorded and produced as a 19-minute documentary titled Run to Be Visible and released on Patagonia's YouTube channel as part of their "Run to" series.

Jennings is often accompanied by her fieldwork assistant, a blue heeler named Salchicha whom she adopted in 2019.

== Awards and honors ==
Jennings is the recipient of multiple institutional and national honors, including:

- 2015 - National Science Foundation Graduate Research Fellow
- 2018 - American Indian Science & Engineering Society's Rising Leader Award
- 2019 - American Geophysical Union Voices for Science Fellow
- 2019 - Native Nations Institute Indigenous Data Sovereignty Fellow
- 2019 - Southwest Climate Adaptation Natural Resources Workforce Fellow
