= Highway Bodies =

2019 novel by Alison Evans

- Author: Alison Evans
- Language: English
- Genre: Young adult fiction
- Publisher: Echo Publishing
- Publication date: 2019
- Publication place: Australia
- ISBN: 9781760685027

Highway Bodies is a 2019 young adult post-apocalyptic novel by Alison Evans. It tells the story of a group of young people attempting to survive a zombie apocalypse as a found family in regional Victoria. While grappling with the lack of information and life on the run, they also "navigate issues of friendship, gender, and identity". As is common in Evans' work, many of the characters are queer and transgender.
