= Eamon Flack =

Australian theatre director

Eamon Flack is an Australian theatre director. He is the Artistic Director of Belvoir, a theatre company in Sydney's Surry Hills.

Flack, who grew up in Darwin, Northern Territory, was encouraged towards a career in theatre by actor Bille Brown when studying at the University of Queensland, where Brown was an adjunct professor. Flack studied acting at the Western Australian Academy of Performing Arts. Flack become Literary Manager and later Associate Director at Belvoir, before being appointed Artistic Director from 2016.

Two productions Flack directed for Belvoir have won Best Play at the Helpmann Awards, Angels in America in 2014 and The Glass Menagerie in 2015. He was nominated for a Helpmann Award for Best Direction of a Play in 2016 for Belvoir's production of Ivanov.

Flack was credited as the associate writer of Counting and Cracking, written by S. Shakthidharan, which won both the Victorian Prize for Literature and the Victorian Premier's Prize for Drama at the 2020 Victorian Premier's Literary Awards. He cowrote The Jungle and the Sea with S. Shakthidharan, which won the 2024 Victorian Premier's Prize for Drama.
