= Eggshell Skull (book) =

2018 memoir by Bri Lee

- Author: Bri Lee
- Language: English
- Subject: Non-fiction
- Published: 2018 (Allen & Unwin)
- Publication place: Australia
- Media type: Print (Paperback)
- Pages: 368
- ISBN: 9781760295776

Eggshell Skull is a 2018 non-fiction memoir by Australian author Bri Lee. It details Lee's experiences as a judge's associate in Brisbane's District Court of Queensland, where she oversees many cases, including those involving sexual harassment and assault. Two years into her job, she returns as the complainant in her own case.

First published in Australia in July 2018 by Allen & Unwin, the memoir has been widely well received, including winning the People's Choice Award at the 2019 Victorian Premier's Literary Awards, and being a recipient of the Davitt Award for debut novel and the Ned Kelly Award for best true crime in the same year.

== Premise ==
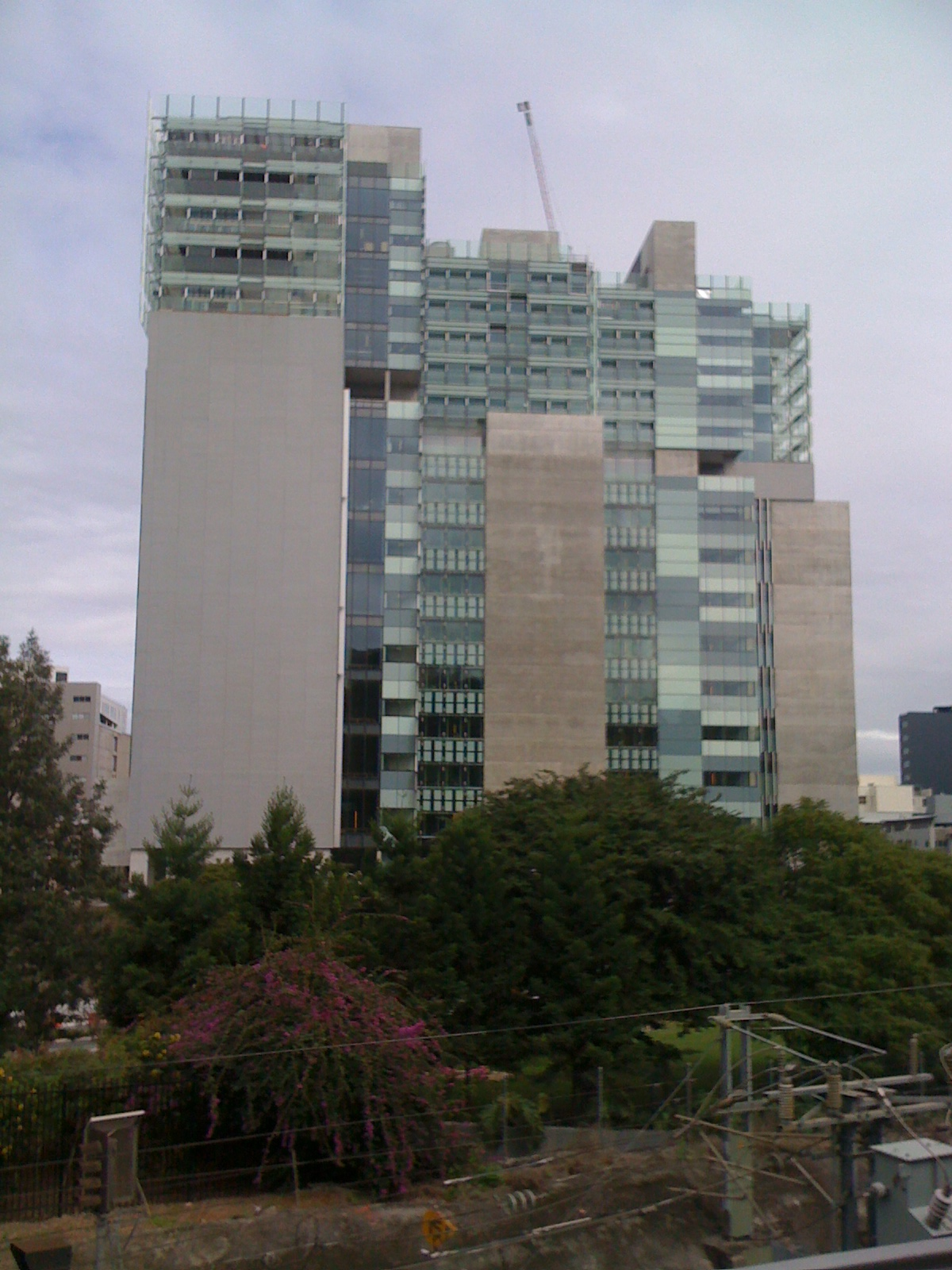
Brisbane's Supreme and District Court

Bri Lee, a law graduate from Queensland, begins her job as a judge's associate in Brisbane at the Supreme and District Court. She is confronted by a barrage of cases, many of them involving acts of violence and sexual assault against women. Many of the perpetrators are not brought to justice. Prejudice against the female victims and an overall patriarchal influence upon the general public is noted in many cases. This causes some instability for Lee, who begins to engage in acts of self-harm and alcoholism.

Her long-term boyfriend, Vincent, and a tight-knit family (consisting of a policeman father and an artist mother) make up her support network. Despite these solid personal relationships, Lee is plagued by her past: being a witness daily to the injustices in Queensland's District Court force her to confront her own traumatic childhood sexual abuse at the hands of her brother's teenage friend Samuel.

Two years into her career as a judge's associate, she brings forward her own case against Samuel.

== Title ==
The Eggshell Skull is named after the legal doctrine which stipulates that a defendant in a criminal case must "take their victim as they find them".

== Film adaptation ==
Funding for story development for a film adaptation was granted by Screen Australia in March 2023.

== See also ==
- Feminism in Australia
