= Indigenous science =

Indigenous knowledge engaged with the scientific method

Indigenous science is the application and intersection of Indigenous knowledge and science. This field is based on careful observation of the environment, and through experimentation. It is a holistic field, informed by physical, social, mental and cultural knowledge. When applied to ecology and the environment, it can be sometimes termed traditional ecological knowledge. Indigenous science involves the knowledge systems and practices of Indigenous peoples, which are rooted in their cultural traditions and relationships to their indigenous context. There are some similar methods of Western science including (but not limited to): observation, prediction, interpretation, and questioning. There are also some areas in which Western science and Indigenous science differ. Indigenous knowledge is place and case-specific and does not attempt to label or generalize natural processes. Western science strives to find commonalities and theories that can be applied to all areas, such as Newton's Laws of Physics. This is because most Indigenous knowledge stems from the relationship humans have with their environment, which is passed down through stories or is discovered through observation. Western knowledge takes a different approach by isolating targets to study, splitting them from their surroundings and making sets of assumptions and theories. Community is a larger aspect of Indigenous science, and conclusions are shared through oral tradition and family knowledge, whereas most Western science research is published in a journal specific to that scientific field, and may restrict access to various papers.

There is a history of oppression against Native Americans beginning when settlers came to America, and this has carried into the field of Indigenous science as American scientists and academics have overlooked the findings and knowledge of Indigenous people. Multiple studies found that Indigenous perspectives are rarely represented in empirical studies, and has led to the underrepresentation of Native people in research fields. In addition, Western researchers have benefitted from the research they do about Indigenous nations, while the tribes do not receive compensation for their work and information.

In addition to a lack of compensation, Indigenous peoples in Canada have also been subjected to unethical and exploitative research practices. In the 1930s and 1940s, Canadian researchers subjected approximately 600 Indigenous infants to “human experimental work,” reportedly using them as “guinea pigs” to collect data related to the tuberculosis vaccine.These practices have been cited as part of a broader history of colonial research, in which Indigenous communities were treated as objects of study rather than as peoples with autonomy, consent, and rights.

Higher recognition and advocacy of Indigenous people in the 21st century has increased the visibility of this field. There has been a growing recognition of the potential benefits of incorporating Indigenous perspectives and knowledge, particularly in fields such as ecology and environmental management.

== Oral traditions in Indigenous science ==
Indigenous knowledge and experiences are often passed down orally from generation to generation. Indigenous knowledge has an empirical basis and has traditionally been used to predict and understand the world. Such knowledge has informed studies of human management of natural processes.

This oral knowledge is embedded in songs and dances, which allows for accurate information to be passed down for centuries as songs and dances are easier to remember, and harder to change than spoken stories. Oral histories are not fairy tales or legends, but have arisen through intense observation and are a critical part of Indigenous culture.

For instance, in Australian aboriginal tribes, oral traditions are a key tool for passing information of geological events. One recent application was the discovery of the Henbury Meteorite site, as songs and dances from various aboriginal tribes marked when and where the meteorite touched down, while no Western historians had been able to determine its placement. Oral storytelling is also used to map ocean levels after the most recent ice age, and is used in astronomy, ecology, and agriculture.

== In ecology ==
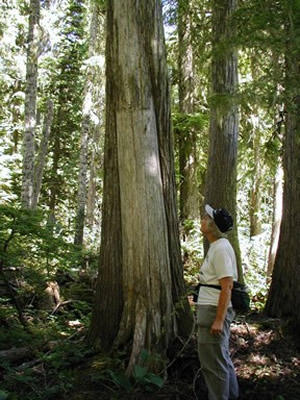
Culturally modified trees (CMTs) are when resources from a tree are used in a way that does not kill the tree itself.

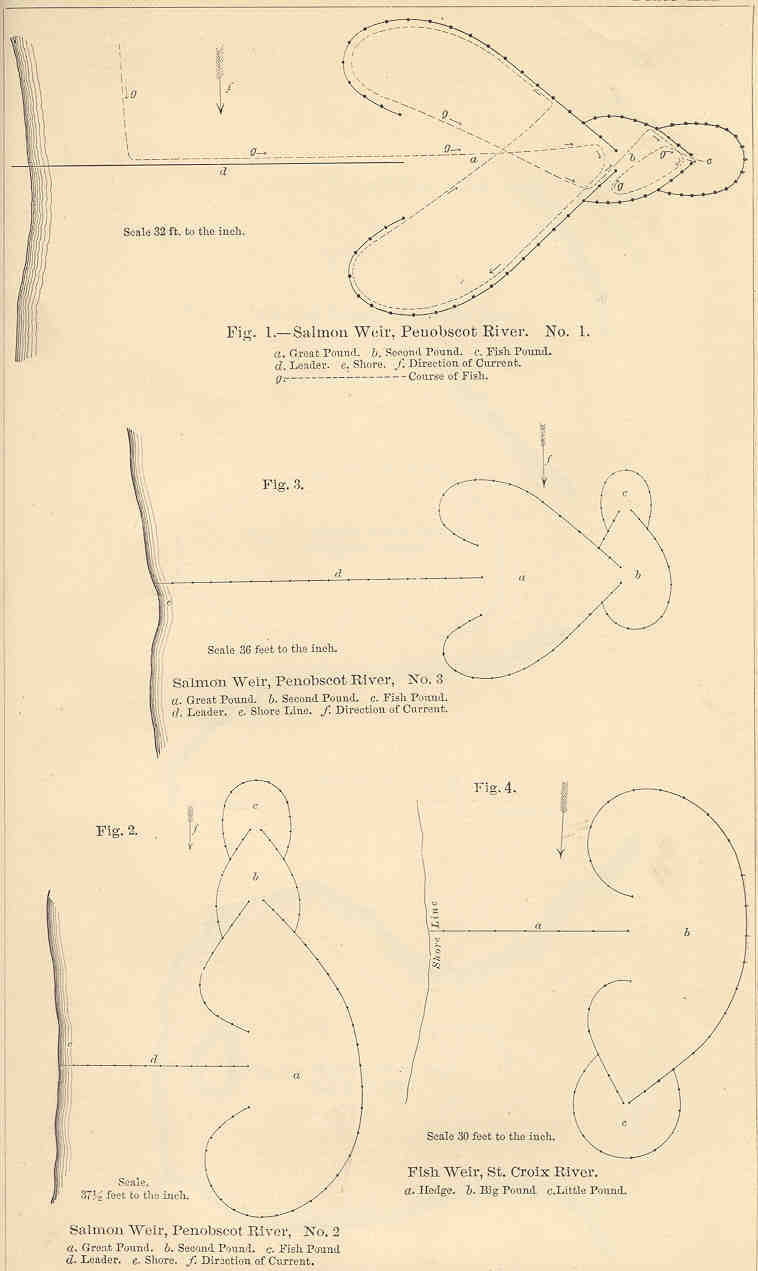
Illustration of fish weir, designed to guide salmon in the enclosure to be hand selected as a way to manage the salmon population to ensure healthy runs the following year.

Indigenous science is related to the term "traditional ecological knowledge" or "TEK" which is specific category of Indigenous science that applies to the natural world, usually focused on agriculture, sustainability and wildlife.

The study of ecology focuses on the relationships and patterns between organisms in their environment. TEK is place-based, so the information and understanding that is applied to this field from Indigenous groups is context-dependent. One example of such work is ethnobiology which employs Indigenous knowledge and botany to identify and classify species. TEK has been used to provide perspectives on matters such as how a declining fish population affects nature, the food web, and coastal ecosystems.

Indigenous science has helped to address ecological challenges including the restoration of salmon, management of seabird harvests, outbreaks of hantavirus, and addressing wildfires. As well as in ecology, Indigenous knowledge has been used in biological areas including animal behavior, evolution, physiology, life history, morphology, wildlife conservation, wildlife health, and taxonomy.

== Place based sciences ==
Indigenous science may offer a different perspective from what is traditionally thought of as "science". In particular, Indigenous science is tied to territory, cultural practices, and experiences/teachings in explicit ways that are often absent in normal scientific discourse.

Place based Indigenous science also is common outside of the academic sphere. Climatology scientists in Alaska and the Artic commonly work with traditional knowledge (Qaujimajatuqangit) among the Inuit when studying long-term changes in sea ice, along with studying other aspects of biology. In the Canadian Arctic, large data organizations like the Inuvialuit Settlement Region Online Platform, Marxan, and Nunaliit Atlas Framework inform marine and coastal management practices by using Inuit knowledge. Many times, this information is passed down in Inuit communities by generation using oral tradition and informs the communities on harvesting, hunting, traveling, and living on the land. This information may apply to decisions on conservation of harvesting sties and mating sites of various animals in the Artic. Inuit knowledge of these areas includes seasonal variations, ecological dynamics, wind direction, and ice dynamics. This knowledge has been gained through historical memories, family and community relations, place names, and open water or sea ice routes.

Place names are common in many different Indigenous groups cultures, and are relevant for ecological knowledge. In Inuit communities, place names indicate group knowledge, memories, experiences and observations of the area. One example is Salliq, an island east of Igloolik. Salliq means "the furthest island from the mainland", and contextualizes the island in reference to its surroundings. Place names are also common in Kānaka Maoli culture, or Native Hawaiian culture. One example is the naming of mountains and craters. Halemaʻumaʻu is a crater on Hawaiʻi and means "House [surrounded by] ʻamaʻu ferns." This name is tied both to ecology, and to oral histories of the Kānaka Maoli, as it tells of a battle between two supernatural beings - Pele and Kamapuaʻa, but also describes that this crater is home to the largest tree ferns on the island.

== Education ==
Collaboration between Indigenous communities and research scientists can be seen in Indigenous-led projects and community work enacted as a starting point for the collaborations. This collaboration has steadily been increasing, one reason being higher education, especially at Tribal Colleges and Universities (TCU) and Native American-Serving Nontribal Institutions (NASNTI). Many TCUs offer associates degrees, while 19 offer a bachelor's degree and 3 universities offer a masters (Haskell Indian Nations University, the Institute of American Indian and Alaska Native Culture and Arts Development, and Sinte Gleska University). TCUs were created to give American Indian and Alaska Native students education, but students from other demographics can attend as well. There are many barriers to higher education, especially for historically marginalized and underrepresented groups. TCUs are a way to overcome these barriers. These universities are usually located close to reservations and serve low-income students, allowing education to be accessible to Native Americans. TCUs also provide a platform for scientific advancement and action, as Haskell University hosted their first symposium on climate change in November, 2024. This event connected Haskell students and professors with individuals from larger public and private research universities, such as University of Kansas, University of Missouri-Kansas City, UCLA and Harvard.

== Indigenous technologies ==
The definition of technology is "the application of scientific knowledge for practical purposes, especially in industry." Examples of Indigenous technologies that were developed for specific use based on their location and culture include: clam gardens, fish weirs, and culturally modified trees (CMTs). Indigenous technologies are available in a wide range of subjects such as: agri- and mari-culture, fishing, forest management and resource exploitation, astronomy, atmospheric, and land based management techniques.

=== Agriculture ===
Indigenous tribes that utilize agriculture technologies include the Haudenosaunee (Iroquois), O'odham, Wampanoag, Cherokee, Great Lakes tribes (including the Menominee, Ojibwe, and Potawatomi) and more. Some of these agricultural techniques are based on a mixed-crop, shifting cultivation system growing corn, beans, and squash together in the same mounds; an inter-cropping system known as the three sisters. The use of the three sisters originated in the 1100s in Mesoamerica and is known as milpa, and diffused throughout North America and Canada. In this horticultural technique, each plant offers something to the others, thus improving the crop yield. Corn is a high-caloric food, supported by the beans, which provide nitrogen from nitrogen-fixing bacteria that live on their roots, and squash provide ground cover (suppresses weeds and keeps soil moist). Other crops incorporated in the inter-cropping system included sunflowers or grains like barley or maygrass.

=== Engineering ===
Many different Indigenous tribes in America have built homes from natural resources. One example can be found at Chaco Canyon and Mesa Verde, or Anasazi, in Northwestern New Mexico and Southwestern Colorado. Ancestral Puebloans built houses on the ground near the cliffs of the Colorado Plateau, and carved others into the face of the cliff, ultimately spanning almost 10,000 square miles across Utah, Colorado and New Mexico. Mesa Verde and Chaco Canyon both have more than 600 rooms each, many of which were made from sandstone that was carved into rectangular blocks, and glued together with a mix of mud and water. In addition to physically building these homes, the Ancestral Puebloans used mathematical knowledge like the golden ratio - which has been used to make the Egyptian pyramids, Ancient Greek architecture and the Notre Dame - to construct a Sun Temple.

Water management was critical as well in this area, and ancestral Pueblo people had early knowledge of hydrological theory, water transport and storage. This allowed them to create four main reservoirs that helped sustain the population.

The Hohokam tribe in Arizona also managed their water resources up until 1450, and created irrigation networks that were more extensive than any other irrigation system created during their time. This allowed an influx of agriculture, as canals spread across 135 miles of land and brought water to crops far from the rivers. Ultimately, the population of Hohokam became too large to sustain in the late 15th century, and the irrigation systems failed. However, their descendants, the Akimel O'odham and Tohono O'odham people, continue to live in Phoenix, Arizona and surrounding areas, and farming continues to be an important part of their cultures.

=== Forestry ===
The Menominee tribe in Wisconsin operates the Menominee Forest which covers 217,000 acres of land, and promotes sustainable forest management. For more than 150 years, the Menominee tribe has been utilizing techniques such as silviculture, even and uneven-aged management, tree grouping, and conservation. Silviculture is the practice of developing and managing forests and takes into consideration the age of the tree, the species, shade tolerance, and the health of the entire forest. Even-aged management cultivates shade intolerant trees, and relies on wind and fire disturbances. The Menominee forestry workers mimic these natural disturbances with various treatments like group openings and clear cuts. Uneven-aged management favors trees that are shade tolerant by only cutting a couple in one area, as to not leave any land fully bare. Their strategies have been effective, as there is currently more timber on the land than when the business was in its early management, in 1854. This forest land has been recognized by the United Nations and was certified by the Forest Stewardship Council, a prestigious label given to responsible forestry departments.

=== Wayfinding ===
Polynesian and Hawaiian Wayfinders have been trained to navigate the oceans using stars, the sun, and the ocean swells to understand where a vessel is when it is at sea. This requires understanding of trade winds, currents, astronomy, fish and weather cycles. Wayfinding was only possible due to more than 1,500 years of practice and observation by Pacific Islanders. Currently, there is a reclamation movement for wayfinding, which started in the 1970s, when one voyaging canoe, the Hōkūle'a, was created by the Polynesian Wayfinding Society with the purpose of bringing back this traditional practice and reclaiming culture. The Hōkūle'a has made multiple voyages, the first being from Maui to Tahiti and has inspired multiple other voyaging canoes to set out, and for education of wayfinding to increase.

== Notable scholars ==
- Nancy C. Maryboy
- Karlie Noon
- Lydia Jennings
- Ian Saem Majnep
- Robin Wall Kimmerer
- Wendy F. K’ah Skaahluwaa Todd
