= Euphoria Kids =

2020 novel by Alison Evans

- Second edition
- Author: Alison Evans
- Language: English
- Genre: Young adult fiction
- Publisher: Echo Publishing
- Publication date: 2020
- Publication place: Australia
- ISBN: 9781760688820

Euphoria Kids is a 2020 young adult fantasy novel by Alison Evans. It tells the coming of age story of three transgender young people named Iris, Babs and "the boy". The story contains elements of magical realism, including the presence of witches, dryads and faeries, and that Iris "grew from a seed in the ground" while Babs is "made of fire".

The title refers to the concept of gender euphoria. Evans states in the novel's foreword:

I want people to learn about gender euphoria. I want them to learn about it before gender dysphoria. I want the young trans kids that will read this book to be proud of who they are, and to imagine wonderful, magic lives for themselves.

In 2024, the novel was reissued in an expanded second edition which added classroom discussion points.

== Reception ==
Meleika Gesa-Fatafehi of The Saturday Paper called Euphoria Kids "a love letter to queer and transgender teens... it’s exhilarating to read about these characters being so open about their identities, and living with such pride". Australian Arts Review found it "groundbreaking" and compared it favourably to the work of Francesca Lia Block and Studio Ghibli. Jemimah Brewster of Artshub agreed with the Ghibli comparison and speculated that YA readers "will love (Euphoria Kids) for its beautiful atmosphere as much as its portrayal of vital friendships". Jordi Kerr of Books + Publishing called the novel "quietly enchanting", adding that it "will not speak to every reader, but to those it does it will mean the world".
