= Grace Yee =

Australian poet and creative writing academic

- Born: British Hong Kong
- Education: University of Melbourne, PhD
- Occupations: Poet; creative writing teacher
- Writing career
- Notable work: Chinese Fish
- Notable awards: Victorian Prize for Literature; 2024 Chinese Fish

Grace Yee is a poet, writer and creative writing teacher. Her debut verse novel, Chinese Fish, won both the Victorian Prize for Literature and the Mary and Peter Biggs Award for Poetry in 2024.

== Early life and education ==
Yee was born in British Hong Kong and grew up in New Zealand and Australia.

She graduated from Deakin University with a MA. She later completed a PhD at the University of Melbourne. Her thesis was titled "Beneath the Long White Cloud: settler Chinese women's storytelling in Aotearoa New Zealand".

== Career ==
Yee has lectured at both Deakin University and the University of Melbourne. She was awarded a Creative Fellowship by the State Library of Victoria in 2019.

Her poems have been published in Australia in Overland, Island, Meanjin, Southerly, Westerly, Rabbit and Cordite Poetry Review. They have also appeared in The Shanghai Literary Review, Women's Museum of California, Hainamana and the Poetry New Zealand Yearbook.

She adapted her prizewinning verse novel, Chinese Fish, from her PhD thesis. The book was selected as winner of the 2024 Victorian Premier's Prize for Poetry from 807 entries. It subsequently won the 2024 Victorian Prize for Literature, the first win for poetry in ten years.

== Awards and recognition ==
- Overland Judith Wright Poetry Prize, 2019, third place for "Chinny Chin Chin"
- Winner, Patricia Hackett Prize, 2020, winner for "For the Chinese Merchants of Melbourne"
- Peter Steele Poetry Award, 2020
- Anne Elder Award, 2023, highly commended for Chinese Fish
- Victorian Prize for Literature and Victorian Premier's Prize for Poetry, 2024, winner for Chinese Fish
- Mary and Peter Biggs Award for Poetry, Ockham New Zealand Book Awards, 2024, winner for Chinese Fish

== Publications ==
- Josh: A History, Giramondo Publishing, 2025 ISBN 9781923106314
- Chinese Fish, Giramondo Publishing, 2023 ISBN 9781922725448
- "For the Chinese Merchants of Melbourne", published in Best of Australian Poems 2021, Ellen van Neerven and Toby Fitch, editors, ISBN 9780992318925
- "Tabulations (A Nine Year)", published in Best of Australian Poems 2022, Judith Beveridge and Jeanine Leane, editors, ISBN 9780992318925
- "chinny chin chin" and other selected works, published in A Clear Dawn: New Asian Voices from Aotearoa (anthology), editors Alison Wong and Paula Morris, ISBN 9781922725448
