= Ida (novel) =

2017 novel by Alison Evans

- Author: Alison Evans
- Language: English
- Genre: Young adult fiction, Science fiction
- Publisher: Echo Publishing
- Publication date: 2017
- Publication place: Australia
- Awards: Victorian Premier's Literary Award
- ISBN: 9781760404383

Ida is a 2017 young adult novel by Alison Evans. Set in the Dandenong Ranges, it tells the story of Ida Wagner, a young person who begins to encounter her own doppelgängers and realises she can both travel through short increments of time and also shift between parallel universes at will. Many of the novel's characters are transgender, including Daisy who is genderqueer and Frank who is transmasculine.

The book was inspired by a "Sliding Doors incident" in which Evans left the house for a party, but then returned home to change clothes and as a result narrowly missed out on a traffic accident.

Ida won the 2018 Victorian Premier's Literary Award in the People's Choice category.
