= Victorian Premier's Prize for Drama =

Literary Award

The Victorian Premier's Prize for Drama is a prize category in the annual Victorian Premier's Literary Awards. The winner of this category prize vies with four other category winners (fiction; non-fiction; poetry; young adult literature) for overall Victorian Prize for Literature.

Until 2012, the award was called the Louis Esson Prize for Drama.

== Victorian Premier's Prize for Drama ==
Winners of the Overall Victorian Prize for Literature have a blue ribbon.

Victorian Premier's Prize for Drama winners and finalists
Year	Author	Title	Result	Ref.
2012	Lally Katz	A Golem Story	Winner	
2012	Aidan Fennessy	National	Finalist	
2012	Daniel Keene	Boxman	Finalist	
2014 (Note: Prior to 2014, the award year was directly related to the year of publication. In 2014, the award year referred to books published in the previous year. That is, in 2012, the award went to books published in 2012. In 2014, the award went to books published in 2013.)	Patricia Cornelius	Savages	Winner	
2014	Kate Grenville	The Secret River	Finalist	
2014	Anne-Louise Sarks and Kate Mulvany	Medea	Finalist	
2015	Angus Cerini	Resplendence	Winner	
2015	Alison Croggon	Mayakovsky	Finalist	
2015	Daniel Keene	The Long Way Home	Finalist	
2016	Mary Anne Butler	Broken	Winner	
2016	Angela Betzien	Mortido	Finalist	
2016	Patricia Cornelius	SHIT	Finalist	
2016	Declan Greene	I am a Miracle	Highly commended	
2017	Leah Purcell	The Drover's Wife	Winner	
2017	Gita Bezard	Girl Shut Your Mouth	Finalist	
2017	Zoë Coombs Marr	Trigger Warning	Finalist	
2018	Michele Lee	Rice	Winner	
2018	Nakkiah Lui	Black is the New White	Finalist	
2018	Kate Mulvany	The Rasputin Affair	Finalist	
2019	Kendall Feaver	The Almighty Sometimes	Winner	
2019	Michele Lee	Going Down	Finalist	
2019	Ursula Yovich and Alana Valentine	Barbara and the Camp Dogs	Finalist	
2020	S. Shakthidharan (and associated writer Eamon Flack)	Counting and Cracking	Winner	
2020	Samah Sabawi	Them	Finalist	
2020	Meyne Wyatt	City of Gold	Finalist	
2021	Angus Cerini	Wonnangatta	Winner	
2021	Dan Giovannoni	SLAP. BANG. KISS.	Finalist	
2021	Andrea James	Sunshine Super Girl: The Evonne Goolagong Story	Finalist	
2021	Kendall Feaver	Wherever She Wanders	Highly Commend	
2021	Benjamin Law	Torch the Place	Highly Commend	
2022	Dylan Van Den Berg	Milk	Winner	
2022	Steve Perie	Return to the Dirt	Finalist	
2022	Melissa Reeves	Archimedes War	Finalist	
2022	Andrea James & Catherine Ryan	Dogged	Highly commend	
2023	John Harvey	The Return	Winner	
2023	Merlynn Tong	Golden Blood	Finalist	
2023	Dylan Van Den Berg	Whitefella Yella Tree	Finalist	
2024	Declan Furber Gillick	Jacky	Finalist	
2024	S. Shakthidharan and Eamon Flack	The Jungle and the Sea	Finalist	
2024	Christos Tsiolkas and Dan Giovannoni	Loaded	Finalist	
2025	Nathan Maynard	37	Winner	
2025	Emily Sheehan	Frame Narrative	Finalist	
2025	Angus Cerini	Into the Shimmering World	Finalist	
2026	Emilie Collyer	Super	Winner	
2026	Genevieve Hegney	Fly Girl	Finalist	
2026	Andrea James	The Black Woman of Gippsland	Finalist	

== Louis Esson Prize for Drama ==
Louis Esson Prize for Drama winners and finalists
Year	Author	Title	Result	Ref.
1985	David Allen	Cheapside	Winner	
1986	Janis Balodis	Too Young for Ghosts	Winner	
1987	Ben Lewin	A Matter of Convenience	Winner	
1988	Alma De Groen	The Rivers of China	Winner	
1989	Daniel Keene	Silent Partner	Winner	
1990	Sam Sejavka	The Hive	Winner	
1991	Katherine Thomson	Diving for Pearls	Winner	
1992	Jocelyn Moorhouse	Proof	Winner	
1993	Michael Gurr	Sex Diary of an Infidel	Winner	
1994	Louis Nowra	The Temple	Winner	
1995	Barry Dickins	Remembering Ronald Ryan	Winner	
1996	Joanna Murray-Smith	Honour	Winner	
1997	Michael Gurr	Jerusalem	Winner	
1998	Daniel Keene	Every Minute, Every Hour, Every Day	Winner	
1999	Catherine Zimdahl	Clark in Sarajevo	Winner	
2000	Hannie Rayson	Life After George	Winner	
2001	Peta Murray	Salt	Winner	
2002	Andrew Bovell	Holy Day	Winner	
2003	Joanna Murray-Smith	Rapture	Winner	
2004	Stephen Sewell	Myth, Propaganda and Disaster in Nazi Germany and Contemporary America	Winner	
2005	Melissa Reeves	The Spook	Winner	
2006	Stephen Sewell	Three Furies: Scenes from the Life of Francis Bacon	Winner	
2007	Jane Bodie	A Single Act	Winner	
2007	Kit Lazaroo	Asylum	Finalist	
2007	Stephen Sewell	It Just Stopped	Finalist	
2008	Andrew Bovell	When the Rain Stops Falling	Winner	
2008	Wesley Enoch	The Story of the Miracles at Cookie’s Table	Finalist	
2008	Michael Gow	Toy Symphony	Finalist	
2009	Lally Katz	Goodbye Vaudeville Charlie Mudd	Winner	
2009	Paul Galloway	Realism	Finalist	
2009	Damien Millar	The Modern International Dead	Finalist	
2010	Tom Holloway	And No More Shall We Part	Winner	
2010	Declan Greene	Moth	Finalist	
2010	Melissa Reeves	Furious Mattress	Finalist	
2011	Patricia Cornelius	Do not go gentle…	Winner	
2011	Jane Montgomery Griffiths	Sappho…in 9 fragments	Finalist	
2011	Raimondo Cortese	Intimacy	Finalist	
