= John Larkin (author) =

Australian writer (born 1963)

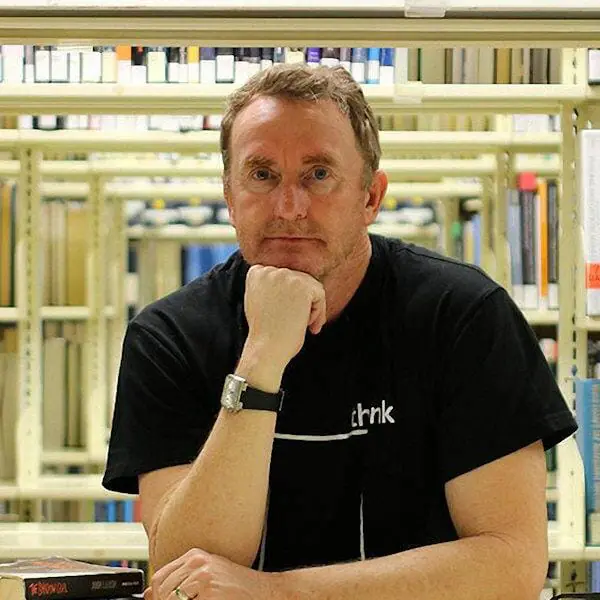
- John Brendan Larkin
- Born: John Brendan Larkin; 20 April 1963 (age 63); Maltby, West Riding of Yorkshire, England
- Occupation: Writer
- Children: 3
- Writing career
- Period: 1993–present
- Genre: Young adult fiction
- Notable works: The Shadow Girl; The Pause
- Notable awards: 2012 Victorian Premier's Award 2015 Queensland Literary Award

John Brendan Larkin (born 20 April 1963) is an Australian writer. He is best known for The Shadow Girl and The Pause, both published by Penguin Random House. The Pause was released in April 2015 and won the Griffith University Young Adult Book Award at the 2015 Queensland Literary Awards. The Shadow Girl won the 2012 Victorian Premier's Award for young adult fiction.

== Life and career ==
Larkin was born in the mining town of Maltby, then in the West Riding of Yorkshire (now South Yorkshire), England. His mother, Pat, was also from Maltby and his father Brendan is originally from Ireland. The family emigrated to Australia in the late 1960s landing in Sydney on Christmas Eve 1969. John is the middle child of three. He has an older sister Trish and a younger brother Paul who currently lives in Western Australia, although John currently lives in New South Wales. Larkin attended Toongabbie Public School and Pendle Hill High School. He studied English literature at Macquarie University, and graduated with a Bachelor of Arts, a Bachelor of Education and a master's degree in creative writing. He is now still writing books and also teaches at schools such as Knox Grammar Preparatory School, Abbotsleigh, and Ravenswood School for Girls, being a popular figure among students.

== Bibliography ==
Larkin, John (April 2015), The pause, North Sydney, N.S.W. Random House Australia (published 2015), ISBN 978-0-85798-170-7
