= Bri Lee =

Australian writer, editor and women's rights activist (born 1991)

- Born: 13 December 1991 (age 33); Queensland, Australia
- Occupation(s): Writer, activist, journalist
- Known for: Legal activism
- Notable work: Eggshell Skull
- Website: www.bri-lee.com

Brianna "Bri" Lee (born 13 December 1991) is an Australian author, journalist, and activist, known for her 2018 memoir Eggshell Skull.

== Early life ==
Brianna Lee was born in Queensland, Australia.

== Career ==
=== Writing and journalism ===
Lee's early writing work included a short story published in Voiceworks, while serving as the founder and editor of the (now defunct) feminist quarterly periodical Hot Chicks with Big Brains. Hot Chicks with Big Brains ran from 2015 until 2018, spanning seven issues. It featured articles and interviews with diverse women and non-binary people, including Darug elder Aunty Jacinta Tobin, Isabella Manfredi, Mehreen Faruqi, Ruby Tandoh, and Clementine Ford.

Lee's first book, the memoir Eggshell Skull was published by Allen & Unwin in early 2018. It describes Lee's experience as a complainant in the Australian court system for sexual abuse she was subjected to as a child, while simultaneously working as a Judge's Associate working on similar cases. The memoir was well received, winning several awards including the People's Choice Award at the 2019 Victorian Premier's Literary Awards, as well as the Davitt Award for debut novel and the Ned Kelly Award for best true crime in the same year. Funding for story development for a film adaptation was granted by Screen Australia in March 2023. In 2021, passages from Eggshell Skull were quoted in a parliamentary debate regarding reform to the criminal justice system in Queensland. In 2023, Lee's work was discussed in the Parliament of New South Wales after the second reading speech for the Criminal Procedure Amendment (Child Sexual Offence Evidence) Bill 2023.

In October 2019, Lee's essay Beauty was published by Allen & Unwin. In the essay, Lee examines her struggles with disordered eating. It was evaluated for its dissection of corporate middle class culture.

In 2020 Lee was appointed the Australian Copyright Agency's writer-in-residence at the University of Technology Sydney.

Her book, Who Gets to Be Smart, was published in 2021 by Allen & Unwin.

In 2022, Lee's journalism for The Saturday Paper investigated a 'loophole' whereby perpetrators of abuse were able to shield their assets from civil claims brought by their victims, by moving them into their superannuation. This was followed by further coverage by other outlets such as the ABC, and calls by Australian of the Year, Grace Tame for the government to enact reforms. The Australian Government subsequently pledged to close this loophole. Similarly, in 2023, Lee's investigative reporting into the financial affairs of Australian fashion label Ellery in The Monthly sparked further investigation and exposure by the ABC and other outlets. Lee was nominated for a Walkley Award for the piece.

Lee's debut novel, The Work, dealing with the development of a long-distance relationship between an art gallery owner in Chelsea, Manhattan, and a Queensland country boy turned art dealer, was published in 2024.

=== Advocacy and media ===
Together with Bond University's Professor Jonathan Crowe, Lee co-authored legal research and built ConsentLawQLD.com, a platform for the advocacy which led to the Queensland Attorney-General referring consent in rape and sexual assault to the Queensland Law Reform Commission in 2019.

Lee has been featured in advertising campaigns for brands including Sportsgirl, Mimco, Camilla and Marc, and Fashion Journal. Her advocacy has been recognised with a shortlisting for Women's Agenda Leadership Awards and a placement as one of the Australian Financial Review's "Women of Influence" in 2019.

In 2021, in partnership with the Women's Justice Network and Gleebooks, Lee launched the "fREADom INSIDE Project", an initiative facilitating the provision of books to inmates in women's correctional facilities in New South Wales.

Lee hosts the 'B List Bookclub', a monthly bookclub featuring Australian and international authors, with the State Library of New South Wales. Lee has made several appearances on the ABC program The Drum as well as appearing on Radio National, discussing issues such as law reform, and her written work.

== Awards ==
=== Honours ===
Year	Awards and fellowships
2016	Inaugural Kat Muscat Fellowship
2017	Griffith Review Queensland Writer's Fellowship
2018	Queensland Literary Awards – Premier's Young Publishers and Writers Award
2019	Australian Financial Review – Women of Influence 2019
2021	University of Queensland Alumni Award, for advocacy for survivors of sexual assault and for law reform

=== Literary awards ===
Year	Work	Award	Category	Result	Ref
2018	Eggshell Skull	Nib Literary Award	People's Choice	Won	
2019	Eggshell Skull	Australian Book Industry Awards	Biography of the Year	Won	
2019	Eggshell Skull	Australian Book Industry Awards	Matt Richell New Writer Award	Shortlisted	
2019	Eggshell Skull	CHASS Book Prize	—	Shortlisted	
2019	Eggshell Skull	Davitt Award	True Crime	Longlisted	
2019	Eggshell Skull	Davitt Award	Debut Crime Book	Won	
2019	Eggshell Skull	Indie Book Awards	Non-Fiction	Shortlisted	
2019	Eggshell Skull	Ned Kelly Awards	True Crime	Won	
2019	Eggshell Skull	Stella Prize	—	Longlisted	
2019	Eggshell Skull	Victorian Premier's Literary Awards	Nonfiction	Shortlisted	
2019	Eggshell Skull	Victorian Premier's Literary Awards	People's Choice Award	Shortlisted	
2021	Who Gets to Be Smart	Nib Literary Award	—	Longlisted	
2022	Who Gets to Be Smart	Australian Book Industry Awards	Non-Fiction	Longlisted	
2022	Who Gets to Be Smart	Indie Books Awards	Non-Fiction	Shortlisted	

== Works ==
=== Non-fiction ===
- Eggshell Skull (2018)
- Beauty (2019)
- Who Gets to Be Smart (2021)

=== Fiction ===
- The Work (2024)
- Seed (2025)
