= Chinese Fish =

2023 poetry collection by Grace Yee

- Author: Grace Yee
- Language: English
- Genre: Poetry collection
- Publisher: Giramondo Publishing
- Publication date: June 2023
- Publication place: Australia
- Media type: Print
- Pages: 144 pp.
- Awards: 2024 Victorian Premier's Literary Awards – Victorian Prize for Literature, winner
- ISBN: 9781922725448

Chinese Fish is a collection of poems by Australian poet Grace Yee, published by Giramondo Publishing in 2023.

The collection contains 7 poems, along with sections titled "translation", "Notes" and "Acknowledgments".

The collection won the 2024 Victorian Premier's Literary Awards – Victorian Prize for Poetry, and the Victorian Premier's Literary Awards – Victorian Prize for Literature.

== Synopsis ==
The collection tells an intergenerational story of the racism encountered by a migrant Chinese family in New Zealand from the 1960s to the 1980s.

The poems integrate hybrid Cantonese-Taishanese into English phrases.

== Contents ==
- "Happy Valley"
- "Paradise"
- "Good Luck and Plenty"
- "Chinese Fish"
- "English Mittens"
- "For the Good Husband"
- "Sunday Gardening"

== Critical reception ==
Writing for ArtsHub Elizabeth Walton noted that "Yee shifts both voices and forms in her wry autoethnographic poetry, offering a chronological map of her family as they slowly integrate into their chosen diaspora...The touch is always light, despite presenting the brutal reality of the family's lived experience." She concluded that the collection is "an essential read".

In her review for Cordite Poetry Review Jennifer Mackenzine called the book "one of the most elaborately structured collections of poetry I've come across in some time." She continued "It is a joyous celebration of the materiality of a life, of the chaotic sights and smells of a family life which is loud, disorganised, and adept at adapting its rituals to a society that is silent, organised, and judgemental."

== See also ==
- 2023 in Australian literature
