= The Shadow Girl =

Book by John Larkin

- First edition
- Author: John Larkin
- Language: English
- Genre: Young adult fiction
- Publisher: Random House Australia
- Publication date: October 1, 2011
- Publication place: Australia
- Media type: Print (hardcover, paperback)
- Pages: 336
- Awards: Victorian Premier's Award for young adult fiction
- ISBN: 9781864718751

The Shadow Girl is a 2011 novel by Australian author John Larkin. It was awarded the 2012 Victorian Premier's Award for young adult fiction.
