= Harvard Review =

Harvard University literary magazine

- Editor: Christina Thompson
- Categories: Literary magazine
- Frequency: Biannually
- Publisher: Houghton Library, Harvard University
- Founder: Stratis Haviaras
- Founded: 1986; 40 years ago
- Country: United States
- Language: English
- Website: harvardreview.org
- ISSN: 1077-2901
- OCLC: 60627281

Harvard Review is a biannual literary journal published by Houghton Library at Harvard University.

== History ==
In 1986 Stratis Haviaras, curator of the Woodberry Poetry Room at Harvard University, founded a quarterly periodical called Erato. The first issue featured a poem by Seamus Heaney, a short piece on Louis Simpson, a news item from Harvard University Press, and three pages of book reviews. Within three years the book review section of Erato had grown to more than 30 pages and the publication was renamed Harvard Book Review.

In 1992 Haviaras relaunched the publication as Harvard Review, a perfect-bound journal of approximately 200 pages, featuring poetry, fiction, and literary criticism, published semi-annually by the Harvard College Library. In 2000 Haviaras retired from Harvard University and Christina Thompson (formerly the editor of the Australian journal Meanjin) was appointed editor.

== Contributors ==
Contributors to Harvard Review have included John Ashbery, recipient of a National Book Award and a Pulitzer Prize for Poetry; Paul Harding, recipient of a Pulitzer Prize for Fiction; Jhumpa Lahiri, recipient of a Pulitzer Prize for Fiction; Rita Dove, winner of the Pulitzer Prize for Poetry; Charles Yu, winner of the National Book Award for Fiction; John Updike, recipient of a Pulitzer Prize for Fiction; Arthur Miller, recipient of a Pulitzer Prize for Drama; Joyce Carol Oates, recipient of a National Book Award for Fiction; Yusef Komunyakaa, winner of the Pulitzer Prize for Poetry; Jorie Graham, recipient of a Pulitzer Prize for Poetry; David Mamet, recipient of a Pulitzer Prize for Drama; David Foster Wallace; Gore Vidal; Andrea Barrett; and many other writers.

== Anthologies ==
Selections from Harvard Review have been anthologized in The PEN/O. Henry Prize Stories, The Best American Essays, The Best American Poetry, The Best American Short Stories, The Best American Mystery Sories, The Best American Nature and Science Writing, and The Pushcart Prize: Best of the Small Presses.

== Online ==
In 2009 Harvard Review launched an online edition of the journal.

== See also ==
- List of literary magazines
