= Christina Thompson =

Australian-American journal editor and author

Christina Thompson is best known for her book Sea People: The Puzzle of Polynesia, which won the 2020 Australian Prime Minister's Literary Award for Nonfiction.

== Career ==
Christina Thompson was born in Lausanne, Switzerland, and grew up outside of Boston. She received her bachelor's degree in English, Phi Beta Kappa, from Dartmouth College in 1981 and her Ph.D. in English from University of Melbourne in 1990. From 1994 to 1998 she was editor of Meanjin, one of Australia's leading literary journals.

The editor of Harvard Review since 2000, she teaches in the Writing Program at Harvard University Extension, where she was awarded the James E. Conway Teaching Writing Award in 2008.

Her first book, a memoir called Come on Shore and We Will Kill and Eat You All, was published in July 2008 by Bloomsbury USA. The story of the cultural collision between Westerners and the Māori of New Zealand, it was a finalist for the 2009 NSW Premier's Literary Award and the 2010 William Saroyan International Prize for Writing.

Her second book, Sea People: The Puzzle of Polynesia, is a history of Polynesian voyaging. Published March 12, 2019 by Harper, it won the 2020 Australian Prime Minister's Literary Award for Nonfiction, the 2020 Victorian Premier's Literary Award, and the 2019 New South Wales Premier's History Awards, and was a finalist for the 2020 Phi Beta Kappa Ralph Waldo Emerson Award, the 2019 Mountbatten Maritime Award, the 2019 Sigurd F. Olson Nature Writing Award and the 2019 Queensland Literary Award.

Her awards and fellowships include a Public Scholar Award from the National Endowment for the Humanities, a Literature Fellowship from the National Endowment for the Arts, and grants from Australia Council, Arts Victoria, the Institute of International Education, and the Australian Federation of University Women.

She is married to Tauwhitu Parangi, a member of the Ngāti Rēhia hapu of the Ngāpuhi iwi of Aotearoa/New Zealand, with whom she has three sons.

== Bibliography ==
=== Books ===
- Come on Shore and We Will Kill and Eat You All (2008, Bloomsbury)
- Sea People: The Puzzle of Polynesia (2019, Harper)

=== Articles ===
- "Skewing Male," Daily Scholar, Nov. 14, 2020
- “Some Kind of Kin,” Orion, Summer 2019, vol. 38, no. 2
- “Robert Louis Stevenson’s South Pacific Voyage,” BBC World Histories, 16, June/July 2019
- “The Ritual of Renewal,” Daily Scholar, Apr. 10, 2019
- “On Being an Outsider,” New York Times, Mar. 29, 2019
- “Down the Research Rat Hole,” JSTOR Daily, Dec. 20, 2018
- “Lay Your Sleeping Head, My Love,” Paris Review Daily, May 27, 2013
- "Prose Matters,” Essay Daily, Sep. 27, 2013
