= Hesitation (disambiguation) =

Hesitation is the psychological process of a pause in the course of making a decision or taking an action.

Hesitation or Hesitate may also refer to:

- The Hesitations, an American R'n'B group
- "Hesitation", a 1982 instrumental by Wynton Marsalis from Wynton Marsalis
- "Hesitation", a 2003 song by Stacie Orrico from Stacie Orrico
- Hesitation, a break in tempo at contract bridge
- "Hesitate (Stone Sour song)", a 2010 song by Stone Sour
- "Hesitate (Jonas Brothers song)", a 2019 song by Jonas Brothers

== See also ==
- Pause (disambiguation)
