= Victorian Premier's Literary Awards =

Literary prizes in Victoria, Australia

The Victorian Premier's Literary Awards were created by the Victorian Government with the aim of raising the profile of contemporary creative writing and Australia's publishing industry. As of 2013, it is reportedly Australia's richest literary prize with the top winner receiving A$125,000 and category winners A$25,000 each.

The awards were established in 1985 by John Cain, Premier of Victoria, to mark the centenary of the births of Vance and Nettie Palmer, two of Australia's best-known writers and critics who made significant contributions to Victorian and Australian literary culture.

From 1986 till 1997, the awards were presented as part of the Melbourne Writers Festival. In 1997 their administration was transferred to the State Library of Victoria. By 2004, the total prize money was A$180,000. In 2011, stewardship was taken over by the Wheeler Centre.

== Winners 2011–present ==
Beginning in 2011, the awards were restructured into five categories: Fiction, Nonfiction, Poetry, Drama and Young People's. The winner of each receives $25,000. Of those five winners, one is chosen as the overall winner of the Victorian Prize for Literature and receives an additional $100,000. There are two other categories with different prize amounts: an honorary People's Choice Award voted on by readers, and an Unpublished Manuscript Award with a prize amount of $15,000. In 2022 an Award for Children's Literature valued at $25,000 was added, with entries being accepted in 2023. Another category was added in 2024, the John Clarke Prize for Humour Writing, honouring satirist John Clarke, for fiction, nonfiction and poetry.

Shortlists are maintained in the main article for each category.

=== Victorian Prize for Literature ===
Year	Author	Title	Ref.
2011	Kim Scott	That Deadman Dance	
2012	Bill Gammage	The Biggest Estate on Earth	
2013	Presented in January 2014 (see 2014 entry) for books published in 2013. Previous awards were based on the year of publication.		
2014	Jennifer Maiden	Liquid Nitrogen	
2015	Alan Atkinson	The Europeans in Australia: Volume Three: Nation	
2016	Mary Anne Butler	Broken	
2017	Leah Purcell	The Drover's Wife	
2018	Sarah Krasnostein	The Trauma Cleaner: One Woman's Extraordinary Life in Death, Decay & Disaster	
2019	Behrouz Boochani	No Friend But the Mountains: Writing from Manus Prison	
2020	S. Shakthidharan with Eamon Flack	Counting and Cracking	
2021	Laura Jean McKay	The Animals in That Country	
2022	Veronica Gorrie	Black and Blue: A Memoir of Racism and Resilience	
2023	Jessica Au	Cold Enough for Snow	
2024	Grace Yee	Chinese Fish	
2025	Wanda Gibson	Three Dresses	
2026	Evelyn Araluen	The Rot	

=== Fiction ===
For winners from 1985 to 2010, see Vance Palmer Prize for Fiction.

Year	Author	Title	Ref.
2011	Kim Scott	That Deadman Dance	
2012	Gillian Mears	Foal's Bread	
2013	Presented in January 2014 (see 2014 entry) for books published in 2013. Previous awards were based on the year of publication.		
2014	Alex Miller	Coal Creek	
2015	Rohan Wilson	To Name Those Lost	
2016	Mireille Juchau	The World Without Us	
2017	Georgia Blain	Between a Wolf and a Dog	
2018	Melanie Cheng	Australia Day	
2019	Elise Valmorbida	The Madonna of the Mountains	
2020	Christos Tsiolkas	Damascus	
2021	Laura Jean McKay	The Animals in That Country	
2022	Melissa Manning	Smokehouse	
2023	Jessica Au	Cold Enough for Snow	
2024	Melissa Lucashenko	Edenglassie	
2025	Fiona McFarlane	Highway 13	
2026	Omar Musa	Fierceland	

=== Nonfiction ===
For winners from 1985 to 2010, see the Nettie Palmer Prize for Non-fiction.

Year	Author	Title	Ref.
2011	Mark McKenna	An Eye for Eternity: The Life Of Manning Clark	
2012	Bill Gammage	The Biggest Estate on Earth	
2013	Presented in January 2014 (see 2014 entry) for books published in 2013. Previous awards were based on the year of publication.		
2014	Henry Reynolds	Forgotten War	
2015	Alan Atkinson	The Europeans in Australia: Volume Three: Nation	
2016	Gerald Murnane	Something for the Pain	
2017	Madeline Gleeson	Offshore: Behind the Wire on Manus	
2018	Sarah Krasnostein	The Trauma Cleaner: One Woman's Extraordinary Life in Death, Decay & Disaster	
2019	Behrouz Boochani	No Friend But the Mountains: Writing from Manus Prison	
202o	Christina Thompson	Sea People: The Puzzle of Polynesia	
2021	Paddy Manning	Body Count: How Climate Change Is Killing Us	
2022	Amani Haydar	The Mother Wound	
2023	Eda Gunaydin	Root & Branch: Essays on Inheritance	
2024	Ellen van Neerven	Personal Score: Sport, Culture, Identity	
2025	Susan Hampton	Anything Can Happen	
2026	Micaela Sahhar	Find Me at the Jaffa Gate: An Encyclopaedia of a Palestinian Family	

=== Poetry ===
For winners from 1985 to 2010, see the C. J. Dennis Prize for Poetry.

Year	Author	Title	Ref.
2011	Cate Kennedy	The Taste of River Water	
2012	John Kinsella	Armour	
2013	Presented in January 2014 (see 2014 entry) for books published in 2013. Previous awards were based on the year of publication.		
2014	Jennifer Maiden	Liquid Nitrogen	
2015	Jill Jones	The Beautiful Anxiety	
2016	Alan Loney	Crankhandle	
2017	Maxine Beneba Clarke	Carrying the World	
2018	Bella Li	Argosy	
2019	Kate Lilley	Tilt	
2020	Charmaine Papertalk Green	Nganajungu Yagu	
2021	David Stavanger	Case Notes	
2022	Maria Takolander	Trigger Warning	
2023	Gavin Yuan Gao	At the Altar of Touch	
2024	Grace Yee	Chinese Fish	
2025	Jeanine Leane	Gawimarra: Gathering	
2026	Eunice Andrada	KONTRA	

=== Writing for Young Adults ===
For winners from 1985 to 2010, see the Victorian Premier's Prize for Young Adult Fiction.

Year	Author	Title	Ref.
2011	Cassandra Golds	The Three Loves of Persimmon	
2012	John Larkin	The Shadow Girl	
2013	Presented in January 2014 (see 2014 entry) for books published in 2013. Previous awards were based on the year of publication.		
2014	Barry Jonsberg	My Life as an Alphabet	
2015	Claire Zorn	The Protected	
2016	Marlee Jane Ward	Welcome to Orphancorp	
2017	Randa Abdel-Fattah	When Michael met Mina	
2018	Demet Divaroren	Living on Hope Street	
2019	Ambelin Kwaymullina and Ezekiel Kwaymullina	Catching Teller Crow	
2020	Helena Fox	How It Feels to Float	
2021	Cath Moore	Metal Fish, Falling Snow	
2022	Felicity Castagna	Girls in Boys' Cars	
2023	Kate Murray	We Who Hunt the Hollow	
2024	Lili Wilkinson	A Hunger of Thorns	
2025	Emma Lord	Anomaly	
2026	Margot McGovern	This Stays Between Us	

=== Drama ===
For winners from 1985 to 2010, see the Louis Esson Prize for Drama.

Year	Author	Title
2011	Patricia Cornelius	Do not go gentle…
2012	Lally Katz	A Golem Story
2013	Presented in January 2014 (see 2014 entry) for books published in 2013. Previous awards were based on the year of publication.	
2014	Patricia Cornelius	Savages
2015	Angus Cerini	Resplendence
2016	Mary Anne Butler	Broken
2017	Leah Purcell	The Drover's Wife
2018	Michele Lee	Rice
2019	Kendall Feaver	The Almighty Sometimes
2020	S. Shakthidharan with Eamon Flack	Counting and Cracking
2021	Angus Cerini	Wonnangatta
2022	Dylan Van Den Berg	Milk
2023	John Harvey	The Return
2024	S. Shakthidharan and Eamon Flack	The Jungle and the Sea
2025	Nathan Maynard	37
2026	Emilie Collyer	Super

=== People's Choice Award ===
Year	Author	Title	Ref.
2011	Anna Krien	Into The Woods: The Battle for Tasmania's Forests	
2012	Aidan Fennessy	National Interest	
2013	Presented in January 2014 (see 2014 entry) for books published in 2013. Previous awards were based on the year of publication.		
2014	Hannah Kent	Burial Rites	
2015	Tim Low	Where Song Began	
2016	Miles Allinson	Fever of Animals	
2017	Randa Abdel-Fattah	When Michael met Mina	
2018	Alison Evans	Ida	
2019	Bri Lee	Eggshell Skull	
2020	Chloe Higgins	The Girls	
2021	Louise Milligan	Witness	
2022	Rebecca Lim	Tiger Daughter	
2023	Karlie Noon and Krystal De Napoli	Astronomy: Sky Country	
2024	Antony Loewenstein	The Palestine Laboratory: How Israel Exports the Technology of Occupation Around the World	
2025	Robert Skinner	I'd Rather Not	
2026	Randa Abdel-Fattah	Discipline	

=== Unpublished Manuscript ===
For winners from 2003 to 2010, see the main article. No award was presented in 2011.

Year	Author	Title	Ref.
2012	Graeme Simsion	The Rosie Project	
2013	Maxine Beneba Clarke	Foreign Soil	
2014	Miles Allinson	Fever of Animals	
2015	Jane Harper	The Dry	
2016	Melanie Cheng	Australia Day	
2017	Christian White	The Nowhere Child (as Decay Theory)	
2019	Victoria Hannan	Kokomo	
2020	Rhett David	Hovering	
2021	André Dao	Anam	
2022	Keshe Chow	Fauna of Mirrors	
2023	Mick Cummins	One Divine Night	
2024	Rachel Morton	Panajachel	
2025	Chris Ames	I Made This Just for You	
2026	Charlotte Guest	The Kookaburra	

=== Indigenous Writing ===
Year	Author	Title	Ref.
2004	Vivienne Cleven	Her Sister's Eye	
2006	Tara June Winch	Swallow the Air	
2008	Yvette Holt	Anonymous Premonition	
2010	Larissa Behrendt	Legacy	
2012	Anita Heiss	Am I Black Enough For You?	
2014	Melissa Lucashenko	Mullumbimby	
2016	Tony Birch	Ghost River	
2019	Kim Scott	Taboo	
2021	Archie Roach	Tell Me Why: The Story of My Life and My Music	
2022	Veronica Gorrie	Black and Blue: A Memoir of Racism and Resilience	
2023	Lystra Rose	The Upwelling	
2024	Daniel Browning	Close to the Subject: Selected Works	
2025	Amy McQuire	Black Witness	
2026	Evelyn Araluen	The Rot	

=== Children's Literature ===
Year	Author	Title	Ref.
2024	Remy Lai	Ghost Book	
2025	Wanda Gibson	Three Dresses	
2026	Zeno Sworder	Once I Was a Giant	

=== John Clarke Prize for Humour Writing ===
Year	Author	Title	Ref.
2025	Robert Skinner	I'd Rather Not	

== Defunct award categories (1985–2010) ==
From 1985 to 2010 prizes were offered in some or all of the below categories.

- Vance Palmer Prize for Fiction
- Nettie Palmer Prize for Non-fiction
- Prize for Young Adult Fiction
- C. J. Dennis Prize for Poetry
- Louis Esson Prize for Drama
- Alfred Deakin Prize for an Essay Advancing Public Debate (after Alfred Deakin)
- Prize for Science Writing (biennial)
- Village Roadshow Prize for Screen Writing
- Grollo Ruzzene Foundation Prize for Writing about Italians in Australia
- John Curtin Prize for Journalism
- Prize for Best Music Theatre Script
- Prize for Indigenous Writing (Biennial)
- Prize for a First Book of History (Biennial)
- Dinny O'Hearn Prize for Literary Translation (Triennial)
- A.A. Phillips Prize for Australian Studies
- Alan Marshall Prize for Children's Literature
- Prize for First Fiction

== See also ==
- Victorian Community History Awards
- Wheeler Centre
