= Mariette Pathy Allen =

American photographer

- Born: 1940 (age 85–86); Alexandria, Egypt
- Education: Vassar College; University of Pennsylvania
- Occupation: Photographer
- Website: mariettepathyallen.com

Mariette Pathy Allen (born 1940) is a photographer and writer who focuses on the transgender, genderfluid, and intersex communities. She has published five books, Transformations: Cross-dressers and Those Who Love Them (1989), Masked Culture: The Greenwich Village Halloween Parade (1994), The Gender Frontier (2004), TransCuba (2014), and Transcendents: Spirit Mediums in Burma and Thailand (2017).

== Early life and education ==
Allen was born in Egypt to a wealthy Hungarian family who were involved in the shipping industry. Her first cousin once removed is Mark Pathy.

Allen graduated from Vassar College and then attended the Graduate School of Fine Arts at the University of Pennsylvania where she received an MFA in painting. She took a photography class off campus and switched her focus from painting to photography.

== Career ==
As a photographer, she photographed the transgender community for over 20 years.

In 1978, Allen was staying in the same hotel with a group of cross-dressers celebrating Mardi Gras and was inspired to begin photographing the intimate and often secretive lives of cross-dressers and transgender people. She developed into photojournalism and advocacy for the emergent transgender rights movement in the 1990s. She aims to photograph these communities in their everyday lives and capture their humanity with their families, in their careers, and in their homes.

Allen wrote Transformations: Crossdressers and Those Who Love Them in 1989. This book depicts the lives of heterosexual married men who cross-dress. She includes black and white portraits and interviews of her subjects.

In her second book The Gender Frontier (2003), Allen documents the transgender community through political movements and public demonstrations. In 2005, the book was awarded the Lambda Literary Award for Transgender Literature.

Allen has contributed her work to magazines, books, photography exhibitions, and documentaries. She was the photographer for Lee Grant's 1984 documentary What Sex Am I?, Rosa von Praunheim's Transexual Menace (1996), and Kate Davis's Southern Comfort (2001). Allen also took the cover photo of Jamison Green's Becoming a Visible Man. She was an associate producer for the A&E documentary The Transgender Revolution (1998). Her photography has been exhibited in the permanent collection at the Bibliothèque nationale de France, the Corcoran Gallery of Art, the Brooklyn Museum, Museum of Fine Arts Houston, and the New York Public Library. Allen is unofficially referred to as the "official photographer of the transgender community."

Allen's photographs and papers are archived at the Duke University Libraries Archive of Documentary Arts.
