= Pause (musician) =

- Also known as: PauseMC
- Born: Daniel Kushnir
- Origin: Milan, Italy, San Jose, California
- Genres: Hip hop
- Occupations: Singer, songwriter, record producer, rapper, musician
- Instruments: Piano, guitar, saxophone, flute, harmonica, vocals
- Years active: 2011–present
- Label: Fontana Distribution
- Website: pausemc.com

Daniel Zisette Kushnir (better known by his stage name Pause( is an American musician and rap artist. The multi-instrumentalist producer has risen to prominence in 2013 with placements on the Showtime series Ray Donovan (song: "Shouts Out") and Volition's 2013 release, Saints Row IV (soundtrack) (song: "Caroline").

== Origin of name ==
The name Pause was originally a nickname given to him by his father—an attempt to teach him to pause before engaging in destructive behaviour.

== Discography ==
Pacific Rose (Special Edition)

- Released: 9 July 2013
- Format: CD, digital download
- Label: Fontana Distribution
- Producer: Pause, LA Mike a.k.a. Double K (PUTS), Bird, Indy One, Mnemonic
- Singles: "Caroline"
