= Alison Evans (author) =

Australian novelist and writer

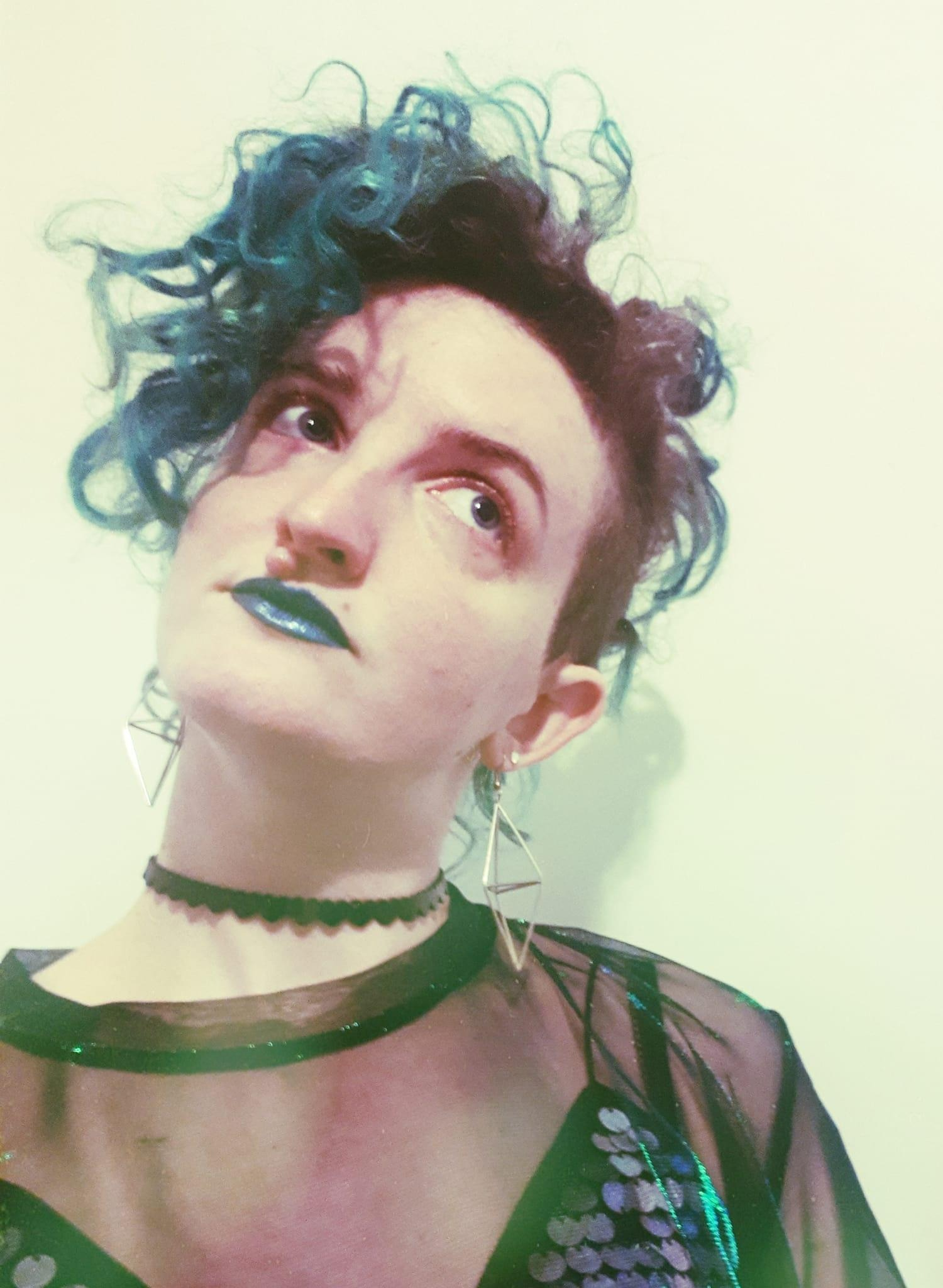
- Born: Melbourne, Victoria, Australia
- Occupations: Novelist and writer
- Website: www.alisonwritesthings.com

Alison Evans is an Australian novelist and writer. They are a transgender non-binary person who identifies as bisexual, and their work often features queer and transgender characters. Evans grew up in the town of Emerald among the Dandenong Ranges, a setting which went on to heavily influence their work.

Their first two novellas on Less Than Three Press were 2015's Long Macchiatos and Monsters and 2016's We Go Forward. Since 2017, they have published three young adult novels with Echo Publishing: Ida, Highway Bodies and Euphoria Kids. They won the Victorian Premier's Literary Award in the People's Choice category for Ida in 2018.

Evans has contributed short stories to various anthologies - including Kindred, Hometown Haunts and Everything Under the Moon - and works as both an author and editor of zines, including #EnbyLife with Rae White. They co-edited the 2024 Fremantle Press anthology Avast! Pirate Stories from Transgender Authors with Michael Earp, while also contributing the short story "CHANGELINGS". They have also written non-fiction articles for the ABC, Overland, The Guardian and The Saturday Paper.

In 2024, Evans was one of several authors at the centre of the State Library Victoria Teen Writing Bootcamp controversy in which a scheduled workshop for children was cancelled by the Library ostensibly due to the need for a "child and cultural safety review". Various Library staff made claims published in The Age and The Guardian that Evans and the other writers' support of Palestine was the actual reason and that the library had engaged in political censorship. These claims were later supported by the release of internal emails from the library.

== Bibliography ==
=== Novels ===
- Ida (2017) ISBN 1760404381, 978-1760404383
- Highway Bodies (2019) ISBN 176068502X, 978-1760685027
- Euphoria Kids (2020) ISBN 1760685852, 978-1760685850

=== Novellas ===
- Long Macchiatos and Monsters (2015) ASIN B00RJB6Q60ISBN 9781620044827
- We Go Forward (2016)ISBN 1620047268, 978-1620047262

=== Short stories ===
- "Weightless" (Cursive Scripts, 2010)
- "Watching Godot" (Verandah, issue 2016, 2011)
- "The Keepers" (Plunge volume 2, 2013)
- "Salt" (Wordly: Queer Edition, 2013)
- "Writer/Other" (Verandah, issue 29, 2014)
- "Oranges" (Wordly, 2014)
- "Wolfskin" (self-published zine, 2015)
- "Dandenongs Gothic" (Australian Gothic zine, 2015)
- "The Tiger is a Metaphor" (Slink Chunk Press, 2017)
- "Stormlines" (Kindred, 2019)
- "Sky Children" (Concrete Queers: Speculative Fiction, 2019)
- "Angel Eyes" (Hometown Haunts, 2021)
- "Moonfall" (Everything Under the Moon, 2023)
- "3 bedroom cozy $250/week move in ASAP" (Going Down Swinging issue 43, 2023)
- "CHANGELINGS" (Avast!: Pirate Stories from Transgender Authors, 2024)
- "It's probably fine" (Overland, 2024)
- "BREATHING IN AT THE SHOPPING CENTRE" (Bramble, 2024)
- "No One Knows That" (The Suburban Review, 2025)
