= Krystal De Napoli =

Australian astronomer

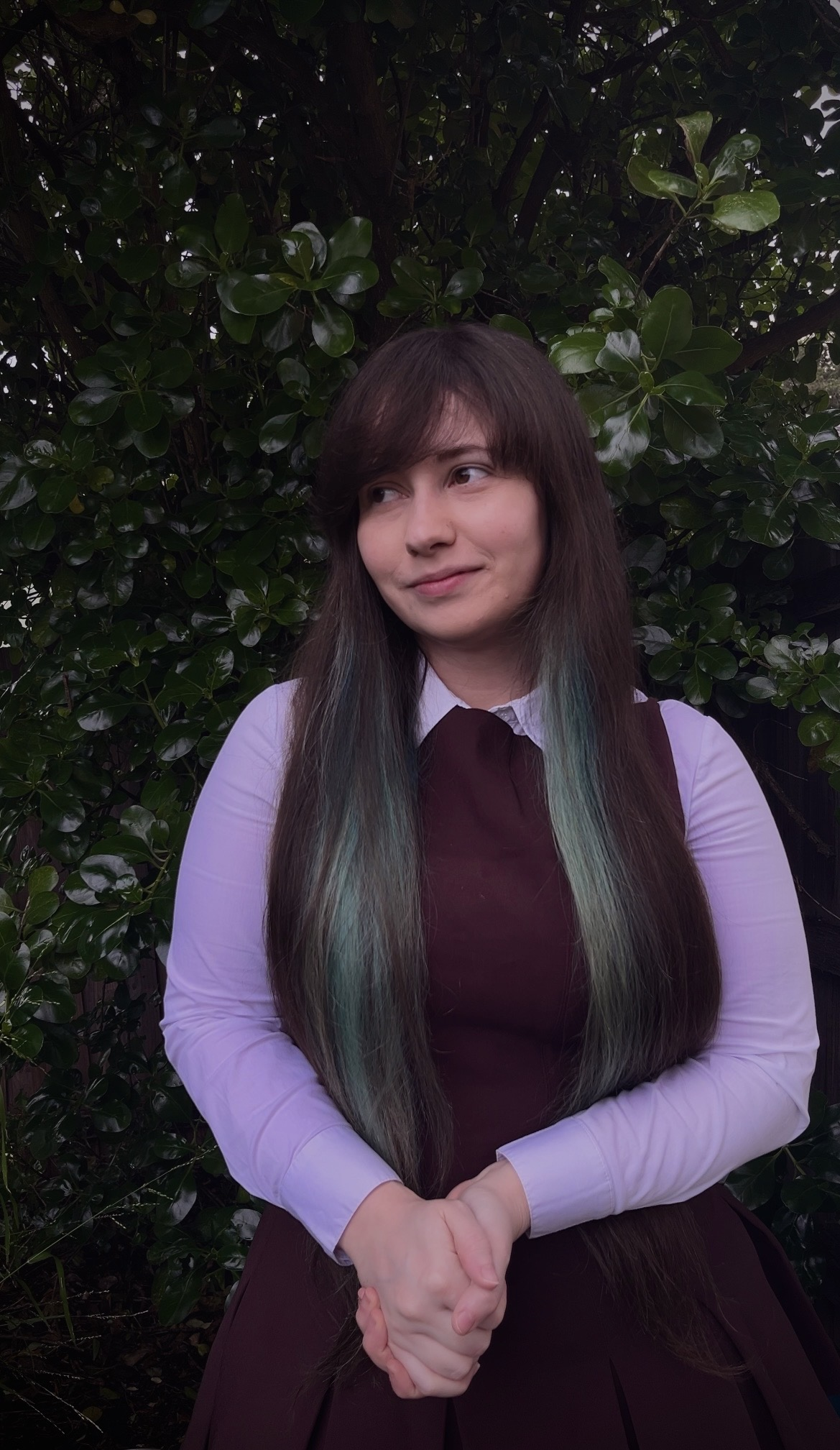
Krystal De Napoli

Krystal De Napoli is a Gomeroi woman and astrophysicist, a science communicator, and co-author of the 2022 First Knowledges' book Astronomy: Sky Country. De Napoli researches astronomy and astrophysics at Monash University.

== Early life ==
De Napoli was born on Bpangerang Country in Victoria, Australia, and grew up in the rural city of Wangaratta, where she says "sharing star stories and gazing upwards filled the sweetest moments of my childhood" and the clear night skies sparked her fascination for the stars.

De Napoli says although she "grew up knowing nothing about Indigenous science”, at she realised "there's a massive cross-section between Indigenous knowledges, and science in general". De Napoli says she now sees teaching Indigenous science as her contribution to reconciliation.

== Education and career ==
De Napoli obtained Bachelor of Science, majoring in astrophysics, from Monash University in 2020, and later obtained her honours in astrophysics in 2022, also from Monash University, where she researched star formation rates in galaxies.

During her time at Monash University, De Napoli received the Faculty of Science Science Communication Award in July 2020, and earned a commendation for Dean's Award for Innovation in Learning and Teaching in 2021.

Since 2019, De Napoli has worked for the Emerging Sciences Victoria program delivering astrophysics and mathematics content, and has been a Zoos Victoria educator at Healesville Sanctuary since 2024, delivering science education programs relating to Aboriginal cultures and the ways in which they are fighting the extinction of Healesville Sanctuary's 27 highlighted species.

== Awards, honours and recognition ==
- 2020 Monash University Faculty of Science Science Communication Award
- 2021 Out for Australia Young Professional of the Year Award
- 2021 Out for Australia 30 under 30 Award
- 2023 Victorian Premier's Literary Awards People's Choice Award for Astronomy: Sky Country
- 2023 Victorian Premier's Literary Awards Award for Indigenous Writing for Astronomy: Sky Country (shortlisted)
- 2023 The Best Australian Science Writing Dark Skies for Astronomy: Sky Country
- 2025 7NEWS Young Achiever Awards Indigenous Achievement Award
- 2025 Science & Technology Australia Superstars of STEM (2025–2026)

== Media and science communications ==
De Napoli is an experienced science communicator and educator. Outside of her professional work, De Napoli is a public speaker and has presented lectures at Swinburne University of Technology (2019 Swinburne Annual Reconciliation Lecture, "First Nations, First Astronomers"), the ICOMOS 21st General Assembly and Scientific Symposium (Heritage Lecture), the Royal Society of Victoria ("Australian Indigenous Astronomy: 65,000 Years of Science"), the Williamstown Literary Festival ("First Nations Astronomy"), and "Starfest 2024" (Bok lecture).

De Napoli has appeared on the Australian Broadcasting Corporation, Special Broadcasting Service, and has also featured in and co-produced the BBC radio documentary Emu in the Sky.

She also hosts the weekly radio show Indigenuity on Triple R 102.7FM, a weekly program showcasing Indigenous ingenuity, where she interviews Indigenous knowledge holders about their area of expertise.

== Publications ==
- Noon, Karlie; De Napoli, Krystal (2022). Astronomy: Sky Country. Thames & Hudson. ISBN 9781760762162.
