= Mary Anne Butler =

Australian playwright

Mary Anne Butler is an Australian playwright living in Darwin in the Northern Territory.

In 2016 she won the $100,000 Victorian Premier's Literary Awards for literature for her play Broken. It was the first time a script had won the award. Broken also won a Northern Territory Literary Award for best playscript in 2014.

In June 2014, Butler was awarded a Churchill Fellowship "to further develop contemporary playwrighting skills" in Dublin, Ireland.

== Bibliography ==
- 2009 – Half Way There
- 2010 – Dragons
- 2012 – Hopetown
- 2014 – Broken
- 2014 – Highway of Lost Hearts
- 2017 – God's Waiting Room
- 2018 – Cusp
- 2018 – One More Hour
- 2020 – Threshold
- 2023 – Wittenoom
