= The Pause (novel) =

Novel by John Larkin

- Author: John Larkin
- Language: English
- Genre: Young adult fiction, realistic fiction,
- Publisher: Random House Australia
- Publication place: Australia
- Media type: paperback
- Pages: 319
- ISBN: 9780857981707

The Pause is a 2015 novel by Australian author John Larkin. It looks deep at the devastating impact of teenage suicide, and how it affects the people around them. It is a personal narrative of its main character Declan O’Malley, describing his life following an attempted suicide after his love interest Lisa is forced to move to Hong Kong by her abusive mother.

The book won the 2015 Queensland Literary Award.

== Synopsis ==
The book is a first-person reflective narrative of the main character Declan O’Malley who commits suicide after his girlfriend Lisa is forcefully relocated to Hong Kong after their relationship is discovered by her mother referred to as the Kraken. He commits suicide via jumping onto the way of an oncoming train but is forced to observe an alternate reality where he survived his suicide attempt and recovered from depression.
