= Indigenous astronomy =

Astronomy by indigenous peoples

Indigenous astronomy is the name given to the use and study of astronomical subjects and their movements by indigenous groups. This field encompasses culture, traditional knowledge, and astronomy. Astronomy has been practiced by indigenous groups to create astronomical calendars which inform on weather, navigation, migration, agriculture, and ecology. Alongside calendric uses, constellations have names and stories that inform ceremony and social structures holding specific and deep cultural meanings for respective indigenous groups.

== Knowledge systems ==
Indigenous astronomy is an aspect of indigenous knowledge systems, which are used to explain and predict nature. It involves the notion of a living relationship with the sky, celestial objects and processes. This living relationship is a product of long-held observation and participation traditions, recognising the spirituality and relatedness of living things.

Research on the knowledge, traditions and practices from indigenous astronomy has revealed the scientific and social information they contain. European colonisation attempted to suppress indigenous cultures; however, many groups successfully persisted, maintaining their culture and inter-generational knowledge transmission. In some groups, information is considered sacred, or only shareable in specific seasons or by specific community members, ages, or genders. Therefore, sharing certain astronomical knowledge to non-indigenous may be inappropriate, and the astronomical information available is only that which is given freely by indigenous traditional owners to researchers.

== Examples from different regions ==
Indigenous astronomies are diverse in their specificities, but find commonality in some storytelling themes, practices, and functions.

In Aboriginal Astronomy, Kamilaroi and Euahlayi elders reveal that the Emu in the Sky, a dark constellation, informs on emu behaviour and seasonal changes, with consequences for food economics and ceremonial events.

Month	Position	Interpretation
April–May	Emu rises.	Chasing male emu to mate.
June–July	High in the sky, approximately horizontal to southern horizon.	Male sitting on the nest to incubate eggs (56–59 days). Used for estimations on collecting emu eggs.
August–September	Emu perpendicular to south-east horizon.	Male emu getting up from the nest as chicks hatch. Denotes when the Bora ceremony is held.
October–November	Low on the horizon. Galactic bulge visible.	The galactic bulge represents the emu's backside sitting in a watering hole, displacing water and drying out the land. This indicates the beginning of hot, dry summer months.

The August–September positioning denotes when the Bora ceremony is held. The Bora ceremonial grounds are thought to reflect the major dark patches of the emu (its head and body), as two circles of different sizes, connected by a pathway.

The use of stars for sea-navigation is common across indigenous groups, especially those with island or archipelago geographies. For example, the Bugis people of Indonesia used the presence or absence of certain stars and their rising and setting times like compass points, in concordance with other signs such as wave, wind and cloud patterns. For example, the absence of bembé' é, the goat (the Coalsack), forecast calm weather. Polynesian astronomy also utilised star-compasses like the Buganese, with the memorisation of specific "steering-stars" and their rising and setting directions on the horizon.

Astronomy was used across many cultures to develop lunar calendars. Polynesian groups and southern African tribes both used the heliacal rise of the Pleiades stars to regulate agricultural and ceremonial activities.

Northern Dene (Athabaskan) peoples in Alaska and north-western Canada read the Milky Way and adjacent star-groups as a single, whole-sky “Traveller” constellation. This massive figure, composed of named asterisms like “his heart” (27 Lyn), “his hands,” and “his trail” (the Milky Way), embodies a culture-hero known as the Traveller or Transformer. Discovering the heart-star is part of a vision-quest learning process that guides social protocols, spiritual power, and one’s relationship to land and cosmos; see Traveller constellations (Dene).

== Revitalisation and cultural heritage ==
Some academic literature argues that all science is embedded with culture, and to acknowledge this is integral to creating diverse learning environments and decolonising Western knowledge systems. To acknowledge other cultures is to affirm them, revealing valuable alternative scientific perspectives. This is considered important and a responsibility of institutions such as planetariums, museums, and educational curricula to include.

There are several initiatives to revitalise and share indigenous astronomy. In the US, the Bell Museum planetarium of Minnesota worked with native American astronomer, Annette Lee, to construct a best practices framework for sharing Indigenous Astronomy and create a live online programme on Indigenous Star Knowledge. Lee also received NASA funding to deliver a school educational programme on Indigenous Astronomy.

In Australia, Aboriginal Astronomy has featured in Sydney Observatory's exhibition since 1997. Research into the development of Aboriginal astronomical knowledge was used to develop an educational program at the Sydney Observatory, called Dreamtime Astronomy. It includes activities such as creating a planisphere with both Western scientific and Boorong names for celestial objects.

There is a perception that public education institutions uphold colonial narratives through their collections. To include and embrace Indigenous science in these institutions changes the way science is collected, stored, and shared and is therefore considered to help decolonise the Western scientific knowledge basis.

== Right to dark skies ==
The practice of observing space is currently threatened by increasing satellite traffic in the outer space environment. The crowding of Earth's orbit, particularly low-Earth orbit (LEO), by satellites poses a serious risk to practising astronomy due to satellite's visibility and disruption of the sky. Satellites are visible to the naked eye due to the reflection of sunlight. The proposed introduction of satellite mega-constellations, such as Starlink into LEO could disrupt Indigenous astronomical practices and the transmission of knowledge, heritage, and culture.

The Outer Space Treaty declares that outer space activity must occur in accordance with international law and for the benefit of all humankind. Protections for the rights of Indigenous cultures exist in varying degrees of strength. The right to practise and revitalise cultural traditions by Indigenous groups is protected by the United Nations Declaration on the Rights of Indigenous People (UNDRIP), which encompasses Indigenous astronomy, and their right to maintain their spiritual relationship with land. However, the UNDRIP does not specifically protect the spiritual relationship of Indigenous peoples with space, and as a non-legally binding instrument, it may not be able to prevent the damage to Indigenous astronomy by increased satellite use. However, the International Covenant on Civil and Political Rights is stronger legislation protecting Indigenous culture and may aid Indigenous communities in securing a right to dark skies. Progressive steps have been taken, such as the creation of 'VisorSat' by SpaceX to create less reflective and disruptive satellites, and the International Astronomical Union 2022 report on Quiet and Dark Skies raised the issue's profile and was presented at the United Nations Committee on the Peaceful Uses of Outer Space. Such steps could promote collaboration and the inclusion of Indigenous voices in the planning process for satellites in outer space.
