= Indigenous Australian literature =

Literature produced by Indigenous Australians

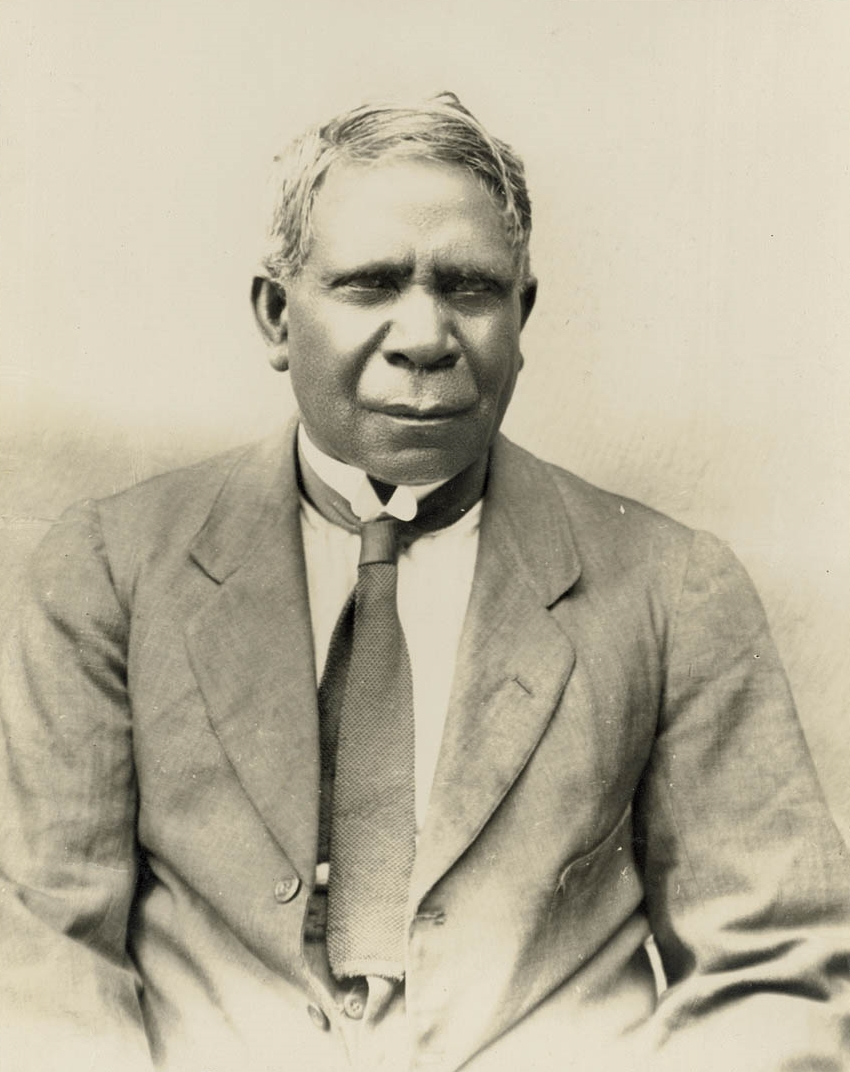
David Unaipon (1872-1967), the first Aboriginal author to be published

Indigenous Australian literature is the fiction, plays, poems, essays and other works authored by Aboriginal and Torres Strait Islander people of Australia.

While a letter written by Bennelong to Governor Arthur Phillip in 1796 is the first known work written in English by an Aboriginal person, David Unaipon was the first Aboriginal author to be published, in 1924–5. Since then, the number of published and recognised Indigenous authors has grown enormously; as of 2020, AustLit's BlackWords lists 23,481 works, and 6,949 authors and organisations. Nearly all are in English, as Indigenous Australians had not written their languages before the colonisation of Australia. Few works have thus far been written in Aboriginal Australian languages, but with recent efforts at language revival, this is expected to grow.

== History ==
Whether or not Indigenous Australian message sticks constitute writing is still a matter of scholarly debate. However, because message sticks are made of wood, which is extremely rarely preserved in the Australian climate, none from before colonisation have survived. Thus, the first literary accounts of Aboriginal people come from the journals of early European explorers, which contain descriptions of first contact.

A letter to Governor Arthur Phillip written by Bennelong in 1796 is the first known work written in English by an Aboriginal person.

While his father, James Unaipon (c.1835-1907), contributed to accounts of Ngarrindjeri mythology written by the missionary George Taplin in South Australia, David Unaipon (1872–1967) provided the first accounts of Aboriginal mythology written by an Aboriginal person, Legendary Tales of the Australian Aborigines (1924–5), and was the first Aboriginal author to be published.

The Yirrkala bark petitions of 1963 are the first traditional Aboriginal document recognised by the Australian Parliament.

Oodgeroo Noonuccal (1920–1993) was a famous Aboriginal poet, writer and rights activist credited with publishing the first Aboriginal book of verse: We Are Going (1964).

There was a flourishing of Aboriginal literature from the 1970s through to the 1990s, coinciding with a period of political advocacy and focus on Indigenous Australian land rights. Sally Morgan's 1987 memoir My Place brought Indigenous stories to wider notice. In the same year, Magabala Books, an Indigenous-owned enterprise, published its first book. In 1988, the David Unaipon Award was established by the University of Queensland Press, to reward and encourage new Aboriginal and Torres Strait Islander writers.

However a conservative backlash occurred under John Howard's government (1996 to 2007), causing a period of decline for Aboriginal publishing that was to last until the mid to late 2010s. Marcus Woolombi Waters wrote that frontier wars, starvation and occupation led to about a hundred million lives taken.

== Contemporary literature ==
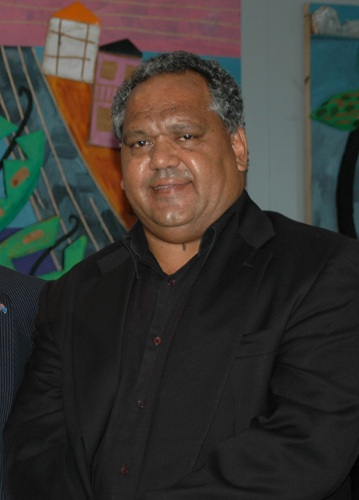
Noel Pearson, an Aboriginal lawyer, rights activist and essayist

Wiradjuri writer and academic Anita Heiss has edited a collection of Aboriginal literature that spans from 1796 until 2008, as well as a guide for Aboriginal and Torres Strait Islander writers.

Leading Aboriginal activists Marcia Langton (First Australians documentary TV series, 2008) and Noel Pearson (Up from the Mission, 2009) are contemporary contributors to Australian non-fiction. Other voices of Indigenous Australians include the playwright Jack Davis and Kevin Gilbert.

The First Nations Australia Writers Network was founded in 2013 with Kerry Reed-Gilbert as inaugural chair, to support and advocate for Indigenous writers. During the early 21st century, Heiss, Sandra Phillips and Jeanine Leane were important voices in promoting Aboriginal publishing.

Writers coming to prominence in the 21st century include Kim Scott, Alexis Wright, Kate Howarth, Tara June Winch, Yvette Holt and Anita Heiss. Indigenous authors who have won Australia's Miles Franklin Award include Kim Scott, who was joint winner (with Thea Astley) in 2000 for Benang and again in 2011 for That Deadman Dance. Alexis Wright won the award in 2007 for her novel Carpentaria. Melissa Lucashenko won the Miles Franklin Award in 2019 for her novel Too Much Lip.

Aboriginal and Torres Strait Islander women writers have also been well represented in the Stella Prize for writing by Australian women: the 2018 prize was awarded to Alexis Wright for her collective memoir, Tracker; and the shortlist has included Melissa Lucashenko’s Too Much Lip in 2019; Claire G. Coleman’s Terra Nullius in 2018; Ellen van Neerven’s Heat and Light in 2015; and Alexis Wright's The Swan Book in 2014.

== Poetry ==
Poets such as Evelyn Araluen, Ellen van Neerven and Alison Whittaker started rising to further prominence in 2020, after the George Floyd protests in Australia. Van Neerven's collection Throat won Book of the Year, the Kenneth Slessor Prize for Poetry and the Multicultural NSW Award at the NSW Premier's Literary Awards. Gunai poet Kirli Saunders cites van Neerven, Ali Cobby Eckermann and Oodgeroo Noonuccal as major influences in her work. Araluen's Dropbear won the 2022 Stella Prize.

== Online repositories ==
- AustLit's BlackWords project provides a comprehensive listing of Aboriginal and Torres Strait Islander writers and storytellers, past and present.
- The Living Archive of Aboriginal Languages contains works written in traditional languages of the Northern Territory.

== Notable authors ==
- David Unaipon
- Oodgeroo Noonuccal
- Sally Morgan
- Marcia Langton
- Melissa Lucashenko
- Herb Wharton
- Noel Pearson
- Jack Davis
- Kevin Gilbert
- Kim Scott
- Alexis Wright
- Kate Howarth
- Tara June Winch
- Yvette Holt
- Anita Heiss
- B. Wongar

== See also ==
- Australian literature
- List of Indigenous Australian writers
- Category:Indigenous Australian writers
- Contemporary Indigenous Australian art
- Indigenous music of Australia
- Tasmanian literature
- Tasmanian gothic
- Fijian literature
- Hawaiian literature
- New Zealand literature
- Papua New Guinean literature
- Samoan literature
- Tongan literature
- Indigenous literatures in Canada
- Native American literature
