= List of Indigenous Australian writers =

Numerous Indigenous Australians are notable for their contributions to Australian literature and journalism. Indigenous Australian literature includes fiction, plays, letters, essays and other works.

== Literature ==
- Faith Bandler – activist and novelist
- Larissa Behrendt – activist, lawyer and novelist
- Lisa Bellear – dramatist and poet
- Charmaine Bennell – children's fiction
- Iris Burgoyne – autobiographer
- Burnum Burnum – writer and educator, tireless proponent of reconciliation
- Ken Canning – poet and activist
- Mary Carmel Charles – children's fiction
- Claire G. Coleman – writer and poet
- Jack Davis – poet and playwright
- Wesley Enoch – playwright, director
- Lionel Fogarty – poet and activist
- Richard Frankland – playwright, scriptwriter and musician
- Kevin Gilbert – activist, writer, artist
- Jane Harrison – playwright
- Ruth Hegarty – writer
- Anita Heiss – novelist, poet and children's author
- Kate Howarth – writer, memoirist
- Marnie Kennedy – autobiographer
- Ruby Langford Ginibi – writer, historian, autobiographer
- Melissa Lucashenko – novelist
- Ray Mancini – writer, educator
- Philip McLaren – author, academic and artist
- Olga Miller – historian, artist and author
- Sally Morgan – writer
- Mudrooroo (Colin Johnson) – poet, author, playwright (note: Johnson's Aboriginality is contested by many)
- Big Bill Neidjie – last surviving speaker of the Gaagudju language
- Oodgeroo Noonuccal (Kath Walker) – poet
- Bruce Pascoe
- Doris Pilkington Garimara
- Kerry Reed-Gilbert (1956–2019) – activist, writer, artist, editor, educator
- Ronald Roe – writer
- Kim Scott – novelist
- Kirli Saunders – author and poet
- Jared Thomas – writer, and arts curator
- Margaret Tucker – activist and author of If Everyone Cared (1977), one of the first autobiographies of the Stolen Generations
- David Unaipon (1872–1967) – first published Aboriginal author
- James Unaipon (1835–1907) – author and preacher
- Ellen van Neerven – novelist and poet
- Sam Watson – novelist and filmmaker
- Samuel Wagan Watson – poet
- Herb Wharton – poet and novelist
- Tara June Winch – novelist
- Alexis Wright – Miles Franklin Award winning novelist

== Music and theatre ==
- Roger Bennett – playwright
- Wayne Blair – television writer, actor and director
- Jimmy Chi – composer, musician and playwright
- Richard Frankland – playwright, filmmaker, singer, songwriter
- David Page – composer, musician and playwright
- Stephen Page – film director, choreographer

== Journalism ==
- Dan Bourchier
- Miriam Corowa
- Jeremy Geia
- Freda Glynn
- Karla Grant – NITV anchor of Living Black
- Stan Grant
- John Newfong
- Rhianna Patrick
- Jack Patten

== Non-fiction ==
- Frances Bodkin
- Veronica Gorrie

== Essays and academia ==
- Chelsea Watego – academic and writer
