= Victorian Premier's Literary Award for Indigenous Writing =

Indigenous Australian literary award

The Victorian Premier's Prize for Indigenous Writing is a prize category in the annual Victorian Premier's Literary Award. The award commenced in 2004 and in 2012 the prize was valued at A$20,000. The winner of this category prize competes with the other category winners for overall Victorian Prize for Literature valued at an additional A$100,000. Nominees are allowed to enter other categories of the Victorian Premier's Literary Awards.

In 2004 Vivienne Cleven was the inaugural winner. The prize value was increased to A$25,000 in 2016.

== Winners and shortlists ==
Winners of the Overall Victorian Prize for Literature have a blue ribbon.

Victorian Premier's Literary Award for Indigenous Writing winners and finalists
Year	Author	Title	Result	Ref.
2004	Vivienne Cleven	Her Sister's Eye	Winner	
2004	Larissa Behrendt	Home	Finalist	
2004	Dennis McDermott	Dorothy's Skin	Finalist	
2006	Tara June Winch	Swallow the Air	Winner	
2006	Fabienne Bayet	Watershed	Finalist	
2006	Jared Thomas	Sweet Guy	Finalist	
2006	Noel C. Tovey	Little Black Bastard: A Story of Survival	Finalist	
2008	Yvette Holt	Anonymous Premonition	Winner	
2008	Gayle Kennedy	Me, Antman and Fleabag	Finalist	
2008	John Maynard	Fight for Liberty and Freedom: The Origins of Australian Aboriginal Activism	Finalist	
2010	Larissa Behrendt	Legacy	Winner	
2010	Kate Howarth	Ten Hail Marys: A Memoir	Finalist	
2010	Lorraine McGee-Sippel	Hey Mum, What's a Half-Caste?	Finalist	
2012	Anita Heiss	Am I Black Enough For You?	Winner	
2012	Jeanine Leane	Purple Threads	Finalist	
2012	Nicole Watson	The Boundary	Finalist	
2014	Melissa Lucashenko	Mullumbimby	Winner	
2014	Tony Birch	The Promise	Finalist	
2014	Lionel Fogarty	Mogwie-Idan: Stories of the Land	Finalist	
2014	Bruce Pascoe	Dark Emu	Finalist	
2014	Jared Thomas	Calypso Summer	Finalist	
2014	Alexis Wright	The Swan Book	Finalist	
2016	Tony Birch	Ghost River	Winner	
2016	Ali Cobby Eckermann	Inside My Mother	Finalist	
2016	Ellen van Neerven	Heat and Light	Finalist	
2019	Kim Scott	Taboo	Winner	
2019	Tony Birch	Common People	Finalist	
2019	Melissa Lucashenko	Too Much Lip	Finalist	
2019	Alison Whittaker	Blakwork	Finalist	
2021	Archie Roach	Tell Me Why: The story of my life and my music	Winner	
2021	Kirli Saunders	Kindred	Finalist	
2021	Nardi Simpson	Song of the Crocodile	Finalist	
2021	Karen Wyld	Where the Fruit Falls	Finalist	
2022	Veronica Gorrie	Black and Blue: A memoir of racism and resilience	Winner	
2022	Evelyn Araluen	Dropbear	Finalist	
2022	Gary Lonesborough	The Boy from the Mish	Finalist	
2022	S. J. Norman	Permafrost	Finalist	
2022	Elfie Shiosaki	Homecoming	Finalist	
2022	Chelsea Watego	Another Day in the Colony	Finalist	
2023	Lystra Rose	The Upwelling	Winner	
2023	Lionel Fogarty	Harvest Lingo	Finalist	
2023	Karlie Noon and Krystal De Napoli	Astronomy	Finalist	
2023	Amy Thunig	Tell Me Again	Finalist	
2024	Daniel Browning	Close to the Subject: Selected works	Finalist	
2024	John Morrissey	Firelight	Finalist	
2024	Ellen van Neerven	Personal Score: Sport, culture, identity	Finalist	
2025	Amy McQuire	Black Witness	Winner	
2025	Kirli Saunders	Afloat	Finalist	
2025	Gary Lonesborough	I'm Not Really Here	Finalist	
2025	Elfie Shiosaki	Refugia	Finalist	
2026	Evelyn Araluen	The Rot	Winner	
2026	J. M. Field	The Eagle & the Crow	Finalist	
2026	Natalie King and Iwantja Arts (eds)	The Art of Kaylene Whiskey: Do You Believe in Love	Finalist	
2026	Djon Mundine	Windows and Mirrors	Finalist	
