= Yvette Holt =

Australian Aboriginal poet (born 1971)

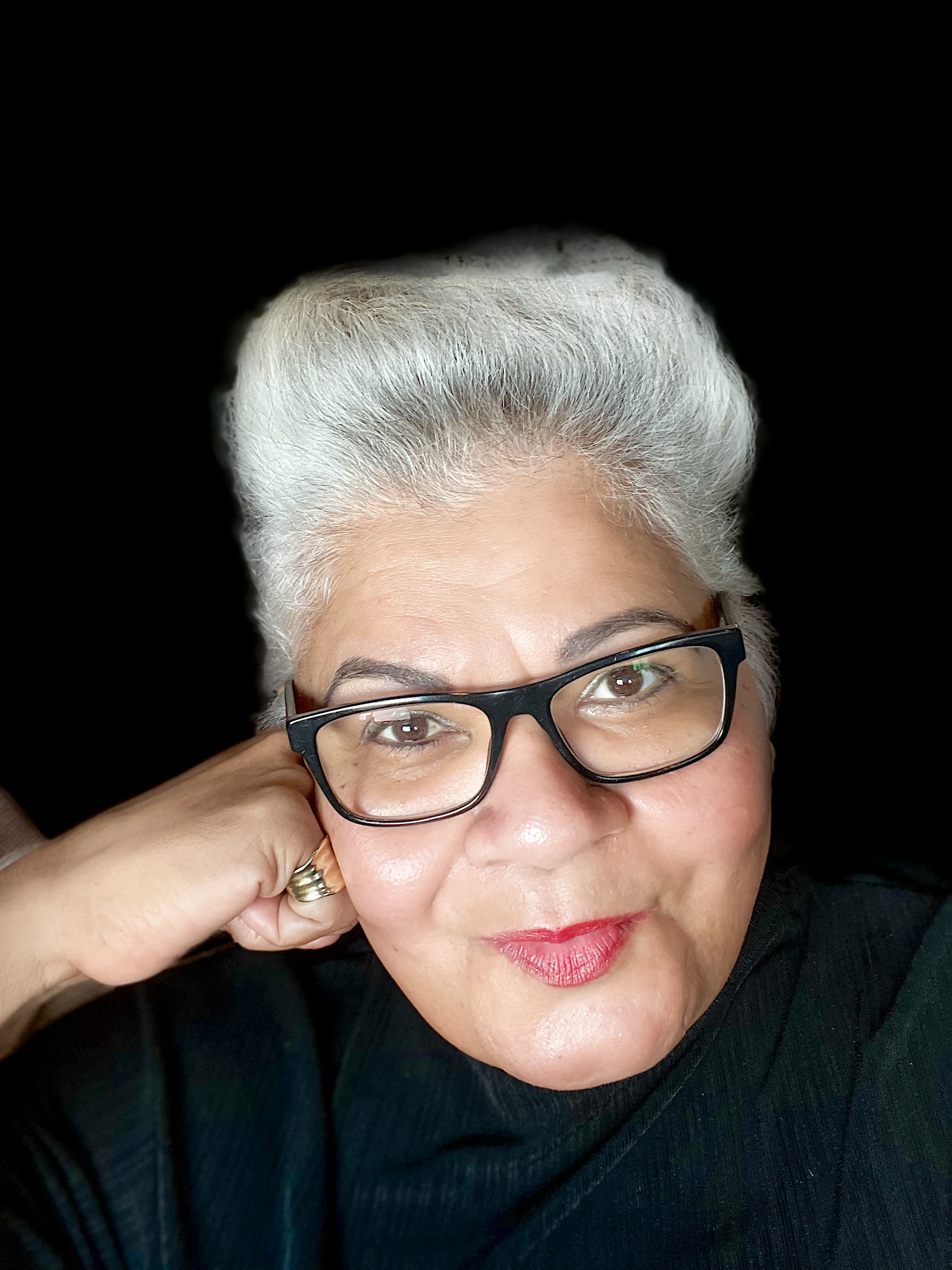
- Born: 31 January 1971 (age 55); Brisbane, Queensland Australia
- Education: University of Technology Sydney
- Occupations: Executive Chairperson First Nations Australia Writers Network, Poet, Editor, National Director of First Nations Australian Cultural Protocols — AP Australian Poetry
- Children: 1
- Relatives: Albert Holt (father); Lillian Holt (cousin)
- Writing career
- Years active: 2005–present
- Notable work: Anonymous Premonition Mother(s) Native Tongue
- Website: www.yvettehenryholt.com

Yvette Henry Holt (born 31 January 1971) is an Australian literary executive, contemporary Australian Aboriginal poet, essayist, researcher and editor. She heralds from the Bidjara, Yiman and Wakaman nations of Queensland. The youngest child born to prominent Queensland Elder, Albert Holt and Marlene (née Henry) Holt.

Holt came to poetic prominence with her first award-winning collection of poetry Anonymous Premonition in 2008. Between 2009-202, she lived and worked in Central Australia among the Central and Western Arrernte peoples of Hermansburg and Alice Springs.

== Early years and education ==
Holt was born in 1971 at the Royal Brisbane Women's Hospital. Her family lived in Inala East since 1968 where they had contributed to Queensland education in primary, secondary and tertiary, Queensland Police Service, community and social justice, Queensland Stolen Wages Class-Action, Brisbane Murri Court, Inala Elders, and the Southern Queensland Centre of Excellence in Aboriginal and Torres Strait Islander Primary Health Care. Yvette attended Serviceton Primary State School, now known as Durack State School, where she excelled at singing, softball and writing.

Holt graduated with a Bachelor of Arts in Adult Education and Community Management, at the University of Technology, Sydney UTS, Faculty of Business, 2007.

== Poetry ==
In 2008, Holt's first collection of poetry (for which she had won the David Unaipon Award in 2005), Anonymous Premonition, was published by the University of Queensland Press.

Her poems have since been published in multiple journals, anthologies, short-story essays online and in traditional publications, as well her poetry has been translated in multiple languages including Mandarin, French, Spanish, Indonesian, Italian and Dutch.

== Other work and activities ==
Between 2006-2009 Holt undertook research on Indigenous Australian literature, for the Black Words subset of AustLit, a resource for Australian literature published by the University of Queensland.

Holt has a keen interest in Indigenous social justice in particularly First Nations women and incarceration. Yvette speaks nationally and internationally on Black literature, Women of Colour in herstorical and cultural poetic spaces, publishing, and Indigenous First Nations creative writing. Holt continues to mentor youth and women's circles on creative writing and Indigenous Australian literature.

In 2009 Yvette moved to Central Australia living and working across eighteen remote Aboriginal communities from 2009-2018 in areas such as health literacy, financial literacy, Indigenous employment strategies, and lecturer and Course Coordinator of Creative Writing at the Batchelor Institute of Indigenous Tertiary Education, Alice Springs Campus.

== Current roles ==
Holt is currently the Executive Chairperson for the First Nations Australia Writers Network FNAWN since 2018, she is also a Board Director and First Nations National Director for Literary Cultural Protocol & Ethics to AP Australian Poetry 2019 – current, the peak-industry body for Australasian poetry, located at The Wheeler Centre, Melbourne.

Holt oversees publications between First Nations Australian writers, poets, storytellers, editors and leads the Global Alliance Network to the First Nations Australia Writers Network FNAWN.

Editor, Holt co-edited the 2019 AP Anthology Volume 7.

Co-editor for the Borderless: A transnational anthology of feminist poetry 2021, published by Recent Work Press.

In recent years Yvette Henry Holt has advocated strongly toward the push for a nationally recognised Poet Laureate to the Commonwealth of Australia.

== Recognition and awards ==
- 2003: UTS Human Rights Award in the category of Reconciliation for "Outstanding contribution towards the elevation of social justice for Indigenous Australians"
- 2005: David Unaipon Award (in the Queensland Premier's Literary Awards) for an unpublished Indigenous Australian author, for Anonymous Premonition
- Other prizes for Anonymous Premonition after publication:
  - 2008: Scanlon Prize for Indigenous Poetry
  - 2008: Victorian Premier's Literary Award for Indigenous Writing
  - 2010: Kate Challis RAKA Award
- 2018: "Mother(s) Native Tongue", Highly Commended in the 2018 Oodgeroo Noonuccal Indigenous Poetry Prize
- 2019: Recipient, Varuna Fellowship for her poetry manuscript "Hands of My Mother"
- 2019: Recipient, Neilma Sidney Literary Travel Fund
- In 2019, Holt received one of three Norma Redpath Studio residencies, one of three awarded as part of that year's Hot Desk Fellowships awarded by the Wheeler Centre.
