= Rebecca Giggs =

Australian writer

Rebecca Giggs is a London-based Australian nonfiction writer, known for Fathoms: The World in the Whale.

== Life and Career ==
Giggs was born in the UK and moved to Western Australia at an early age. She studied at the University of Western Australia. She holds an LLB, BA Arts (Hons) and a PhD in ecological literary studies conferred in 2014.

Giggs is an honorary fellow at the Macquarie University in Sydney. She was awarded the 2017 Mick Dark flagship fellowship by Varuna for "The Whale in the Room", the working title for Fathoms. She won support from Writers Victoria through the Neilma Sidney Literary Travel Fund to visit the Rachel Carson Centre for Environment and Society in Munich, Germany as a writing fellow in 2018.

As an essayist, Giggs has contributed to The Atlantic on science subjects from "Why We're Afraid of Bats" to "Human Drugs Are Polluting the Water—And Animals Are Swimming in It".

Her first book, Fathoms: The World in the Whale, was published in 2020 worldwide by Scribe and by Simon & Schuster in the USA.

== Awards and recognition ==
Kirkus Reviews named Fathoms in their "10 Top Summer Reads in Nonfiction" and described the book as "a thoughtful, ambitiously crafted appeal for the preservation of marine mammals". In November 2020 Giggs won the Nib Literary Award and in February 2021 she won the Andrew Carnegie Medal for Excellence in Nonfiction for Fathoms. In 2021, Fathoms was shortlisted for the Wainwright Prize, alongside David Attenborough's A Life on Our Planet and others, in the Global Conservation Writing category.

| Year | Title | Award | Category | Result | Ref. |
|---|---|---|---|---|---|
| 2020 | Fathoms | Kirkus Prize | Nonfiction | Finalist | |
| 2020 | Fathoms | Nib Literary Award | — | Won | |
| 2020 | Fathoms | Western Australian Premier's Book Awards | Emerging Writer | Won | |
| 2021 | Fathoms | Andrew Carnegie Medals for Excellence | Nonfiction | Won | |
| 2021 | Fathoms | PEN/E. O. Wilson Literary Science Writing Award | — | Shortlisted | |
| 2021 | Fathoms | Stella Prize | — | Shortlisted | |
| 2021 | Fathoms | Wainwright Prize | Global Conservation | Shortlisted | |
| 2021 | "Soundings" | Bragg UNSW Press Prize for Science Writing | — | Shortlisted | |

== Bibliography ==
=== Books ===
- —— (2020). Fathoms: The World in the Whale. New York: Simon & Schuster. ISBN 9781982120696.

=== Reviews ===
- "What Lies Beneath" – review of Underland by Robert Macfarlane, The Atlantic, July 2019
- "The Lost World" – review of Otherlands: A Journey Through Earth’s Extinct Worlds by Thomas Halliday, The New York Review of Books, 21 December 2023
