= First Nations Australia Writers Network =

Peak body for Indigenous Australian writers

The First Nations Australia Writers Network (FNAWN) is the peak advocacy body for Aboriginal and/or Torres Strait Islander writers, storytellers and poets in Australia.

== History ==
The seeds for the organisation were sown at the Guwanyi Indigenous Writers Festival in March 2011, although the idea had been discussed much earlier, at a 1993 writers' workshop in Brisbane by Anita Heiss, Jared Thomas, and Kerry Reed-Gilbert. In 2012, a working party established to work towards the goal, comprising Thomas, Reed-Gilbert, Philip McLaren, Jackie Huggins, Sam Watson Snr, Jim Everett (a.k.a. puralia meenamatta, Tasmanian writer, playwright, and poet), Alexis West (dancer, choreographer, performer, writer, filmmaker), John Harding (playwright), Peter Minter (poet and editor), Marcus Waters (Kamilaroi screenwriter and academic, and Marie Munkara (Darwin-based writer of Rembarrnga and Tiwi descent).

First Nations Australia Writers Network was established in 2013, with Reed-Gilbert as the first chair. Cathy Craigie was a co-founder and became executive director of the organisation.

== Description ==
FNAWN serves as an advocacy body and resources service for emerging and established Indigenous Australian writers, poets and storytellers, helping to develop skills and provide development opportunities, "to sustain and enhance First Nations Australians writing and storytelling".

It is registered as a charitable organisation based in Canberra, with all of its funding coming from government grants.

As of 2021, Jackie Huggins is patron and poet Yvette Holt is chair. Board members are Jeanine Leane, Samantha Faulkner, John Harding, Ali Cobby Eckermann and Rachel Bin Salleh.

== Activities and events ==
In May 2013, FNAWN organised its first national workshop, a three-day-event in Brisbane attended by 120 Indigenous writers, poets and storytellers, as well as non-Indigenous literary, agents, publishers and individuals. The second workshop, held in Melbourne in 2015, was an opportunity to demonstrate the work of its members and the success of the organisation, both within Australia and internationally. A third workshop was held in Canberra in August 2018.

FNAWN was one of the main organisers of the first trip by Aboriginal writers to the US, to attend a book fair to showcase their work. It has hosted guests from Canada, New Zealand and the US at various events.

In 2014, the FNAWN worked with Australian Poetry on the management of the Scanlon Prize for Indigenous Poetry.

In September 2015, in a collaboration with Poets House in New York, a recording of six FNAWN members reading their work was presented at a special event, and recorded for posterity. Introduced by Craigie, the six readers were: Jeanine Leane, Dub Leffler, Melissa Lucashenko, Bruce Pascoe, Jared Thomas and Ellen van Neerven.

Submissions consisting of poems of up to 40 lines for a volume entitled FN COVID-19 Anthology 2021 closed in December 2020. The project is overseen by FNAWN publisher, Yvette Holt, in association with Australian Poetry, and funded by the Australia Council for the Arts.
