= Edenglassie (novel) =

2023 novel by Australian author Melissa Lucashenko

- Author: Melissa Lucashenko
- Language: English
- Genre: Novel
- Publisher: University of Queensland Press
- Publication date: 3 October 2023
- Publication place: Australia
- Media type: Print
- Pages: 320 pp.
- Awards: 2024 ARA Historical Novel Prize, 2024 Victorian Premier's Literary Award
- ISBN: 9780702266126
- Preceded by: Too Much Lip
- Followed by: -

Edenglassie is a 2023 novel by the Australian author Melissa Lucashenko.

== Synopsis ==
The novel is set in Queensland in the short period of time between when the transportation of convicts ended, and Queensland became an independent colony in 1859, and also in the present day. In the 21st century, after she has tripped over a tree root and finds herself in hospital, Granny Eddie talks to a white journalist and tells him that the whitefella-concocted history of the land is wrong, that she has the true story from the Old People.

== Critical reception ==
Writing in Australian Book Review, critic Jeanine Leane noted that the novel "moves in a great concentric arc with many ripples, like those in the river that is central to the action; and which is an ancient, unbroken vein that pulses life from past to present to future in a continuous cycle." She went on to say that the novel "is an accumulation of all times – a testimony to the continuation of Aboriginal storytelling, value systems, intellectualism, scientific and technological literacy, and understandings of time, non-human agency, and Country."

In The Newtown Review of Books Michael Jongen called it "an ambitious novel" and "an astounding read".

== Publishing history ==
After the novel's initial publication in Australia by University of Queensland Press in 2023, it was reprinted by the same publisher in 2024.

== Awards ==
- 2024 ARA Historical Novel Prize, winner
- 2024 Australian Book Industry Awards, Small Publishers' Adult Book of the Year, winner
- 2024 Barbara Jefferis Award, shortlisted|
- 2024 Indie Book Awards Fiction, winner
- 2024 Miles Franklin Award, longlisted}
- 2024 Nib Literary Award, shortlisted
- 2024 Prime Minister's Literary Awards, Fiction, shortlisted
- 2024 Queensland Literary Awards, Queensland Premier's Award, winner
- 2024 Queensland Literary Awards, Fiction Book Award, shortlisted
- 2024 Stella Prize, longlisted
- 2024 Victorian Premier's Literary Award, Fiction, winner
- 2025 New South Wales Premier's Literary Awards, Christina Stead Prize for Fiction, shortlisted
- 2026 Walter Scott Prize, longlisted

== See also ==
- 2023 in Australian literature

== Notes ==
- Epigraph: 'You fool', she said, 'this is England.'/'I don't believe it,' I said, 'and I will never believe it.' - Jean Rhys, Wide Sargasso Sea
- The author spoke to Susan Chenery of The Guardian about her experience writing the book
