= Purple Threads =

Short story collection by Jeanine Leane

- First edition
- Author: Jeanine Leane
- Language: English
- Genre: Short story collection, Historical fiction
- Published: 2011 (University of Queensland Press)
- Publication place: Australia
- Media type: Print (paperback)
- Pages: 157
- ISBN: 9780702238956
- OCLC: 703219318

Purple Threads is a 2011 short story collection by Australian author Jeanine Leane. Based on Leane's childhood, the stories are about Sunny, a Wiradjuri girl, growing up in the Gundagai district during the 1960s and 1970s.

== Contents ==
- Women and Dogs in a Working Man's Paradise
- God's flock
- Waiting for Petal
- Lilies of the Field
- Coming Home
- Marching with Hannibal
- Purple Threads
- Lying Dogs
- Land Grab
- The National Sheep Dip Alliance Party
- Epilogue – Country Turns

== Reception ==
Anita Heiss, writing in Meanjin, " — fell in love with the story of strong capable women living without fear on the land, protecting their home and kin, saving young dying farm animals —while offering readers pearls of wisdom told in their own bush English."

Purple Threads has also been reviewed by mETAphor, Reviews in Australian Studies, and Outskirts.

== Awards and nominations ==
- 2010 David Unaipon Award winner.
- 2012 Victorian Premier's Literary Award for Indigenous Writing shortlist.
- 2012 Commonwealth Book Prize shortlist.
