= Jared Thomas =

Australian writer (born 1976)

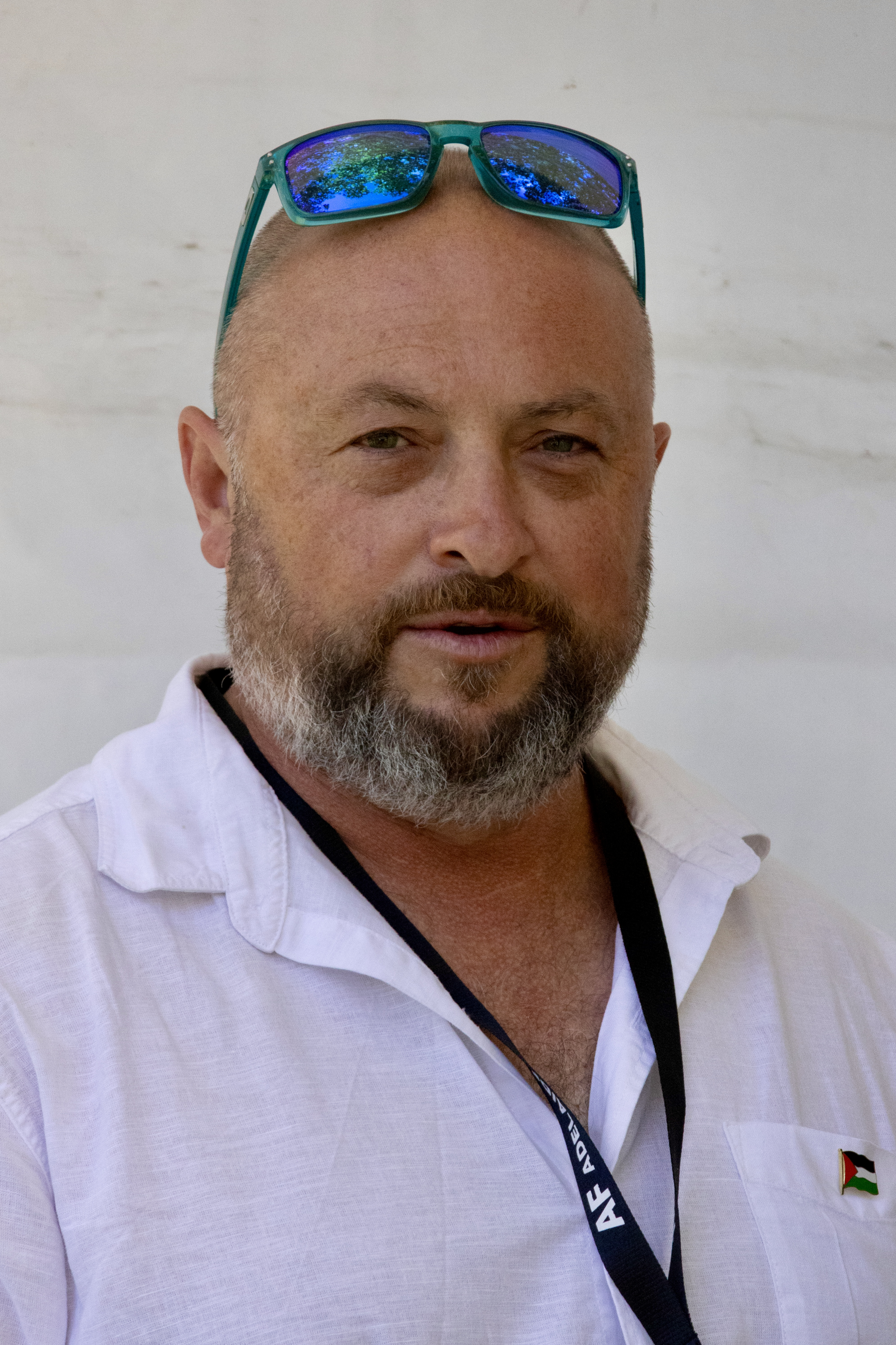
- Thomas in 2025
- Born: 1976 (age 49–50); Port Augusta, South Australia
- Occupations: Writer, researcher
- Writing career
- Genres: Young adult fiction, children's fiction, plays, poetry

Jared Thomas (born 1976) is an Australian author of children's fiction, playwright, and museum curator. Several of his books have been shortlisted for awards, and he has been awarded several fellowships, including a Churchill Fellowship in 2019. As of November 2024 Thomas is a research fellow for Indigenous culture and art at the South Australian Museum and the University of South Australia.

== Early life and education ==
Thomas was born in Port Augusta in 1976, of Aboriginal, Scottish, and Irish heritage. He is a Nukunu man, born on Nukunu land in the Southern Flinders Ranges and raised within the Nukunu culture.

He was inspired by seeing the play Funerals and Circuses by Arrernte playwright Roger Bennett when on a school excursion to the Adelaide Fringe Festival in 1992 and decided to study the humanities and writing. After excelling in his undergraduate BA degree at the University of Adelaide (1996), he worked for the Fringe for a while before gaining a traineeship to work as an editor of a publication at the Tandanya National Aboriginal Cultural Institute, where he developed a love of visual arts.

He later completed an MA in creative writing at the University of Adelaide, and earned a PhD in creative writing at the University of South Australia (UniSA) in 2011.

== Career ==
Working at the University of Adelaide as an academic advisor, he enrolled for a master's degree in creative writing and wrote plays. His work Love, Land and Money was later produced for the 2002 Adelaide Fringe. After having poems and short stories published in several anthologies, he started focusing on novels, and his first novel, Sweet Guy (2005) was shortlisted in the Victorian Premier's Literary Awards in 2006 and the Adelaide Festival Awards for Literature.

As lecturer of Communication and Literature at UniSA's David Unaipon College of Indigenous Education and Research, Thomas enrolled for his PhD in creative writing, which he completed in 2011.

Thomas was a member of the working party involved in the creation of the First Nations Australia Writers Network (FNAWN) in 2012. In September 2015, in a collaboration with Poets House in New York City, Thomas participated in a recording of six FNAWN members reading their work at a special event, which was recorded. The other readers were Jeanine Leane, Dub Leffler, Melissa Lucashenko, Bruce Pascoe, and Ellen van Neerven.

He has coordinated Nukunu People's Council cultural heritage, language, and arts projects. He was Arts Development Officer, Aboriginal and Torres Strait Islander Arts at Arts SA in 2018, and as of 2019 is an ambassador for the Indigenous Literacy Foundation.

In May 2018, Thomas began a 12-month secondment as William and Margaret Geary Curator of Aboriginal and Torres Strait Islander Art and Material Culture at the South Australian Museum. In this role he curated the Yurtu Ardla exhibition from March to June 2019.

In September 2019, he was awarded a Churchill Fellowship to travel to New Zealand, the US, Canada, and Norway, "to investigate colonised people's interpretative strategies in permanent gallery displays".

In 2020, Thomas was employed as Indigenous consultant on two ABC TV series, Stateless and Operation Buffalo.

In September 2024, he was appointed a member of First Nations Arts, a newly-established division of the government arts funding body Australia Council focused on Aboriginal and Torres Strait Islander arts, for a term of four years.

As of November 2024, Thomas is a research fellow for Indigenous culture and art at the South Australian Museum and the University of South Australia.

== Awards ==
- Sweet Guy — 2002, shortlisted, Adelaide Festival Awards for Literature (SA): Award for an Unpublished Manuscript; 2006, shortlisted, Victorian Premier's Literary Awards: Prize for Indigenous Writing
- Calypso Summer — 2013 winner, black&write! Indigenous Writing Fellowships; 2014 — shortlisted, Victorian Premier's Literary Award for Indigenous Writing; winner, International White Raven award in 2015, selected by the International Youth Library in Munich, Germany, "given to books that deserve worldwide attention because of their universal themes and/or their exceptional and often innovative artistic and literary style and design".
- Patty Hits the Court: Game Day! — 2018, shortlisted, Speech Pathology Australia Book of the Year Awards: Best Book for Language Development, Indigenous Children
- Uncle Xbox (Book 2) Getting Dusty — 2023 winner, Daisy Utemorrah Award for Unpublished Indigenous Junior and Young Adult Fiction, Western Australian Premier's Book Awards
- My Spare Heart — 2023 shortlisted, Young Adult Book Award, Queensland Literary Awards

== Works ==
=== Novels ===
- Thomas, J. (2005). Sweet Guy. IAD Press. ISBN 978-1-86465-050-1.
- —— (2011). Dallas Davis: The Scientist and the City Kids. Oxford University Press. ISBN 978-0-19-557258-2.
- —— (2013). Calypso Summer. Magabala Books. ISBN 978-1-922142-12-2.
- —— (2016). Songs that Sound like Blood. Magabala Books. ISBN 978-0-19-557258-2.
- ——; Patty Mills (2018). Game Day! Championship Collection. Allen & Unwin. ISBN 978-1-76052-380-0. (Contents: 1. Game Day – Patty Hits the Court; 2. Game Day – Patty and the Shadows; 3. Game Day – Patty Takes Charge)
- —— (2022). My Spare Heart. Allen & Unwin. ISBN 978-1-76063-183-3.

=== Plays ===
- Love, Land and Money (2002)
- Flash Red Ford (1999) - toured Uganda and Kenya, performed by a Ugandan company.

=== Non-fiction ===
- "Daredevil Days", chapter in Growing Up Aboriginal in Australia. Black Inc. 2018. ISBN 9781863959810
