= Australian Poetry =

Australian organisation representing poets nationally

Australian Poetry is a national not-for-profit organisation representing Australian poets, based at The Wheeler Centre in Melbourne. The organisation was created in 2011 by the amalgamation of Poets Union Inc., based in New South Wales, and the Australian Poetry Centre Inc. of Victoria.

The Poets Union of Australia was originally established in 1977. Branches went on to be established nationally. The Australian Poetry Centre was launched in 2007, based on the work of the earlier (founded 2002) organisation called the Poetry Australia Foundation.

Australian Poetry publishes the Australian Poetry Journal and the Australian Poetry Anthology.

== History ==
=== Melbourne Poets Union ===
The Melbourne Poets Union (MPU) was established in 1977, but later incorporated in New South Wales, with branches nationally.

There was a national body, the Poets Union of Australia, from 1978. This body was based in Footscray, Victoria, and published a newsletter called the Poets Union News. During this time, the Sydney/NSW branch of the Union held readings in pubs in Sydney, such as one at the Royal Standard Hotel at which Michael Wilding was one of the readers.

Lee Cataldi, Anna Couani (President of the Sydney branch), Rae Desmond Jones, Kate Llewellyn, Alan Wearne, Les Wicks, Chris Mansell and Judith Wright and many other Australian writers were associated with the Poets' Union.

One source gives 1980 as the end date of the national body (possibly in some states?), stating that after this date, state organisations took over its functions. However the South Australian branch, known as the South Australian Poets' Union, or S.A. Poets' Union, existed until 1987: "The S.A. Poets' Union was established to serve the needs of Friendly Street at first, but the organisation ceased in 1987". K. F. Pearson was Secretary for two and a half years, from 1979 until 1982. The organisation was wound up in November 1987.

=== Poets Union (NSW) ===
The Poets Union was also referred to as the Poets Union of New South Wales. Over its lifetime, its publications included:

- Newsletters of the Sydney Branch of the Poets Union;
- Muse News: The Monthly Newsletter of the Poets Union NSW (1984–1993);
- OzMuze (Vol. 1 no. 1, October 1990 – Vol. 2 no. 4, April 1992);
- Five Bells, a quarterly journal (named after the poem by Australian poet Kenneth Slessor) from 1993/4 to 2010;
- A biennial anthology of members' poems; and
- Two and a Half Bells, a newsletter.

=== Poets' Union Inc ===
From 1998 the Poets Union officially became a national body, the Poets' Union Inc.

From 1999 the Poets Union held regular poetry readings at the Brett Whiteley Studio in Sydney, after a one-off held there in 1998. Brook Emery, former President of the Poets Union, coordinated the readings at the Studio until 2008, when Angela Stretch started serving in the new position of curator and coordinator.

As of 2008 most of the members were based in New South Wales (391), but there were 74 Victorian members and a spread of members through the other states and the Northern Territory. It held the biennial National Poetry Festival (aka Australian Poetry Festival) in cities across Australia; in 2008, panels were stated concurrently in Sydney, Melbourne and Perth. Its annual "Poets on Wheels Tour", in which 15 member poets toured regional NSW, was one of its longest-running and most popular programmes.

=== Poetry Australia Foundation ===
The Poetry Australia Foundation was created as a community-based organisation in 2002 "to promote the reading, writing, reviewing and appreciation of poetry in all its forms". Its funding was assisted by the Australia Council, the New South Wales Government, the School of Creative Arts at the University of Melbourne (which hosted their website), the University of Wollongong, and private sponsors. Its publication arm was Five Islands Press, which published the biannual journal Blue Dog. The organisation was overseen by Ron Pretty.

=== Australian Poetry Centre ===
In June 2007, the Australian Poetry Centre was launched, based on the work of the Poetry Australia Foundation. The new organisation was housed at Glenfern, the former home of Arthur Merric Boyd and now a National Trust of Australia property, which was also home to the Victorian Writers' Centre. Satirist John Clarke was patron, and they took over publication of Blue Dog, had editors across the country. Seeing itself as a body for national coordination and advocacy, its listed objectives were:

- To strengthen the presence and profile of Australian poetry within Australia and overseas; and
- To promote the writing, reading, and appreciation of poetry as an integral part of personal and community life.

=== Merger ===
In 2011, the Poets Union Inc. (based in NSW) and Australian Poetry Centre Inc (based in Victoria) merged to become a national peak body, called Australian Poetry. It was created at the request of the Australia Council for the Arts, and came into being by the disestablishment of The Poets Union Inc. (NSW) and Australian Poetry Centre Inc. (Vic), with their assets being sunk into the new national body, with effect from 1 January 2011. These state-based bodies operated as associations under their respective state legislation, where all members were able to vote on matters affecting the business of the association. For the new entity to be able to operate nationally, it needed to be created as a company, under the Corporations Act 2001 (Cth), registered with the Australian Securities and Investments Commission (ASIC). Founding members were to become the inaugural directors, while voting members comprise current and past directors. Poetry Australia was incorporated as a not-for-profit public company "limited by guarantee" under the Corporations Act 2001, on 1 September 2010.

== Description ==
Australian Poetry is based at The Wheeler Centre in Melbourne. Its mission is to connect Australian poets with each other, and support them by promoting their poetry both in Australia and abroad, as well as serving and reaching more readers and lovers of poetry.

== Organisation and governance ==
As a company created under the conditions described above in History, there are two levels of members: subscriber members, who pay a membership fee in order to receive a range of services from the company, and constitutional members, who have in the past acted or who currently act as directors of the company. It has charitable status, able to funds through its public trust fund, The Australian Poetry Public Fund.

As of 2021, the chair of the Board of Australian Poetry is Martin Dolan. Poet, academic, comedian and photographer Yvette Holt, also chair of the First Nations Australia Writers Network (FNAWN), is a member of the board. Jacinta Le Plastrier is the CEO.

== Publications ==
- The biannual Australian Poetry Journal is a national poetry journal published by Australian Poetry. Each issue is guest-edited and contains articles as well as poems. It has been published in print form since 2010/2011 and online since Vol. 4, no. 2 (Summer 2014).
- The annual Australian Poetry Anthology, also known as Australian Poetry Members Anthology, is published in print each year, and is also available electronically. It contains a selection of poems written by members, and the first issue was published in 2012.

== Awards ==
The Scanlon Prize for Indigenous Poetry was a biennial award run by Australian Poetry (and before that the Poets' Union) with the support of the Scanlon Foundation, for the best collection of Indigenous poetry. In 2014, the First Nations Australia Writers Network (FNAWN) worked with Australian Poetry on the management of the prize. It was worth A$2,000 in 2016. Winners include:

- 2008: Yvette Holt, for Anonymous Premonition.
- 2010: Jeanine Leane, for Dark Secrets After Dreaming: AD 1887–1961.
- 2012: Lionel Fogarty for Connection Requital.
- 2014: Brenda Saunders
- 2016: Samuel Wagan Watson for Love Poems and Death Threats, chosen from a shortlist which included Tony Birch and Alison Whittaker.

== State-based organisations ==
Friendly Street Poets was established in 1975 in Adelaide, South Australia, and continues to exist as an independent entity.

The Melbourne Poets Union, which traces its origins back to the 1977 organisation, exists as of 2021 as a self-funded not-for-profit volunteer organisation.

WA Poets Inc. (WAPI) was established in 2006 in Western Australia as an incorporated, not-for-profit, volunteer-run organisation. It has organised the Perth Poetry Festival since 2004.

In November 2018, Poetry Sydney was established, with its public launch in February 2019. The organisation plays a coordination role for other poetry groups in (inner) Sydney, Western Sydney, greater Sydney and New South Wales, which includes hosting four quarterly meetings each year, as well as holding its own monthly program from March to November each year.

== Related pages ==
- List of Australian poets
