= Otherlands =

Otherlands may refer to:

- Otherlands (book), 2022 non-fiction book by Thomas Halliday
- Otherlands (Dragonlance), a Dungeons & Dragons game supplement
