= Black Witness =

2024 book by Amy McQuire

- Author: Amy McQuire
- Genre: Non-fiction
- Publisher: University of Queensland Press
- Publication date: 16 July 2024
- Publication place: Australia
- Pages: 336
- ISBN: 9780702263323

Black Witness is a 2024 non-fiction book by Aboriginal Australian journalist and researcher Amy McQuire. In the book McQuire criticises the mainstream media's treatment of stories about First Nations Australians, and argues that traditional journalistic norms like objectivity and fairness are "colonial" and are used to silence those without power. McQuire explained in an interview in Missing Perspectives that "objectivity has always been a myth, and it has always been used against those who are being oppressed."

== Summary ==
The book is structured in two sections: the first, White Witness, describes the mainstream media's treatment of stories about First Nations Australians, while the second, Black Witness, tells Indigenous peoples' stories from their own perspectives. In each section, McQuire discusses a number of case studies of the coverage of First Nations stories in the Australian media, including the death of Mulrunji Doomadgee, the death of Rebecca Maher, and the conviction of Kevin Henry. McQuire concludes with the argument that Indigenous media outlets, such as IndigenousX and National Indigenous Television, are essential for elevating the voices of "Black Witnesses".

== Reception ==
In a blurb published in The Guardian, Sian Cain wrote that the book "should be required reading for anyone working in journalism". Reviewing the book in The Conversation, Matthew Ricketson expressed some scepticism towards McQuire's claims that objectivity is a useless idea and that journalism and activism are inseparable, but praised the book and wrote that it helped the reader to "attend to the unstated assumptions of white witnesses, while hearing the voices of black witnesses". In a review published in the Journal of Criminology, Amanda Porter described the book as an "extraordinarily powerful, page turner of a debut book". The judging panel of the Stella Prize wrote that the book "eviscerates the approach of mainstream journalism in Australia" and that it is "a must-read for all engaged citizens, especially journalists who want to represent the fullness of contemporary Australia".

== Awards ==
Awards for Black Witness
Year	Award	Category	Result	Ref.
2025	Victorian Premier's Literary Awards	Prize for Indigenous Writing	Won	
2025	Stella Prize	—	Shortlisted	
2025	NSW Premier's Literary Awards	Douglas Stewart Prize for Nonfiction	Shortlisted	
2025	Queensland Literary Awards	Work of State Significance	Won	
