= Steam Pigs =

1997 debut novel by Melissa Lucashenko

- First edition
- Author: Melissa Lucashenko
- Language: English
- Genre: Novel
- Published: 1997 (University of Queensland Press)
- Publication place: Australia
- Media type: Print (hardback)
- Pages: 245
- ISBN: 978-0-702-22935-0
- OCLC: 1088063432

Steam Pigs is the 1997 debut novel by Melissa Lucashenko. It concerns Sue Wilson, a young Murri woman, who explores her Indigenous identity while living in Brisbane.

== Reception ==
A review in The Australian Journal of Indigenous Education wrote that "Steam Pigs takes us into the world of today's "untermensch" ...", and that it "..is a woman's book set in a very particular place and at a very particular time; but it confronts themes that are eternal and universal.". A Lesbians on the Loose review called it "...as unsentimental as it is empathetic.".

Steam Pigs has also been reviewed by the Journal of the Association for the Study of Australian Literature, Social Alternatives, Australian Literary Studies, Queensland Review, and Ilha do Desterro.

An excerpt appears in the Macquarie PEN Anthology of Australian Literature.

== Awards ==
- 1998 Dobbie Literary Award winner
- 1998 Commonwealth Writers' Prize (South-East Asia and Pacific Region) – shortlist for Best First Book
- 1999 New South Wales Premier's Literary Awards – Christina Stead Prize for Fiction, shortlist
