= Nib Literary Award =

Australian literary award

- Awarded for: a work that demonstrates excellence in literary research
- Sponsored by: Mark and Evette Moran
- Venue: Waverley Library
- Formerly called: The Nib Waverley Library Award for Literature
- Rewards: A$40,000 (winner); A$1,500 (shortlist); A$4,000 (People's Choice)
- Currently held by: Clever Men by Martin Thomas

The Nib Literary Award, established in 2002 at the suggestion of actor and producer Chris Haywood, the Patron of the Friends of Waverley Library, as The Nib Waverley Library Award for Literature and since 2017 known as the Mark and Evette Moran Nib Literary Award, is an Australian literary award for works in any genre, awarded annually at Waverley Library in Sydney. It is also known as 'The Nib': CAL Waverley Library Award for Literature.

== Award ==
Organised and supported by Waverley Council, the award recognises "excellence in literary research", and books in any genre and either non-fiction or fiction are considered for it. There are cash prizes for the winning and shortlisted books, with each of the shortlisted authors also earning the Alex Buzo Shortlist Prize.

In 2017, the Nib was renamed the Mark and Evette Moran Nib Literary Award, and three new categories were added: the People's Choice, the Alex Buzo Shortlist Prize, and a Military History Prize.

In the 2019 Awards, there was a prize pool of A$30,000: the main award A$20,000, the Nib Military History Prize A$3,000, Nib People's Choice Prize A$1,000 and the Alex Buzo Shortlist Prize, six prizes of A$1,000 each. The main sponsors were Mark and Evette Moran of Vaucluse. As of 2025, the main award is valued at A$40,000, the People's Choice A$4,000 and shortlisted authors receive A$1,500 each.

== Winners ==
Year	Author	Work	Publisher	Ref.
2002	Tim Low	The New Nature	Penguin	
2003	Barry Hill	Broken Song: T. G. H. Strehlow and Aboriginal Possession	Penguin	
2004	Geoffrey Blaney	Black Kettle and Full Moon	Penguin	
2005	Helen Garner	Joe Cinque's Consolation	Pan Macmillan	
2006	Gideon Haigh	Asbestos House: The Secret History of James Hardie Industries	Scribe	
2007	John Bailey	Mr. Stuart's Track: The Forgotten Life of Australia's Greatest Explorer	Pan Macmillan	
2008	Christopher Koch	The Memory Room	Penguin	
2009	Robert Gray	The Land I Came Through Last	Giramondo	
2010	Andrew Tink	William Charles Wentworth: Australia's Greatest Native Son	Allen & Unwin	
2011	Delia Falconer	Sydney	NewSouth	
2012	Jane Gleeson-White	Double Entry	Allen & Unwin	
2013	Gideon Haigh	On Warne	Hamish Hamilton	
2014	Clare Wright	The Forgotten Rebels of Eureka	Text	
2015	Erik Jensen	Acute Misfortune	Black Inc.	
2016	Rachel Landers	Who Bombed the Hilton?	NewSouth	
2017	Kate Cole-Adams	Anaesthesia: The Gift of Oblivion and the Mystery of Consciousness	Text	
2018	Helen Lewis	The Dead Still Cry Out	Text	
2019	Nadia Wheatley	Her Mother's Daughter	Text	
2020	Rebecca Giggs	Fathoms	Scribe	
2021	Luke Stegemann	Amnesia Road: Landscape, Violence and Memory	NewSouth	
2022	Delia Falconer	Signs and Wonders: Dispatches from a Time of Beauty and Loss	Scribner	
2023	Alison Bashford	An Intimate History of Evolution: The Story of the Huxley Family	Allen Lane	
2024	Melissa Lucashenko	Edenglassie	University of Queensland Press	
2025	Martin Thomas	Clever Men	Allen & Unwin	
2026	Susan Wyndham	Elizabeth Harrower: The Woman in the Watch Tower	NewSouth Publishing	

== Alex Buzo Shortlist Prize recipients ==
Year	Author	Title	Result	Ref.
2017	Kate Cole-Adams	Anesthesia: The Gift of Oblivion and the Mystery of Consciousness	Winner	
2017	Richard Fidler	Ghost Empire	Shortlist	
2017	Bruce Munday	Those Wild Rabbits: How They Shaped Australia	Shortlist	
2017	Madeleine O'Dea	The Phoenix Years: Art, Resistance, and the Making of Modern China	Shortlist	
2017	Sebastian Smee	The Art of Rivalry: Four Friendships, Betrayals, and Breakthroughs in Modern Art	Shortlist	
2018	Helen Lewis	The Dead Still Cry Out: The Story of a Combat Cameraman	Winner	
2018	Roger Averill	Relatively Famous	Shortlist	
2018	Tanya Bretherton	The Suitcase Baby: The Heartbreaking True Story of a Shocking Crime in 1920s Sydney	Shortlist	
2018	Sarah Krasnostein	The Trauma Cleaner	Shortlist	
2018	Bri Lee	Eggshell Skull	Shortlist	
2018	Charles Massy	Call of the Reed Warbler: A New Agriculture, a New Earth	Shortlist	
2019	Nadia Wheatley	Her Mother's Daughter: A Memoir	Winner	
2019	Alice Gorman	Dr Space Junk vs The Universe: Archaeology and the Future	Shortlist	
2019	Mary Hoban	An Unconventional Wife: The Life of Julia Sorell Arnold	Shortlist	
2019	Chloe Hooper	The Arsonist	Shortlist	
2019	Lee Kofman	Imperfect	Shortlist	
2020	Rebecca Giggs	Fathoms: The World in the Whale	Winner	
2020	Brenda Niall	Friends and Rivals: Four Great Australian Writers: Barbara Baynton, Ethel Turner, Nettie Palmer, Henry Handel Richardson	Shortlist	
2020	Imre Salusinszky	The Hilton Bombing: Evan Pederick and the Ananda Marga	Shortlist	
2020	Quentin Sprague	The Stranger Artist: Life at the Edge of Kimberley Painting	Shortlist	
2021	Luke Stegemann	Amnesia Road: Landscape, Violence and Memory	Winner	
2021	Gabrielle Carey	Only Happiness Here: In Search of Elizabeth Von Arnim	Shortlist	
2021	Kate Holden	The Winter Road: A Story of Legacy, Land and a Killing at Croppa Creek	Shortlist	
2021	Ramona Koval	A Letter to Layla: Travels to Our Deep Past and near Future	Shortlist	
2021	Sarah Krasnostein	The Believer: Encounters with the Beginning, the End, and Our Place in the Middle	Shortlist	
2021	Tim Olsen	Son of the Brush	Shortlist	
2022	Delia Falconer	Signs and Wonders: Dispatches from a Time of Beauty and Loss	Winner	
2022	Tim Bonyhady	Two Afternoons in the Kabul Stadium	Shortlist	
2022	Carol Major	The Asparagus Wars	Shortlist	
2022	Colin McLaren, Anna Sergi	Mafioso	Shortlist	
2022	Steve Toltz	Here Goes Nothing	Shortlist	
2023	Alison Bashford	An Intimate History of Evolution: The Story of the Huxley Family	Winner	
2023	André Dao	Anam	Shortlist	
2023	Jim Davidson	Emperors in Lilliput: Clem Christesen of Meanjin and Stephen Murray-Smith of Overland	Shortlist	
2023	Fiona McMillan-Webster	The Age of Seeds	Shortlist	
2023	Ross McMullin	Life So Full of Promise: Further Biographies of Australia's Lost Generation	Shortlist	
2023	Brigitta Olubas	Shirley Hazzard: A Writing Life	Shortlist	
2024	Melissa Lucashenko	Edenglassie	Winner	
2024	Shauna Bostock	Reaching Through Time: Finding My Family's Stories	Shortlist	
2024	Deborah Conway	Book of Life	Shortlist	
2024	Ryan Cropp	Donald Horne: A Life in the Lucky Country	Shortlist	
2024	Anna Funder	Wifedom: Mrs Orwell's Invisible Life	Shortlist	
2024	Dave Witty	What the Trees See: A Wander Through Millennia of Natural History in Australia	Shortlist	
2025	Martin Thomas	Clever Men	Winner	
2025	Helen Ennis	Max Dupain	Shortlist	
2025	Amy McQuire	Black Witness	Shortlist	
2025	Rick Morton	Mean Streak (People's Choice winner)	Shortlist	
2025	Samah Sabawi	Cactus Pear for My Beloved	Shortlist	
2025	Tasma Walton	I Am Nannertgarrook	Shortlist	
2026	Susan Wyndham	Elizabeth Harrower: The Woman in the Watch Tower	Winner	
2026	Rosa Campbell	The Book that Taught the World to Orgasm and Then Disappeared: Shere Hite and the Hite Report	Shortlist	
2026	Edwina Shaw	Dear Madman	Shortlist	
2026	Bernice Barry	The Names of a Hare	Shortlist	
2026	Jennifer Harrison	Sideshow History	Shortlist	
2026	Tyson Yunkaporta & Megan Kelleher	Snake Talk	Shortlist	
2026	Fiona Kelly McGregor	The Trap	Shortlist	
