= Kate Howarth =

Kate Howarth may refer to:

- Kate Howarth (writer) (born 1950), Australian writer
- Kate Howarth (soccer) (born 1991), American soccer player
