= John C Marsden Medal =

The John C Marsden Medal of the Linnean Society of London was established in 2012 and is awarded annually to the author of "the best doctoral thesis in biology." It is open to any candidate whose research has been carried out whilst registered at any UK institution. Theses on the full range of biology are eligible.

John C Marsden was the executive secretary of the Linnean Society of London from 1989 to 2004.

The medal was awarded for the first time in 2012.

== Recipients of the John C Marsden Medal ==
- Heather E. White (2024)
- Tomos Potter (2023)
- Timothy AC Lamont (2022)
- Benjamin Van Doren (2021)
- Patrick Kennedy (2020)
- Sarah Hill (2019)
- Thais Nogales da Costa Vasconcelos (2018)
- Kwaku Aduse-Poku (2017)
- Thomas Halliday (2016)
- not awarded (2015)
- Orly Razgour (2014)
- Haris Saslis Lagoudakis (2013)
- Joshua Coulcher (2012)
