= Elfie Shiosaki =

Australian writer

Elfie Shiosaki is a Noongar and Yawuru poet and academic. Originally based in Perth, Western Australia, she moved to Canberra in 2022 as associate professor at the Australian National University.

Her debut book Homecoming won the 2022 Western Australian Premier's Prize for an Emerging Writer. It was also shortlisted in the 2022 ALS Gold Medal, Stella Prize, John Bray Poetry Award, and received highly commended in the Victorian Premier's Literary Awards. In 2021 it was shortlisted in the Queensland Literary Awards and in 2022 for the Prime Minister's Literary Award for poetry.

Her second poetry collection, Refugia, was published in 2024. It was shortlisted for the 2025 Victorian Premier's Literary Award for Indigenous Writing.

Shiosaki holds a doctorate in Human Rights Education from Curtin University, working there on a fellowship 2015–2018. She was a lecturer in the School of Indigenous studies at the University of Western Australia 2018–2022. She moved to Canberra as associate professor at the Australian National University in 2022.

Her surname comes from a Japanese ancestor who was a pearl diver in Broome.

== Works ==
- Shiosaki, Elfie (2021-04-01). Homecoming. Magabala Books. ISBN 978-1-925768-94-7.
- —— (2024-07-01). Refugia. Magabala Books. ISBN 978-1-922777-13-3.

=== As editor ===
- Martin, Linda; Shiosaki, Elfie, eds. (2020-11-01). maar bidi: next generation black writing. Magabala Books. ISBN 978-1-925936-42-1.
