= Laurie Hergenhan =

Australian literary editor and scholar (1931–2019)

- Born: 15 March 1931; Bega, New South Wales
- Died: 21 July 2019 (aged 88); Australia
- Occupation: Literary scholar

Laurence Thomas Hergenhan AO FAHA (15 March 1931 – 21 July 2019) was an Australian literary scholar.

After completing his schooling at St Bernard's College, Katoomba, Hergenhan attended the University of Sydney, where he received his MA in 1953 and Diploma of Education in 1957. He completed his PhD at Birkbeck College in London before returning to Australia in 1960 to take up a lectureship at the University of Tasmania.

He was the founder and for many years the editor of Australian Literary Studies (1963) and the editor of the 1988 Penguin New Literary History of Australia and published on Xavier Herbert. He was a professor emeritus of The University of Queensland.

Hergenhan was made an Officer of the Order of Australia in 1994 for "service to Australian literary scholarship and to education". He was elected a Fellow of the Australian Academy of the Humanities in 1993.

== Bibliography ==
=== Books ===
- A Colonial City: High and low life (editor, 1972)
- Unnatural Lives: Studies in Australian fiction about the convicts, from James Tucker to Patrick White (1983)
- The Australian short story: A collection 1890s to 1990s (editor, 1986, 1992, 2002)
- Penguin New Literary History of Australia (general editor, 1988)
- No Casual Traveller: Hartley Grattan and Australia-US connections (1995)
- Xavier Herbert: Letters (co-editor with Frances De Groen, 2002)

=== Selected articles ===
- Hergenhan, Laurie (December 2002). "Containing the mass: New maps of Australian literature". Quadrant. 46 (12 [392]): 59–63.
- Hergenhan, Laurie (July–August 2003). "The struggles of the little magazines". Quadrant. 47 (7–8 [398]): 84–85.
