= Amy McQuire =

Australian journalist and academic

- Occupations: Academic and journalist

Academic background
- Education: University of Queensland

Academic work
- Institutions: Queensland University of Technology
- Notable works: Black Witness

Amy McQuire is an Indigenous Australian academic, journalist and author. She is a Darumbal and South Sea Islander woman and works as a Senior Lecturer at the Queensland University of Technology. McQuire was editor of the National Indigenous Times and was nominated for a Walkley Award in 2019 for her writing about Indigenous Australians and the criminal justice system.

McQuire is the author of a children's picture book, Day Break, and a non-fiction book, Black Witness. Black Witness was shortlisted for the Stella Prize and the Douglas Stewart Prize for Non-Fiction, and won the 2025 Victorian Premier's Literary Award for Indigenous Writing.

== Early life and education ==
McQuire grew up in Rockhampton in Central Queensland. She is the daughter of a Darumbal and South Sea Islander father and a non-Indigenous mother. Her father worked as a guard at the Etna Creek jail during her childhood. McQuire holds a PhD from the University of Queensland, where she studied the media's portrayals of violence perpetrated against Aboriginal women.

== Career ==
McQuire began her career as a cadet at the National Indigenous Times after graduating from high school. She later became editor of the National Indigenous Times and Tracker Magazine, and worked as a correspondent for NITV. She also worked as an Indigenous Affairs reporter at BuzzFeed. In 2019, she was nominated for a Walkley Award for Coverage of Indigenous Affairs for an article she wrote for the Griffith Review about the conviction of Indigenous man Ken Henry. McQuire works as a Senior Lecturer at the Queensland University of Technology.

McQuire won the 2027 Peter Blazey Fellowship for "State of Disappearance".

== Writing ==
=== Day Break ===
In 2021, McQuire released the children's picture book Day Break. The book was illustrated by Matt Chun and was published by Hardie Grant. The book explores the Australia Day debate and the ways in which First Nations children experience the day. McQuire told ABC News that she was motivated to write the book after struggling to find stories with which to teach her two children about Indigenous perspectives on Australia Day. She described the book as "grounded in strength and resistance and the resistance of a family on Invasion Day holding their own ceremonies," and said that she hoped the book would be an educational tool for both Indigenous and non-Indigenous children. The Australian bookseller Dymocks withdrew the title from sale in January 2026 after a campaign by Murdoch newspapers against the book's illustrator Matt Chun.

=== Black Witness ===
In 2024 McQuire's book Black Witness was published by the University of Queensland Press. In the book McQuire criticises the mainstream media's treatment of stories about First Nations Australians and argues that Indigenous media, or the voices of "black witnesses", is critical for understanding Indigenous issues. In a review published in The Guardian, Sian Cain wrote that the book "should be required reading for anyone working in journalism." Reviewing the book in The Conversation, Matthew Ricketson expressed some scepticism towards McQuire's claims that objectivity is a pointless ideal and that journalism and activism are inseparable, but praised the book and wrote that it helped the reader to "attend to the unstated assumptions of white witnesses, while hearing the voices of black witnesses." In a review published in the Journal of Criminology, Amanda Porter described the book as an "extraordinarily powerful, page turner of a debut book." The book won the Victorian Premier's Literary Award for Indigenous Writing and the Queensland Premier's Award for a Work of State Significance in 2025. It was shortlisted for the Stella Prize and the Douglas Stewart Prize for Non-Fiction in the same year.
