= Philip McLaren =

Australian writer

Philip McLaren (born 1943) is an Aboriginal Australian author and academic known for literary fiction, detective stories and thrillers.

== Biography ==
McLaren is an Aboriginal Australian of the Kamilaroi people. Both of his parents, who have some Scottish heritage, are from Coonabarabran, New South Wales. He was born in Redfern, Sydney.

He holds a Doctor of Creative Arts degree.

He has worked in a range of occupations, including as an illustrator, designer, animator, sculptor, copywriter and creative director in television, advertising and film production companies. Over a period of 12 years he lived and worked in Canada, USA, England, New Zealand and the Bahamas.

He has delivered lectures or readings at a range of institutions and festivals across the world, including the University of Alberta in Canada; the University of Sydney; National Library of Australia; State Library of New South Wales; Melbourne Writers Festival; Adelaide Writers' Week; Sydney Writers' Festival; Byron Bay Writers Festival; New Zealand's inaugural Toi Maori Festival; and was invited by the Goethe-Institut to speak at their inaugural Writers’ Festival at the Haus der Kulturen der Welt in Berlin.

McLaren was a member of the working party involved in the creation of the First Nations Australia Writers Network (FNAWN) in 2012.

He has worked as a lecturer at Southern Cross University.

He lived in the Byron Bay area of New South Wales as of 2009.

== Writing career ==
McLaren is known for literary fiction, detective stories and thrillers. He has also written non-fiction, social commentary, screenplays and academic essays. Four of his novels have been translated and distributed internationally.

== Awards ==
- Sweet Water – Stolen Land received the 1992 David Unaipon Award for Australian Indigenous literature.
- Murder in Utopia (published in some countries as Utopia) won the 2010 Récit de l'Ailleurs (meaning "story from elsewhere") prize, voted by students at Lycée-Collège d'État Émile Letournel, a high school in the French overseas territory of Saint Pierre and Miquelon. It was also nominated at the Ned Kelly Awards for crime writing.

== Books ==
- Sweet Water – Stolen Land (University of Queensland Press, 1993) – historical fiction
- Scream Black Murder (HarperCollins, 1995) – crime fiction
- Lightning Mine (HarperCollins, 1999) – thriller
- There’ll be New Dreams (Magabala Books, 2001) – historical fiction
- Murder in Utopia
- West of Eden
