= Sand Talk =

2019 book by Tyson Yunkaporta

Sand Talk: How Indigenous Thinking Can Save the World is a 2019 book by Tyson Yunkaporta that sets out to look at the world, especially sustainability, through Aboriginal perspectives. Yunkaporta calls for fewer token gestures such as land acknowledgements and more meaningful inclusion. The book engages with other Indigenous people to draw from their lived knowledge, which creates paradoxes for the reader.
