= Homecoming (poetry collection) =

2021 poetry collection by Elfie Shiosaki

- Author: Elfie Shiosaki
- Genre: Poetry
- Publisher: Magabala Books
- Publication date: 1 April 2021
- Publication place: Australia
- Pages: 152
- ISBN: 9781925768947

Homecoming is a 2021 poetry collection by Aboriginal Australian poet Elfie Shiosaki. The collection is about the four generations of Noongar women from whom Shiosaki is descended. The collection won the Premier's Prize for an Emerging Writer at the 2021 Western Australian Premier's Book Awards and was shortlisted for several other awards, including the Prime Minister's Literary Award for Poetry and the Stella Prize.

== Reception ==
The collection received positive reviews. In a review in Australian Book Review, Jeanine Leane described Homecoming as a "stellar collection" that "collapse[s] linear colonial time in a seamless weave of past, present, and future interconnected and unresolved, much like the reality of Aboriginal life". A review in Meanjin concurred, praising the non-linearity of time and relationships in Shiosaki's work. In a review in The Saturday Paper, Carissa Lee wrote that the collection nonetheless had "an integrity that honours the many voices it presents". Writing in The Conversation, Camila Nelson described the collection as "intimate and personal, but also epic in the breadth of its history of Aboriginal people".

== Awards ==
Awards for Homecoming
Year	Award	Category	Result	Ref.
2022	Prime Minister's Literary Awards	Poetry	Shortlisted	
2022	ALS Gold Medal	—	Shortlisted	
2022	Stella Prize	—	Shortlisted	
2022	Adelaide Festival Awards for Literature	John Bray Poetry Award	Shortlisted	
2021	Western Australian Premier's Book Awards	Premier's Prize for an Emerging Writer	Won	
2021	Queensland Literary Awards	Judith Wright Calanthe Award	Shortlisted	
