= Vivienne Cleven =

Indigenous Australian fiction writer

- Born: 27 April 1968 (age 58)
- Occupation: Indigenous Australian writer
- Period: 2001-2007
- Subject: Australian Indigenous Women
- Notable works: Bitin' back
- Notable awards: David Unaipon Award (2000)

Vivienne Cleven (born 1968) is an Indigenous Australian fiction author of the Kamilaroi people. Her writing includes the novels Bitin' Back and Her Sister's Eye.

== Early life and education ==
Born in 1968 in Surat, Queensland, Vivienne Cleven grew up in the homeland of her Aboriginal heritage (Kamilaroi Nation).

Leaving school at 13, she worked with her father as a jillaroo: building fences, mustering cattle, and working various jobs on stations throughout Queensland and New South Wales.

== Career ==
In 2000, with the manuscript Just Call Me Jean, Cleven entered and won the David Unaipon Award for Unpublished Indigenous Writer. Re-titled and published the following year, Bitin' Back was shortlisted in the 2002 Courier-Mail Book of the Year Award and in the 2002 South Australian Premier's Award for Fiction.

Cleven adapted Bitin' Back into a play script, which was staged by Brisbane's Kooemba Jdarra Indigenous Theatre Company in September 2003.

Her Sister's Eye was published in 2002, and was chosen in the 2003 People's Choice shortlist of One Book One Brisbane. In 2004, Her Sister’s Eye won the Victorian Premier's Literary Awards Prize for Indigenous Writing.

In 2006, Cleven won the Kate Challis RAKA Award for both Bitin' Back and Her Sister's Eye.

Cleven's writing is included in Fresh Cuttings, the first anthology of UQP Black Australian Writing, published in 2003, and the collection Contemporary Indigenous Plays in 2007.

In 2017, Cleven penned a column for the journal Lesbians on the Loose, entitled, "Dyketopia: The Internet's most popular cyberspace precinct has plenty going on for lesbians".

== Themes ==
Cleven's works delve into themes of gender identity, queer expression, mental health, domestic and sexual abuse, connection to Country, and racial prejudice in a postcolonial Australian context. Both Bitin' Back and Her Sister's Eye critically forefront the Indigenous woman's experience in situations where their race and gender are seminal to their stories. Her Sister's Eye is considered part of the modern wave of postcolonial gothic fiction.

== Selected publications ==
- Bitin' Back, 2001
- "Writing Bitin' Back." Writing Queensland, no. 96, 2001
- Her Sister's Eye, 2002
- "Dyketopia: The Internet's most popular cyberspace precinct has plenty going on for lesbians". Lesbians on the Loose, vol. 18, no. 11, 2007

== Awards ==
For Bitin' Back (2000):

- Winner, David Unaipon Award, 2000
- Shortlisted for the Courier-Mail Book of the Year Award, 2002
- Shortlisted for the South Australian Premier's Awards for Fiction, 2002
- Winner, Kate Challis RAKA Award, 2006

Her Sister’s Eye (2002):

- People's Choice shortlist of One Book One Brisbane, 2003
- Winner, Kate Challis RAKA Award, 2006
- Winner, Victorian Premier's Literary Awards Prize for Indigenous Writing, 2004
