= Tyson Yunkaporta =

Australian academic, author, and Indigenous thinker

Tyson Yunkaporta is an Australian academic, author, and indigenous thinker. He is best known for his book Sand Talk: How Indigenous Thinking Can Save the World. Yunkaporta's work explores Indigenous knowledge systems and their relevance to contemporary global challenges, including sustainability, education, and systems thinking.

== Career ==
Yunkaporta is research fellow at Deakin University in Melbourne, Australia, where he was formerly a senior lecturer, teaching Indigenous Knowledge Systems. He has also worked as a researcher, educator, and woodcarver. His multidisciplinary approach combines traditional Indigenous practices with contemporary academic frameworks.

=== Sand Talk: How Indigenous Thinking Can Save the World ===
In 2019, Yunkaporta published Sand Talk: How Indigenous Thinking Can Save the World, a book that gained international recognition for its innovative approach to understanding Indigenous knowledge systems. The book uses storytelling, diagrams, and personal anecdotes to explore complex concepts such as sustainability, relationality, and systems thinking. Sand Talk has been praised for its accessible and thought-provoking style, offering readers a way to engage with Indigenous perspectives on global issues. Yunkaporta calls for fewer token gestures such as land acknowledgements and more meaningful inclusion. The book has been described as a unique contribution to the fields of philosophy, ecology, and education. It challenges Western paradigms of knowledge and advocates for a more holistic, interconnected worldview.

=== Snake Talk: How The World's Ancient Serpent Stories Can Guide Us ===
In 2026, Yunkaporta won the Alex Buzo Shortlist Prize and was shortlisted for the Mark and Evette Moran Nib Award for Literature for Snake Talk, co-authored with Megan Kelleher.

== Publications ==
- Sand Talk: How Indigenous Thinking Can Save the World (2019)
- Yunkaporta, Tyson (30 July 2024). Right Story, Wrong Story: Adventures in Indigenous Thinking, book by Tyson Yunkaporta. Text Publishing Company. ISBN 978-1-922790-95-8.
- Yunkaporta, Tyson (2025). Right story, wrong story: how to have fearless conversations in hell (First HarperOne hardcover ed.). New York: HarperOne. ISBN 9780063382398.
- Tyson Yunkaporta and Megan Kelleher (2025). Snake Talk: How The World's Ancient Serpent Stories Can Guide Us. Text Publishing Company.

== See also ==
- Systems thinking
- Sustainability
