= Ellen van Neerven =

Aboriginal Australian writer and poet

Ellen van Neerven (born 1990) is an Aboriginal Australian writer, educator and editor. Their first work of fiction, Heat and Light (2014), won several awards, and in 2019 van Neerven won the Queensland Premier's Young Publishers and Writers Award. Their second collection of poetry, Throat (2020), won three awards at the 2021 New South Wales Premier's Literary Awards, including Book of the Year.

== Early life and education ==
Van Neerven was born in 1990 to Dutch and Aboriginal parents, and is of the Mununjali clan of the Yugambeh nation. They grew up in Brisbane.

They studied creative writing at the Queensland University of Technology, graduating in 2010.

== Writing career ==
Van Neerven first book, Heat and Light, won the 2013 Queensland Literary Awards' David Unaipon Award for unpublished Indigenous writers, the 2016 NSW Premier's Literary Award's Indigenous Writers Prize and the 2015 Dobbie Literary Award and was shortlisted for the Stella Prize in 2015.

In 2013, they edited the anthology Writing Black: New Indigenous Writing from Australia.

One of van Neerven's short stories, "Confidence Game", was featured on the SBS podcast series True Stories in 2015. Their second book, the poetry collection Comfort Food, was published in 2016. In 2017, the poem "Mango" from Comfort Food was chosen as a sample text in the English Paper 1 examination of the New South Wales Higher School Certificate

Van Neerven has had some of their poetry translated into Yugambeh by Shaun Davies.

Throat (2020) is van Neerven's second collection of poems, and consists of five themed chapters: "The haunt-walk in"; "Whiteness is always approaching"; "I can't wait to meet my future genders"; "Speaking outside"; and " Take me to the back of my throat". Throat won three prizes at the New South Wales Premier's Literary Awards: the Book of the Year award; the Kenneth Slessor Prize for Poetry; and the Multicultural NSW Award.

Van Neerven published a piece in Griffith Review about sport, entitled "No Limits", in September 2021. Described as "part creative memoir, part reportage, part theoretical essay and part history lesson," the piece examines the exclusionary nature of sport, which leads to a very low rate of participation by non-binary people.

In October 2021, they received a Sidney Myer Creative Fellowship.

In 2023, they released their first nonfiction book, Personal Score, which combines memoir, cultural theory and poetry to discuss the history of sport.

In June 2024, text from two of van Neerven's works, titled Shoutlines and yaburuhma dugun (infinite sky) were shown on the Federation Square Big Screen, presented as part of The Blak Infinite program at the 2024 RISING festival in Melbourne.

Their first play, swim, produced by Griffin Theatre Company, premiered at the Carriageworks in Sydney in July 2024.

In 2026, they released the middle-grade novel Ruby's Web.

== Other activities ==
In September 2015, in a collaboration with Poets House in New York, a recording of six First Nations Australia Writers Network members reading their work was presented at a special event. Van Neerven was one of the readers, along with Jeanine Leane, Dub Leffler, Melissa Lucashenko, Bruce Pascoe and Jared Thomas.

Van Neerven was co-host and creative producer of two podcasts: Extraordinary Voices for Extraordinary Times, launched in June 2020 with Omar Sakr; and Between the Leaves, launched in October 2020 with Hermina Burns.

== Personal life ==
They are openly queer and non-binary, using they/them pronouns.

== Awards and honours ==
Year	Nominated work	Award	Category	Result	Ref.
2013	Heat and Light	Queensland Literary Awards	David Unaipon Award	Winner	
2015	Heat and Light	Nita Kibble Literary Awards	Dobbie Literary Award	Winner	
2015	Heat and Light	Stella Prize		Shortlisted	
2015	Heat and Light	The Sydney Morning Herald Best Young Australian Novelists		Winner	
2016	Heat and Light	New South Wales Premier's Literary Awards	Indigenous Writer's Prize	Winner	
2016	Heat and Light	Victorian Premier's Literary Awards	Indigenous Writing	Winner	
2019		Queensland Literary Awards	Young Publishers and Writers	Winner	
2020	Throat	University of Queensland Press Quentin Bryce Award		Winner	
2020	Throat	Queensland Literary Awards	Judith Wright Calanthe Award	Shortlisted	
2021	Throat	Victorian Premier's Literary Awards	Poetry	Shortlisted	
2021	Throat	ALS Gold Medal		Shortlisted	
2021	Throat	New South Wales Premier's Literary Awards	Book of the Year	Winner	
2021	Throat	New South Wales Premier's Literary Awards	Kenneth Slessor Prize for Poetry	Winner	
2021	Throat	New South Wales Premier's Literary Awards	Multicultural NSW Award	Winner	
2022	Throat	Adelaide Festival Awards for Literature	John Bray Poetry Award	Shortlisted	
2024	Personal Score	Victorian Premier's Literary Awards	Nonfiction	Winner	
2024	Personal Score	Victorian Premier's Literary Awards	Indigenous Writing	Shortlisted	
2024	Personal Score	Queensland Literary Awards	Work of State Significance	Shortlisted	
2024	Personal Score	Queensland Literary Awards	Nonfiction Book	Shortlisted	

== Selected works ==
=== Fiction ===
- —— (2014). Heat and Light. University of Queensland Press. ISBN 9780702252945.
- —— (2026). Ruby's Web. Magabala Books. ISBN 978-1-922864-01-7.

==== Short stories ====
- —— (Spring 2014). "Skin". Meanjin. 73 (3).
- —— (August 2015). "Wetskins". The Lifted Brow. 8 (2). Archived from the original on 19 November 2016.
- —— (August 2012). "S&J". McSweeney's (41).

=== Poetry ===
==== Collections ====
- —— (2016). Comfort Food. University of Queensland Press. ISBN 9780702254055.
- —— (2020). Throat. University of Queensland Press. ISBN 978-0-7022-6434-4.

==== Poems ====
- —— (Spring 2015). "Invisible spears". Overland (220).

=== Nonfiction ===
- —— (2023). Personal Score: Sport, Culture, Identity. University of Queensland Press. ISBN 9780702267529.

=== As editor ===
- ——, ed. (2014). Writing Black: New Indigenous Writing from Australia. State Library of Queensland. ISBN 9780975803059.
- ——, ed. (2017). Joiner Bay and Other Stories. Margaret River Press. ISBN 9781525250873.
- ——, ed. (2020). Homeland Calling: Words from a New Generation of Aboriginal and Torres Strait Islander Voices. Desert Pea Media/Hardie Grant Publishing. ISBN 9781743586570.

== Reviews ==
- Birch, Tony (August 2014). "Heat and Light by Ellen Fan Neerven". Readings.
- Patrić, Alec (September 2014). "Heat and light by Ellen van Neerven". Australian Book Review (364).
