= Australian Literary Studies =

- Language: English

Publication details
- History: 1963–present

Standard abbreviations
- ISO 4: Aust. Lit. Stud.

Indexing
- ISSN: 1837-6479

Links
- Journal homepage

Australian Literary Studies is a peer-reviewed academic journal of literary studies, specialising in historical, critical, and theoretical studies of Australian literature. It was established in 1963 by Laurie Hergenhan (University of Queensland), who edited the journal for its first forty years. It was then edited by Leigh Dale (University of Wollongong) from 2002 to 2015; in 2010 the journal increased its publication frequency to quarterly, with two issues (May and October) focussed on Australian authors and texts, along with two "general" issues (June and November). Successful special issues have focussed on queer writers and writing, the environment, medievalism, and biopolitics. Since 2016, the journal has been edited by Julieanne Lamond (Australian National University). In 2016, the journal ceased producing print volumes and digitised its entire archive. It also moved to a rolling publication model involving a mix of open access for new essays and low-cost subscription access to the archive. The journal, described as "the preeminent journal in Australian literary criticism", is abstracted and indexed by the MLA International Bibliography and AustLit.
