= Thomas Halliday (writer) =

British palaeobiologist and author

Thomas John Dixon Halliday is a British palaeobiologist and author.

== Biography ==
Halliday earned a degree in natural sciences (zoology) from Pembroke College, Cambridge, followed by a master's in palaeobiology from the University of Bristol, and a PhD in palaeobiology from University College London.

Halliday was awarded the Linnean Society's John C Marsden Medal for the best doctorate in biological studies.

In 2022, Halliday published Otherlands: A World In The Making about the history of life on Earth. In 2022, it was shortlisted for the James Cropper Wainwright Prize for Nature Writing, and longlisted for the Baillie Gifford Prize for Non-Fiction.

The Sunday Times noted its "Sixteen superbly vivid snapshots of our prehistoric world". New Scientist called it a "A fascinating journey through Earth's history".

Halliday is an international croquet player, first selected to represent Scotland in the Golf Croquet World Team Championships (Tier 2) in 2021.. At club level, he plays for Enfield Croquet Club.

== Publications ==
- Otherlands: A World in the Making, Allen Lane, 2022
