= Mullumbimby (novel) =

Novel by Melissa Lucashenko

- Author: Melissa Lucashenko
- Language: English, Aboriginal Australian English, Bundjalung, Yugambeh
- Genre: novel
- Publisher: University of Queensland Press, Australia
- Publication date: 2013
- Publication place: Australia
- Media type: Print (Paperback)
- Pages: 280
- ISBN: 9780702239199
- Preceded by: Uptown Girl
- Followed by: Too Much Lip

Mullumbimby (2013) is a novel by Australian author Melissa Lucashenko. It concerns Jo Breen, a Bundjalung woman, who buys some of her country and the conflicts that arises. Mullumbimby won the Fiction category of the Queensland Literary Awards in 2013.

== Plot summary ==
Following her divorce, Jo Breen mows the lawns at a cemetery for white settlers in the small town of Mullumbimby, inland from the north coast of New South Wales. She works to buy herself a block of land and to care for herself and her teenage daughter. Breen is a Goorie, an Indigenous woman from the local area, and her relationship to the land she owns is deep-felt and defining.

Jo becomes embroiled in a local Native Title dispute between two rival Aboriginal families, which leads her to profound discoveries about culture, and her and her daughter's place in it.

== Notes ==
- Dedication: for my teachers
- Epigraph: "Thin love ain't love at all" - Toni Morrison, Beloved
- Author's note: This novel is set mainly on the Arakwal lands of the Bundjalung Nation. Like the characters, however, the specific locations of Tin Wagon Road, Piccabeen and Lake Majestic are entirely fictional. They exist only in the author's imagination.

== Reviews ==
- James Tierney in The Newton Review of Books noted: "Lucashenko bursts the myth that Indigenous culture must present a unified face to Australia in order to be strong. The balance of voices here is a careful one, born of deep respect and a clear eye."
- Eve Vincent in The Sydney Review of Books found "The novel plumbs the depths of bitterness, conflict and destruction the native title claims process too often leaves in its wake. It brilliantly captures, in a robust vernacular style, the fury and cynicism spawned by the long-lasting and emotionally exhausting claims process."
- Also reviewed by Radio National, The Sydney Morning Herald, Australian Book Review, Southerly, and The Age.

== Awards and nominations ==
- 2013 shortlisted Queensland Literary Awards — The Courier-Mail People's Choice Queensland Book of the Year
- 2013 winner Queensland Literary Awards — Fiction Book Award — Deloitte Fiction Book Award
- 2014 longlisted the Stella Prize
- 2014 longlisted Miles Franklin Literary Award
- 2014 shortlisted Nita Kibble Literary Award
- 2014 winner Victorian Premier's Literary Awards — Prize for Indigenous Writing
- 2015 longlisted International Dublin Literary Award
