= Ray Mancini (businessman) =

Australian businesspeople

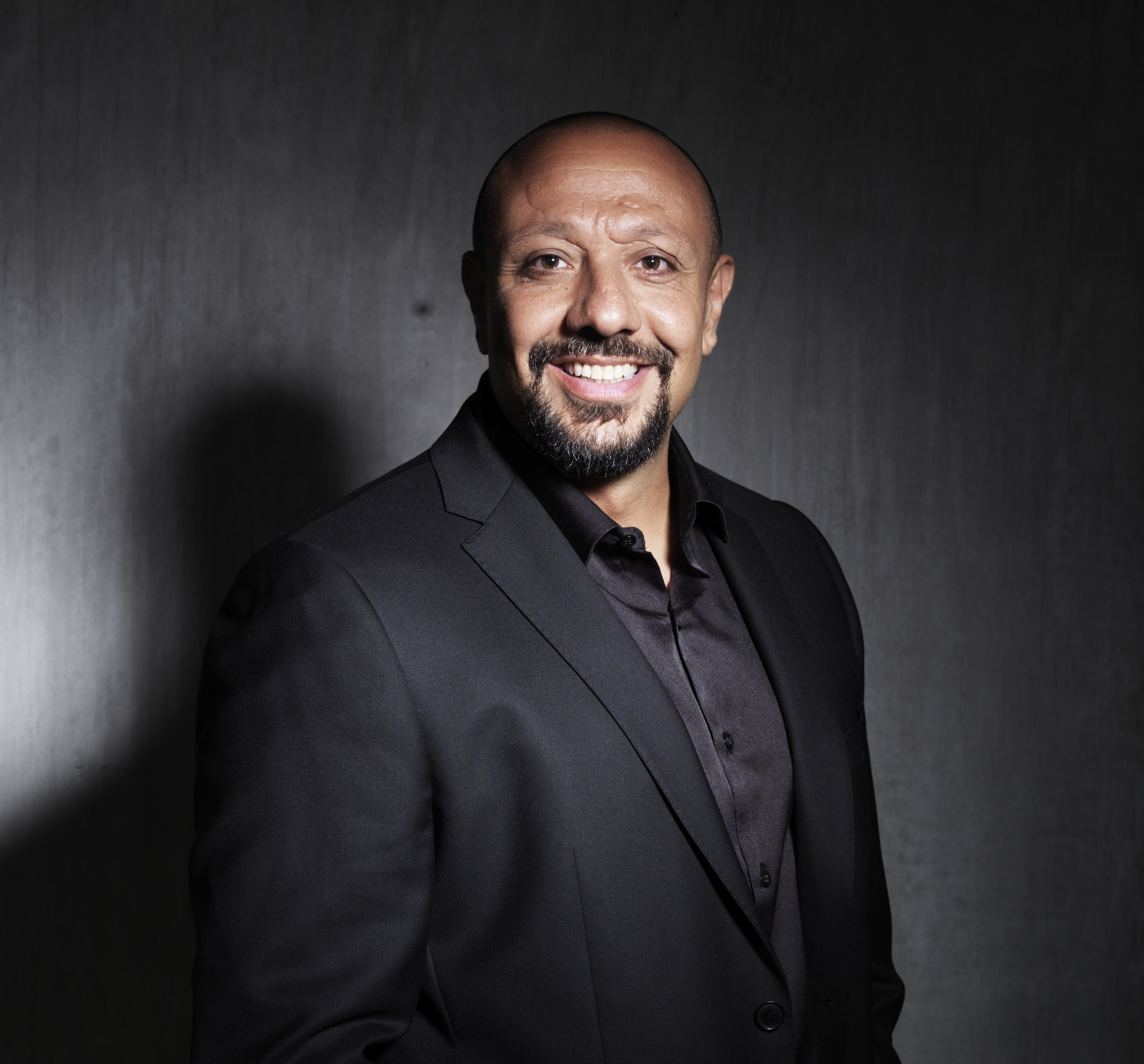
- Occupation: Author
- Employer: Security Intelligence Group International
- Known for: Zen, Meditation and the Art of Shooting
- Website: raymancini.com.au

Ray Mancini is an Australian law enforcement educator, writer and businessman. Mancini is best known as the author of Zen, Meditation and the Art of Shooting. He is also a writer for Security Solutions, a security industry magazine, and Commando News.

Mancini is the chief executive officer of Security Intelligence Group International, a security consultation and training company, and the founder of Samscatt Sports Shooting, Inc. Mancini also educates and trains on professional security, risk assessment and risk management at SIG Academy Australia. He has worked for the personal security of Mariah Carey, Ice-T, Alaa Zalzali and Zoe Badwi.

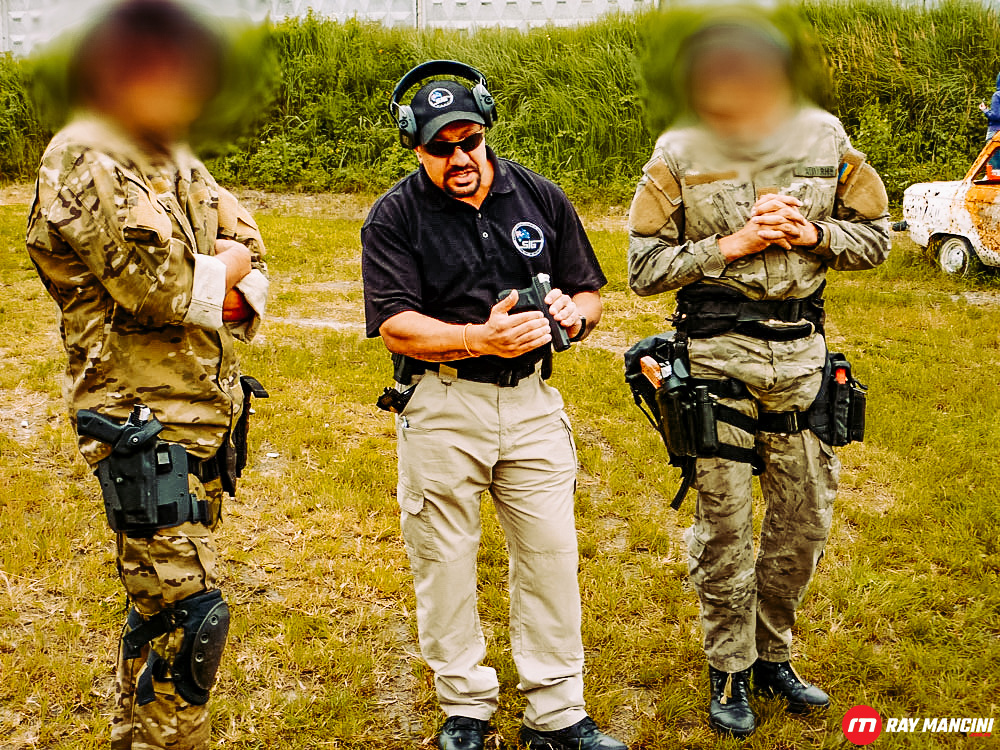
Mancini training Ukrainian Special Forces

In 2015, Mancini announced Pilum Arms, a firearms manufacturer based in Italy. In February 2015, Mancini was recognized for his work with SIG GROUP International Limited at the Nifnex Influential 100 Awards. In November 2015, Mancini shaved his goatee to help raise $10,000 for the Leukaemia Foundation. He led a Ukrainian class for "Ігри Героїв", an international sports competition for veterans of the Armed Forces of Ukraine, in 2017.
