= AustLit =

Online database about Australian literature

- History: 2000–present
- Languages: English, Australian Aboriginal languages

Access
- Cost: By subscription; individuals may access it via their library. Limited guest access.

Coverage
- Disciplines: Australian literature: including criticism, bibliography, biography
- Geospatial coverage: Australia

Links
- Website: www.austlit.edu.au

AustLit: The Australian Literature Resource (also known as AustLit: Australian Literature Gateway; and AustLit: The Resource for Australian Literature) is a national bio-bibliographical database of Australian literature. It is an internet-based, non-profit collaboration between researchers and librarians from Australian universities, housed at The University of Queensland (UQ). The AustLit database comprises biographical and bibliographical records of Australian storytelling and print cultures, with over 1 million individual 'work' records, and over 75 discrete research projects.

One such project, BlackWords, is a dataset within AustLit detailing the lives and work of Indigenous Australian authors, which includes Aboriginal Australians and Torres Strait Islander writers and storytellers.

== History ==
Groups of researchers across eight universities (UNSW @ ADFA, The University of Queensland, Monash University, Flinders University, Deakin, the University of Western Australia, the University of Canberra, and the University of Sydney) and the National Library of Australia, combined several independent databases on literary studies into a single information space in 1998. This cooperation and collaboration resulted in the formation of AustLit. The AustLit website was released online in 2001, and formally launched in 2002.

Initially led by UNSW at ADFA, leadership of the consortium transferred to the University of Queensland in 2002. AustLit is now overseen wholly by The University of Queensland. The first dataset comprised around 300,000 biographical and bibliographical records, including indexes to magazines, newspapers and scholarly journals. Most of the indexing has been done at UQ since 2014 and AustLit is now maintained and published by UQ.

AustLit has received funding from participating universities and project funding from the Australian Research Council (ARC). For example, in 2008, the ARC provided A$500,000 for a project to complete the retrospective record of Australian book history, establish a new resource for historical research on children's literature, and further develop the database of Indigenous Australian writers and story tellers (see BlackWords below).

In 2012, AustLit underwent a comprehensive redesign of both the public interface and the indexing infrastructure.

From 2017, due to funding cuts to participating universities, AustLit modified its indexing policies, including reducing the number of periodicals indexed. Periodicals' publication details are still provided, and content indexing continues for significant newspapers, periodicals, and anthologies, but comprehensive content indexing, particularly of sole-author collections, ceased. A system for volunteer indexing is available.

== Data Model ==
AustLit was the first large-scale implementation of the FRBR Model (Functional Requirements for Bibliographic Records). The FRBR model represents the publication history of works by incorporating the concepts of Work, Expression, Manifestation and Item into a single record, rather than treating each publication separately. AustLit expanded the model with 'event modelling', showcasing creation events for Works, realisation events for Expressions, and embodiment events for Manifestations, along with attributes for Works, Expressions, Manifestations, Agents, Creation, Realisation and Manifestation events. It also introduced the concept of a Super Work and includes contextual records about individuals and organisations. AustLit adopted the FRBR model to serve as a comprehensive information hub for Australian writers and their works, offering enriched research-friendly data, documenting publishing histories, contextualising works, and establishing diverse relationships among authors, organisations, works, places, times, subjects, settings, and publishers.

== Coverage and activities ==
BlackWords logo

AustLit publishes biographical entries and brief essays on Australian writers, critics and storytellers, organisational histories relating to publishers, theatre companies and other arts organisations, arts and other cultural festivals, national and international awards, as well as works of fiction and criticism. It also covers the history and details of many Australian periodicals.

BlackWords, a separately published database within AustLit, covers all aspects of Indigenous Australian literature. Developed from an existing dataset in 2006 and launched in 2007, as of 2024 it indexes approximately 24,000 works by nearly 7000 authors and organisations. It also includes thousands of full-text works, including The BlackWords Essays, by Professor Anita Heiss, interviews with Indigenous Australian authors, and teaching and educational content.

AustLit has undertaken digitisation programs to create full-text versions of out-of-print and out-of-copyright literary works and critical articles about Australian literature, providing full-text access to samples of works published from 1795. It also provides access to full-text material hosted by other platforms, including Trove, libraries, public digitisation projects, and electronically published works. AustLit publishes new scholarly texts and datasets in digital format, such as AustLit: Literature of Tasmania, Beyond Goggles and Corsets: Australian Steampunk and Settler Colonial Literature.

The Australian Multicultural Writers subset includes thousands of writers whose cultural backgrounds are other than Anglo-Celtic. The South Australian Women Writers dataset contains thousands of records migrated from the Bibliography of South Australian Women Writers, compiled by Anne Chittleborough, Rick Hosking and Graham Tulloch of Flinders University and published electronically in 1999 by the State Library of South Australia. Added to AustLit in 2000, it continues to grow and Flinders University is primarily responsible for its development. The original dataset was completed in 2003.

=== Changes in coverage over time ===
Over time, some inclusion criteria have widened:

- In 2007, oral histories and life story works were included as part of the development of BlackWords.
- The Australian Popular Theatre dataset led to the inclusion of burlesque theatre works.
- The Colonial Newspapers and Magazines Project added advertisements and works by international authors.
- Coverage of scriptwriters in the film and television industry, along with associated production history, was extended in 2010.

=== Use in research ===
AustLit is a key information resource for the study of Australian literature and related fields. Due to its comprehensive record of Australian publishing history, AustLit serves as an important source of data for analysing and understanding Australian literary history.

Researchers use AustLit to develop datasets for specific fields of study. These projects include histories of books, magazines, and publishing; regionally-based surveys of publishing activity; and thematically-based subsets. Research into Australian popular and pulp fiction is supported, alongside research into theatre history, drama and multicultural writers.

== Usage ==
AustLit subscribers include research and educational institutions, and libraries, which provide access for their members and subscribers. Guest usage is limited to volunteers and access under special circumstances, with the general public having access to five pages per day.

Subscribers can electronically export data from AustLit. AustLit is archived by the National Library of Australia's PANDORA archive and the US Library of Congress has archived snapshots of the AustLit website since 2009.

AustLit's copyright is licensed under the Creative Commons License: Attribution-Noncommercial 3.0 Australia.
