= Albert Holt =

Australian Aboriginal elder in Queensland (1936–2026)

- Born: 1936; Barambah Aboriginal Settlement (now Cherbourg, Queensland)
- Died: 22 January 2026 (aged 89)
- Occupations: Aboriginal elder, author
- Known for: Advocating for young Indigenous Australians
- Notable work: Forcibly Removed (2001), Murri on a Mission - Gunnan Gunnan (2015)

Albert Holt (1936 – 22 January 2026), usually referred to as Uncle Albert Holt, was an Australian Aboriginal elder of the Bidjara people.

== Early life ==
Holt was born in 1936 on the Barambah Mission Reserve (now known as Cherbourg) after his family were forcibly removed from their home country near Springsure. His father was from the Bidjara nation while his mother was from the Yiman and Wakaman nations.

== Career ==
Throughout his life, Holt worked as an advocate for community justice, as well as for better education and health services for Australian First Nations people. He contributed to many advisory committees, parliamentary reviews, ministerial policy forums and educational working groups.

For two decades, Holt advocated for schools in Queensland to be more inclusive and lobbied them to incorporate Aboriginal history into their curriculum, while also encouraging students to maximise the educational opportunities which are available to them. Holt continued to regularly visit many schools to speak to students about Aboriginal culture and to promote reconciliation. As of 2019, Uncle Albert had been adopted by over eight local schools.

Holt founded the Hymba Yumba Community Hub, an independent indigenous school built at Springfield, Queensland, in 2011.

In 1995, Holt became the first senior liaison officer to work at the Queensland Police Service.

At the end of 2001, Holt retired from full-time work. However, he continued to be heavily involved in the community.

In 2006, Holt helped establish the Murri Court in Queensland, where magistrates are advised on sensitive cultural issues. He also became a member of the ministerial-appointed Queensland Indigenous Consultative Committee where he was invited to advise the government on issues concerning education for Aboriginal and Torres Strait Islander students.

Holt is credited with helping establish the Inala Indigenous Health Service and the Southern Queensland Centre of Excellence in Aboriginal and Torres Strait Islander Primary Health Care. He was also one of the founders of the Inala Family Education Centre.

== Death ==
Holt died on 22 January 2026 at the age of 89.

== Books ==
Holt released his autobiography, Forcibly Removed, in 2001. This was followed by Murri on a Mission - Gunnan Gunnan in 2015.

In 2017, Holt, Everald Compton and Henry Palaszczuk contributed to Sophie Church's book Goondeen: Understanding Australia in which they each wrote about their personal stories and on what type of country they believe Australia is.

== Recognition ==
A community housing development in Inala, Queensland, was named Uncle Albert Holt Terraces.

Holt was named as the Male Elder of the Year at the 2005 NAIDOC Awards and received the Premier's Senior Citizen Volunteer Award in 2007.

In 2018, Holt received an honorary doctorate from the World Indigenous Nations University. The same year a building at the Hymba Yumba Community Hub was named in his honour.

In October 2017, Queensland premier Annastacia Palaszczuk announced that Holt had been selected as a baton bearer for the Queen's Baton Relay held prior to the 2018 Commonwealth Games on the Gold Coast.

In 2022, Holt was named as a Queensland Great.
