= Too Much Lip =

2018 novel by Melissa Lucashenko

- First edition
- Author: Melissa Lucashenko
- Language: English, Aboriginal Australian English
- Genre: novel
- Publisher: University of Queensland Press, Australia
- Publication date: 2018
- Publication place: Australia
- Media type: Print (Paperback)
- ISBN: 9780702261046
- Preceded by: Mullumbimby (novel)

Too Much Lip (2018) is a novel by Australian author Melissa Lucashenko. It was shortlisted for the 2019 Victorian Premier's Literary Award for Indigenous Writing and the Stella Award. It was the winner of the 2019 Miles Franklin Award.

== Plot summary ==
Protagonist Kerry returns to her hometown of Durrongo on a stolen Harley to bid farewell to her dying grandfather. A fugitive with warrants out for her arrest, she does not intend to stay in town for long. However she soon becomes embroiled in dramas with regards to her family, her local family history, and the overdevelopment of the local community, and unexpectedly finds love with a local dugai (white man) named Steve.

== Awards ==
- Stella Prize - 2019 - Shortlisted
- Australian Book Industry Awards - 2019 - Longlisted
- Miles Franklin Award - 2019 - Winner
- Queensland Literary Awards - Courier Mail People’s Choice Award - 2019 - Shortlisted
- Queensland Literary Awards - Queensland Premier's Award for a work of State Significance - 2019 - Shortlisted
- Queensland Literary Awards - The University of Queensland Fiction Book Award - 2019 - Shortlisted
- Prime Minister's Literary Awards - 2019 - Shortlisted
- Victorian Premier's Literary Award for Indigenous Writing - Shortlisted
- Voss Literary Prize - 2019 - Shortlisted
