= Lycée-Collège d'État Émile Letournel =

Junior and senior high school on the island of Saint-Pierre

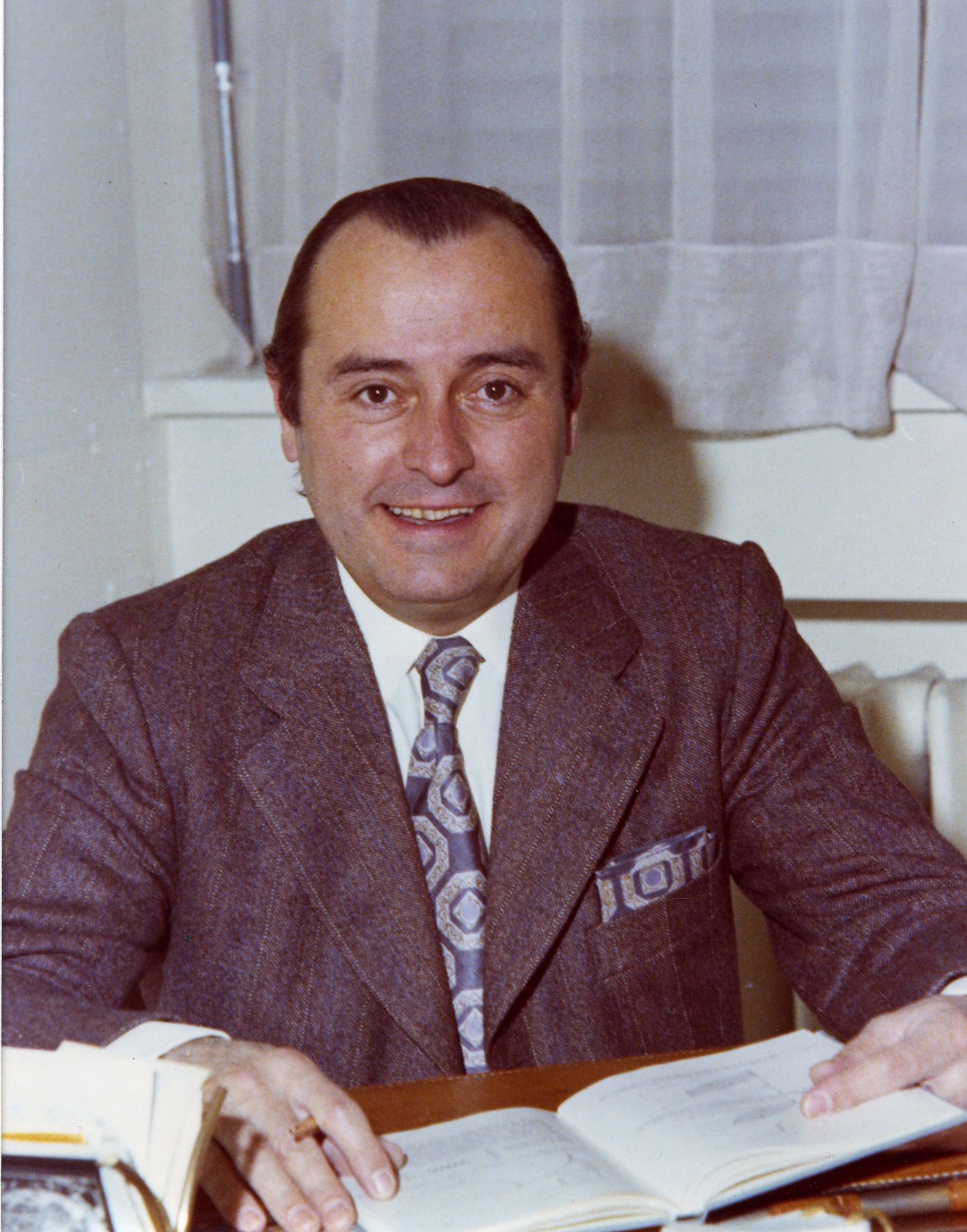
- Émile Letournel, after whom the school is named

Location
- Saint-Pierre, Saint Pierre and Miquelon; France
- Coordinates: 46°46′52.9″N 56°10′31.07″W

Information
- Enrollment: 394 (2016-17)
- Website: pronotes.lycee-letournel.fr

Lycée-Collège d'État Émile Letournel (French pronunciation: [lise kɔlɛʒ deta emil lətuʁnɛl]) is a combined junior high school and senior high school/sixth-form college on the island of Saint-Pierre, in Saint Pierre and Miquelon. It was named after a famous French orthopaedic surgeon, Émile Letournel (1927-1994), native of Saint-Pierre.

As of the 2016–2017 school year the institution had 161 junior high school students, 119 general senior high/sixth-form students, and 114 vocational high school students, totalling 394 students.

Each year since 2009, the school has awarded a literary prize known as the Récit de l'Ailleurs (meaning "story from elsewhere"), in which a jury of students vote for their favourite book from somewhere other than France.
