= Life story work =

Social work intervention with children and adults

Life story work is a social work intervention with children and adults designed to recognise their past, present, and future. It is prominently used with children who will be adopted, and older adults as part of reminiscence therapies. Life story books are often incorporated into this work to give a visual aid and reminder of important events or feelings.

== Origins ==
Life story work as a concept has dated back to at least the 1960s, possibly further. The application of the concept to children in foster care and adoption was discussed in academia from the early 1980s onward. Life story work is well documented in the UK and Australia and has been incorporated into UK Adoption legislation. More recently it has been used in Eastern Europe.

== Preparing and planning ==
Social workers often take responsibility for ensuring children who are expected to be adopted or to be in long-term care have a life story book. Social workers may hold the most factual information about the child's background. Day-to-day carers such as; Foster Carers, Residential Support Workers or Adoptive Parents may also offer informal life story work. They may have the information about the day-to-day events in the child's life, their milestones and achievements.

Birth Parents are a critical part of the life story work with adopted children as they can offer information to construct a family tree and provide pictures or descriptions of family members.

Some suggest that life story work can be completed by any adult who is able and willing to spend time with the child and build a trusting relationship. However, some feel that some professionals such as student social workers, trainees and foster carers should not be encouraged to complete the life story work as they may not have the experience, training or ability to support the child with life story work over a long enough period of time. The person's needs must be taken into account regarding the gender, ethnicity, religion or culture of the adult assisting with the life story work.

== Techniques ==
=== Life story books ===
Life story books have been a part of adoption social workers' practice for over 30 years; though the quality of them has varied. It should take around 12 months to complete it though it may need to be updated as the child's understanding develops. Life story work is distinct from life story books, the process of life story work is to assist the person to understand and internalise the feelings associated with their past. However, a life story book does not need to involve the person and can be done by others, this is especially the case when done by social workers before placing a child for adoption. Rees & Goldberg state that a life story book should not include professional reports, later life letters, structured chronology (though this could be recorded in another, more child friendly, format), photo album and should not be an extension of the foster carer's memory book. However, life story books can often be seen as complementary or as an end product to life story work. A life story book is a system of recording information to answer the questions the participant may have in the future. It is an overview of a person's life to help them recall memories and understand their past. A child who does not fully understand their history is at risk of developing an imagined story of fictional family members leading to a misplaced sense of identity as they mature. Often, life story books are written from the perspective of the Past-Present though it has been suggested that writing it in this way causes the child anxiety as past issues may be too painful to come to terms with. Therefore, it has been suggested that a new approach: ‘Present – Past – Present – Future’ allows the child to feel that their life with their current family is secure and symbolically encourages the child to feel contained by their family.

=== Interactive approach ===
It has been identified that ICT can assist with the presentation of life story work such as amending colour schemes to make it personal to the individual, and correcting spelling or grammatical errors. Hardware peripherals such as scanners, digital cameras and printers are also useful. Computer programmes have been developed to complete life story work with children in a way which they feel comfortable and do not find threatening.

=== Digital life story work ===
The importance of digital technologies and digital media in the lives of children and young people has seen a growth in interest of the ability of these technologies to support self-reflection and build narrative coherence. In seeking to make the benefits of conventional life story work accessible to adolescents, Hammond and Cooper integrate the ideas of narrative psychology and build upon established approaches of undertaking life story work with younger children. Recognising that adolescents communicate differently than younger children, Hammond and Cooper incorporate a range of accessible digital technologies to provide interactive and practical activities which aim to support practitioners to empower adolescents to take the lead in the creation of, and reflection upon, their own autobiographical narratives.

=== Story-telling ===
Creating stories for children that can create a link between their lives and behaviour and that of a fiction character can develop their understanding of why they think and feel the way they do.

== Service user groups ==
=== Adoption ===
The Children's Rights Director in England found that 71% of adopted children thought it was important to know about their lives before adoption. Specific questions that these children wanted answers to included why they were adopted and why they could not stay with birth families.

The Adoption and Children Act 2002 outlines the Local Authorities' and Adoption Agencies' expectations to provide information regarding individual's history upon request. Guidance relating to this Act specifically mentions Life Story Work to help them 'explore and understand their early history and life before their adoption'.

=== Fostering ===
Some Local Authorities in the UK have developed procedures which outline the need for all children who are Looked After to have life story work completed with them; usually in conjunction with the social worker and foster carer. Much of the foster carer's role is to collect items for the child's memory box or book and to encourage the child to participate.

=== Dementia ===
Life story work is used for people with dementia to support them to be able to tell the story of their life and to create visual tools to help their memories of past events. Present and future goals or plans should be identified. Life story work should identify a person's achievements throughout life so this can allow the person with dementia to feel proud of themselves. Life story work has been linked to person centred/individualised care of people with dementia Rather than focusing on a person's dementia or the benefits of capturing information before it is forgotten, it gets people thinking about the fact that they may actually have interesting stories to tell.

It has also been found to be beneficial as a therapeutic tool for family members to assist in reviewing the person's life and enabling them to remember the person prior to the onset of dementia. Staff and carers of the person may also find it a useful tool to help them better care for a person. Furthermore, research shows that families feel reassured about staff care after life story work has been completed. It has also been identified to be a fun and interesting activity to do with dementia patients. National UK guidelines make particular reference to staff being able to learn about individuals' life stories.

=== Learning disabilities ===
An Australian study of ex-prisoners with 'intellectual' disabilities suggested that life story work may be beneficial to allow this group of people to better communicate their experiences. It has also been identified as a tool to promoting self-advocacy.

== Criticism of life story work ==
Research conducted within in-patient older adult mental health wards found that there was sometimes a shortage of qualified staff to complete the work and a reluctance to get involved due to other commitments and responsibilities. There were also limits to the amount of time they had available to complete the work and access to resources such as computers and scanners was identified as a problem.
