= Heat and Light =

2014 book by Ellen van Neerven

- Author: Ellen van Neerven
- Genre: Fiction
- Publisher: University of Queensland Press
- Publication date: 27 August 2014
- Publication place: Australia
- Pages: 232
- ISBN: 9780702253218

Heat and Light is a 2014 work of fiction by First Nations Australian author Ellen van Neerven. The book contains three stories: "Heat", "Water", and "Light". It was the winner of the Indigenous Writers Prize at the 2016 New South Wales Premier's Literary Awards and was shortlisted for the 2015 Stella Prize.

== Reception ==
Heat and Light received generally positive reviews, with reviewers praising the work as an impressive debut from a promising young writer. In Queensland Review, Jessica Gildersleeve wrote that the book contained innovative narrative experiments and that it spoke to themes of marginalisation and loss. In Southerly, Kate Livett wrote that the book blurred the traditional line between novel and short story collection and that it was written with impressive confidence and maturity. A. S. Patrić wrote in Australian Book Review that the work was fresh and imaginative, but that its stories were uneven in quality and did not form a cohesive whole.

== Awards ==
Awards for Heat and Light
| Year | Award | Category | Result | Ref. |
|---|---|---|---|---|
| 2016 | New South Wales Premier's Literary Awards | Indigenous Writers Prize | Won | |
| 2016 | Victorian Premier's Literary Awards | Prize for Indigenous Writing | Shortlisted | |
| 2015 | Nita Kibble Literary Awards | Dobbie Literary Award | Won | |
| 2015 | The Sydney Morning Herald Best Young Australian Novelists | — | Won | |
| 2015 | Queensland Literary Awards | Queensland Premier’s Award for a Work of State Significance | Shortlisted | |
| 2015 | Readings Prize | New Australian Fiction Prize | Shortlisted | |
| 2015 | New South Wales Premier's Literary Awards | Glenda Adams Award for New Writing | Shortlisted | |
| 2015 | Stella Prize | — | Shortlisted | |
| 2013 | Queensland Literary Awards | David Unaipon Award | Won | |
