= Journal of Criminology =

- Discipline: Criminology
- Language: English
- Edited by: Anna Stewart and Philip Stenning

Publication details
- Former names: Australian and New Zealand Journal of Criminology
- History: 1968–present
- Publisher: SAGE Publications
- Frequency: Triannually
- Impact factor: 0.651 (2013)

Standard abbreviations
- ISO 4: J. Criminol.

Indexing
- ISSN: 0004-8658 (print); 1837-9273 (web)
- LCCN: 68130936

Links
- Journal homepage; Online access; Online archive

The Journal of Criminology is a triannual peer-reviewed academic journal that covers criminological research. The journal was established in 1968 and is the principal journal of the Australian and New Zealand Society of Criminology. For the first 53 volumes, it was published under the title Australian and New Zealand Journal of Criminology, before changing its title in March 2021.

== Abstracting and indexing ==
The Australian and New Zealand Journal of Criminology is abstracted and indexed in Scopus and the Social Sciences Citation Index. According to the Journal Citation Reports, its 2013 impact factor is 0.651, ranking it 35th out of 52 journals in the category "Criminology and Penology".
