= Otherlands (book) =

2022 book by Thomas Halliday

Otherlands: A Journey Through Earth's Extinct Worlds
- Author: Thomas Halliday
- Language: English
- Subject: Palaeontology, evolutionary biology, geology, topography
- Genres: Nonfiction
- Publisher: Allen Lane, London; Random House, New York; Penguin Canada, Toronto
- Publication date: February 1, 2022
- Publication place: United Kingdom
- Pages: 416
- ISBN: 9780593132883

Otherlands: A Journey Through Earth's Extinct Worlds is a nonfiction book about palaeontology written by Thomas Halliday, a British palaeontologist. He goes as far back in time as approximately 555 million years ago. The book was simultaneously published in English by Allen Lane (UK and Commonwealth), Random House (USA and Philippines), and Penguin Canada (Canada) in February 2022.

== Summary ==
Halliday uncovers for the lay public the vast changes in fauna, flora, topography, and climate over the past 555 million years. He observes cyclical changes, including cycles of ice ages and climate warming, and periods of mass extinction followed by periods of mass flourishing. However at each renewal, life takes on completely different forms that are adapted to the new environmental conditions. Thus, life goes on but species do not. Looking forward on a paleontology time scale, humankind will inevitably go extinct.

== Period covered ==
Halliday starts the first chapter by going back in time about 20,000 years ago. And, through the next 15 chapters he goes further back in time to approximately 555 million years ago. Each chapter covers a specific geological time period and part of the world. Such time and place most often represent key turning points in the paleontological history of life on Earth.

The table below provides more detailed information about the specific locations and periods covered.

Locations and times described in the chapters of Otherlands
Chapter	Location	Time	Epoch	Period
1	Northern Plain, Alaska	20,000 years ago	Pleistocene	Quaternary
2	Kanapoi, Kenya	4 million years ago	Pliocene	Neogene
3	Gargano, Italy	5 million years ago	Miocene	Neogene
4	Tinguiririca, Chile	32 million years ago	Oligocene	Palaeogene
5	Seymour Island, Antarctica	41 million years ago	Eocene	Palaeogene
6	Hell Creek, Montana, USA	66 million years ago	Palaeocene	Palaeogene
7	Yixian, Liaoning, China	125 million years ago	(not stated in text)	Cretaceous
8	Swabia, Germany	155million years ago	(not stated in text)	Jurassic
9	Madygen, Kyrgyzstan	225 million years ago	(not stated in text)	Triassic
10	Moradi, Nigeria	253 million years ago	(not stated in text)	Permian
11	Mazon Creek, Illinois, USA	309 million years ago	(not stated in text)	Carboniferous
12	Rhynie, Scotland	407 million years ago	(not stated in text)	Devonian
13	Yaman-Kasy, Russia	435 million years ago	(not stated in text)	Silurian
14	Soom, South Africa	444 million years ago	(not stated in text)	Ordovician
15	Chengjian, Yunnan, China	520 million years ago	(not stated in text)	Cambrian
16	Ediacara Hills, Australia	555 million years ago	(not stated in text)	Ediacaran

== "Otherlands" & Thomas Halliday on climate change ==
Halliday indicates that humankind bears a huge responsibility in the trajectory of our contemporary climate change. Today's atmosphere has a similar composition as during the Oligocene (an epoch ranging from 34 million to 23 million years ago during the Palaeogene period shown within the table above). However, by the end of this century, the Intergovernmental Panel for Climate Change (IPCC) projects that the level of CO_{2} in the atmosphere could reach levels of CO_{2} similar to the Eocene (the preceding epoch to the Oligocene ranging from 56 million to 34 million years ago). Temperature ranges during the Eocene were a lot higher than contemporary ones. And, the only way to reduce this prospective increase in temperature is by decreasing CO_{2} emissions and flatten the upward trajectory of atmospheric CO_{2} concentration.

By studying the distant past, Halliday can envision prospective climate change scenarios. Depending on how much CO_{2} is emitted, the Earth could very well be heading towards Eocene-temperature levels far faster than any underlying long term paleontology-cycle would suggest.

== Author's background ==
Halliday is a paleontologist and evolutionary biologist. He has held research positions at University College London and the University of Birmingham, and has been part of paleontology field crews in Argentina and India. He holds a Leverhulme Early Career Fellowship at the University of Birmingham, and is a scientific associate of the Natural History Museum. His research combines theoretical and real data to investigate long-term patterns in the fossil record, particularly in mammals. He was the winner of the Linnean Society's John C. Marsden Medal in 2016 and the Hugh Miller Writing Competition in 2018.

"Otherlands" is Halliday's first book.

Halliday has published numerous scientific papers often related to the explanatory narrative within "Otherlands." The book itself includes 45 pages of scientific references (between 20 and 30 references per chapter).

== Book reception ==
This book was well received with positive reviews from nonfiction book critics. It was shortlisted for the 2022 Wainwright Prize.

== See also ==
- List of popular science books on evolution
