= Kate Howarth (writer) =

Aboriginal Australian writer

- Born: Thomas Michael Keneally; 1950 (age 75–76); Sydney, New South Wales, Australia
- Occupation: Writer
- Writing career
- Notable awards: 2010 The Age Book of the Year Awards for Non-Fiction

Kate Howarth (born 1950, Sydney) is an Aboriginal Australian writer whose memoir Ten Hail Marys was published by the University of Queensland Press in 2010. The sequel, Settling Day, was published in 2015.

== Life and work ==
Howarth was raised by her grandmother and other relatives in Darlinghurst and rural New South Wales She left school at age 14, became pregnant at the age of 15, and went to the St Margaret's Home for Unwed Mothers in Sydney. After giving birth, she resisted giving her son up for adoption and became one of the few women to leave the institution with her child. The story of the first 17 years of her life is recounted in her memoir Ten Hail Marys, which challenged evidence taken at a Parliamentary inquiry into adoption practices in N.S.W. from 1950 to 1998. Reviewers considered it "Memoir at its confronting, revealing best", which has a "complicated exploration of oppression and survival that ... provokes new understanding of the impacts of institutional intrusion on women and children through the potent testimony of life writing".

1977 - 1989 Kate Howarth aka Kay Norman, was a Director of Manpower Personnel. Manpower launched the first word processing training center in Sydney in 1984, which became the precursor for Manpower's IT Divisions operating across Australia.

1989 - 1992 Kate owned high end bridal wear and lingerie business, Simply Stunning, where she designed bridal gowns and evening wear.

1995 - 1999 Kate purpose built a restaurant, Aunty Flos, in Mittagong with a drive-thru gourmet take away. A sell out, if Kate didn't fall from a train in 1999, that forced the closure of the business.

2008 Kate was shortlisted for the David Uniapon Award for an unpublished manuscript.

2010 -31 March, Kate's first book 10 Hail Marys, was published and went on to win the Age Non Fiction Book 2010 and was shortlisted for the Victorian Literary Prize. 10 Hail Marys exposed what is now referred to as forces adoption practices and she was called to give evidence at the NSW State Parliament during the two-year National Senate inquiry into adoption practices.

2015 the sequel to Ten Hail Marys, Settling Day, was published. It takes up where the previous book leaves off, and follows Howarth's path from a homeless teen, through marriages and a career. Reviewers found it a "compelling read[] that document[s] important contemporary struggles for human liberation", and concluded, "Her voice remains, as ever, invaluable". Howarth has been interviewed both within Australia and internationally about her books and the social issues they raise.

Since publication Kate has conducted a number of memoir writing workshops, that include the Varuna Writers House in Katoomba and the South Arts in the Bega Valley.

Kate has appeared at writers' festivals across the country.

== Books ==
- Ten Hail Marys (2010) ISBN 978-0-7022-3770-6
- Settling Day (2015) ISBN 978-0-7022-5005-7

== Awards and nominations ==
- 2008 - Queensland Premier's Literary Awards (David Unaipon Award) - shortlisted for Ten Hail Marys
- 2010 - Victorian Premier's Literary Award - shortlisted for Indigenous Writing Award
- 2010 - The Age Book of the Year non-fiction winner
