= Melissa Lucashenko =

Indigenous Australian writer

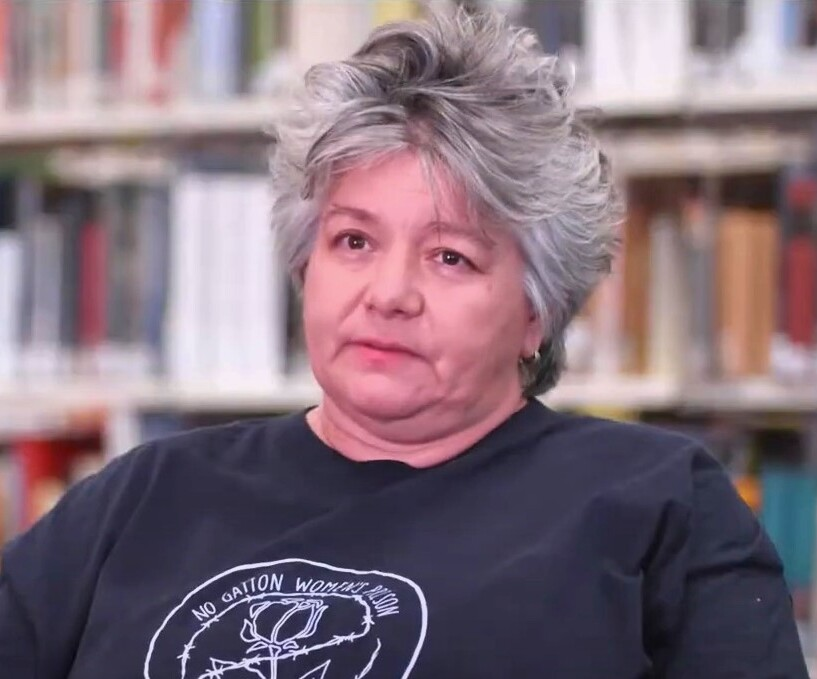
- Lucashenko for Griffith Review in 2019
- Born: 1967 (age 58–59); Brisbane, Queensland, Australia
- Occupation: Writer
- Writing career
- Genres: Literary fiction; young adult literature
- Notable work: Too Much Lip
- Notable awards: Miles Franklin Award (2019)
- Website: melissa-lucashenko.com

Melissa Lucashenko is an Indigenous Australian writer of literary fiction and young adult literature.

In 2013 at the Walkley Awards, she won the Long Feature Writing Award for her piece "Sinking Below Sight: Down and Out in Brisbane and Logan". In 2019, she won the Miles Franklin Award for Too Much Lip.

== Early life and education ==
Melissa Lucashenko was born in 1967 in Brisbane, Australia. She is of Bundjalung and Ukrainian heritage. She graduated from Griffith University in 1990 with a degree in public policy.

In 1992, she was a founding member of Sisters Inside, an organisation that supports women and girls in prison.

== Writing career ==
She has said that when she began writing seriously "there was still a glaring hole in Australian literature," with almost no prominent Aboriginal voices and with very few outlets publishing the work of Aboriginal writers.

=== Early work ===
Lucashenko's first work to be published was the novel Steam Pigs (1997), which won the Dobbie Literary Award for debut Australian women writers. It was also shortlisted for the NSW Premier's Literary Awards Christina Stead Prize for and the Commonwealth Writers' Prize for Best First Book (South East Asia and South Pacific).

In 1998, she released the novel Killing Darcy, which won the Royal Blind Society's Talking Book Award for young readers (also referred to as the Aurora Prize). (Note: So far no primary sources to establish exactly what this award was.) It was also a finalist for the 1998 Aurealis Award for Best Young Adult Novel and longlisted for the 1998 James Tiptree Award.

In 1999 her third novel, Hard Yards, was published. It was a finalist for the 1999 NSW Premier's Literary Awards and the 2001 Courier-Mail Book of the Year Award. In 2002 her fourth novel Too Flash, written for young adults, was published.

=== Critical success ===
Lucashenko's fifth novel, Mullumbimby, won the Queensland Literary Award for Fiction Book in 2013 and the Victorian Premier's Literary Award for Indigenous Writing in 2014, as well as being nominated for several other awards. In 2015 it was longlisted for the Dublin Literary Award.

In 2019 her sixth novel Too Much Lip won the Miles Franklin Award and Queensland Premier's Award for a Work of State Significance. The novel was also shortlisted for the Stella Prize. Judges called it "a fearless, searing and unvarnished portrait of generational trauma cut through with acerbic humour." Cenozoic Pictures optioned Too Much Lip for a screen adaptation, with Lucashenko as a co-writer and co-creator alongside Cenozoic's Veronica Gleeson.

Her seventh novel, Edenglassie, was released in 2023 and won the Queensland Premier's Award for a Work of State Significance for the second time, as well as the Victorian Premier's Prize for Fiction. In late 2024, it won the ARA Historical Novel Prize, being commended for capturing "the brutal realities of colonisation while celebrating the resilience of Indigenous cultures."

=== Non-fiction writing ===
Lucashenko is also an essayist, winning the 2013 Long Feature Writing Walkley Award for "Sinking below sight: Down and out in Brisbane and Logan". Speaking about this essay, Lucashenko said that she was partly informed by her studies in public policy.

== Personal life ==
Lucashenko moved with her husband and daughter back to the Aboriginal lands in New South Wales where her great-grandmother said she was from. She subsequently divorced from her husband. She has spoken publicly about her daughter's mental illness.

== Nominations and awards ==
| Year | Work | Award | Category | Result | Ref |
|---|---|---|---|---|---|
| 1997 | Steam Pigs | Commonwealth Writers' Prize | First Book (South East Asia and South Pacific) | Shortlisted | |
| 1997 | Steam Pigs | New South Wales Premier's Literary Awards | Christina Stead Prize for Fiction | Shortlisted | |
| 1998 | Steam Pigs | Nita Kibble Literary Awards | Dobbie Literary Award | Won | |
| 1998 | Killing Darcy | Aurealis Award | Young Adult Novel | Shortlisted | |
| 1998 | Killing Darcy | Royal Blind Society Aurora Prize | Talking Book for Young Readers | Won | |
| 1999 | Killing Darcy | James Tiptree Jr. Award | — | Longlisted | |
| 1999 | Hard Yards | New South Wales Premier's Literary Awards | — | Shortlisted | |
| 2001 | Hard Yards | Courier-Mail Book of the Year | — | Nominated | |
| 2013 | "Sinking Below Sight" | Walkley Award | Feature Writing Long (over 4000 words) | Won | |
| 2013 | Mullumbimby | Queensland Literary Awards | Deloitte Fiction Book Award | Won | |
| 2014 | Mullumbimby | Miles Franklin Award | — | Longlisted | |
| 2014 | Mullumbimby | Nita Kibble Literary Awards | Nita B Kibble Literary Award | Shortlisted | |
| 2014 | Mullumbimby | Stella Prize | — | Longlisted | |
| 2014 | Mullumbimby | Victorian Premier's Literary Award | Indigenous Writing | Won | |
| 2015 | Mullumbimby | International Dublin Literary Award | — | Longlisted | |
| 2019 | Too Much Lip | Australian Book Industry Awards | — | Longlisted | |
| 2019 | Too Much Lip | Miles Franklin Award | — | Won | |
| 2019 | Too Much Lip | Queensland Literary Awards | Queensland Premier's Award for a Work of State Significance | Won | |
| 2019 | Too Much Lip | Queensland Literary Awards | The University of Queensland Fiction Book Award | Shortlisted | |
| 2019 | Too Much Lip | Stella Prize | — | Shortlisted | |
| 2019 | Too Much Lip | Victorian Premier's Literary Award | Indigenous Writing | Shortlisted | |
| 2020 | Too Much Lip | New South Wales Premier's Literary Awards | Indigenous Writers' Prize | Shortlisted | |
| 2020 | Too Much Lip | International Dublin Literary Award | — | Longlisted | |
| 2024 | Edenglassie | Australian Book Industry Awards | Small Publishers' Adult Book of the Year | Won | |
| 2024 | Edenglassie | ARA Historical Novel Prize | — | Won | |
| 2024 | Edenglassie | Barbara Jefferis Award | — | Shortlisted | |
| 2024 | Edenglassie | Colin Roderick Award | — | Won | |
| 2024 | Edenglassie | Indie Book Awards | Fiction | Won | |
| 2024 | Edenglassie | Miles Franklin Award | — | Longlisted | |
| 2024 | Edenglassie | Nib Literary Award | — | Won | |
| 2024 | Edenglassie | Prime Minister's Literary Awards | Fiction | Shortlisted | |
| 2024 | Edenglassie | Queensland Literary Awards | Queensland Premier's Award for a Work of State Significance | Won | |
| 2024 | Edenglassie | Queensland Literary Awards | Fiction Book Award | Shortlisted | |
| 2024 | Edenglassie | Stella Prize | — | Longlisted | |
| 2024 | Edenglassie | Victorian Premier's Literary Award | Fiction | Won | |
| 2025 | Edenglassie | International Dublin Literary Award | — | Longlisted | |
| 2025 | Edenglassie | New South Wales Premier's Literary Awards | Christina Stead Prize for Fiction | Shortlisted | |
| 2026 | Edenglassie | Walter Scott Prize | — | Longlisted | |

== Bibliography ==
=== Novels ===
- —— (1997). Steam Pigs. University of Queensland Press. ISBN 9780702229350.
- —— (1999). Hard Yards. University of Queensland Press. ISBN 9780702230806.
- —— (2002). Uptown Girl. University of Queensland Press. ISBN 9780702233340.
- —— (2013). Mullumbimby. University of Queensland Press. ISBN 9780702239199.
- —— (2018). Too Much Lip. University of Queensland Press. ISBN 9780702259968.
- —— (2023). Edenglassie. University of Queensland Press. ISBN 9780702266126.

==== YA Novels ====
- —— (1998). Killing Darcy. University of Queensland Press. ISBN 9780702230417.
- —— (2002). Too Flash. IAD Press. ISBN 9781864650488.

=== Essays ===
- —— (2005). "Who Let the Dogs Out?". Griffith Review.
- —— (2004). "Not Quite White in the Head". Griffith Review (2).
- —— (2005). "Our Bodies". Griffith Review (4).
- —— (2005). "Globalisation, Kimberley Style". Griffith Review (6).
- —— (2007). "How Green Is My Valley?". Griffith Review (12).
- —— (2009). "On the Same Page, Right?". Griffith Review (26).
- —— (2009). "The Silent Majority". Griffith Review (26).
- —— (2013). "Sinking Below Sight". Griffith Review (41).
- —— (2013). "History's Footnote, or, a Wolvi Incident". In Jane Caro (ed.). Destroying the Joint: Why Women Have to Change the World. University of Queensland Press. ISBN 9780702249907.
- —— (2020). "It's No Accident That Blak Australia Has Survived the Pandemic So Well. Survival Is What We Do". The Guardian.
