= Jeanine Leane =

Wiradjuri Aboriginal poet and academic (born 1961)

- Born: 1961 (age 64–65); Wagga Wagga, New South Wales
- Education: University of New England, Armidale; University of Canberra
- Occupations: Poet, activist, and academic
- Awards: David Harold Tribe Poetry Award

Jeanine Leane (born 1961) is a Wiradjuri poet and activist from southwest New South Wales. She is an associate professor in creative writing at the University of Melbourne.

== Biography ==
Jeanine Leane was born in Wagga Wagga, New South Wales, Australia. She is a member of the Wiradjuri nation.

She earned her BA in Literature and History from University of New England, Armidale in 1983. She earned a Graduate Diploma of Education from University of Canberra in 1984.

In 2011, she earned a doctorate in Australian literature and Aboriginal representation. Her research not only explored Aboriginal narratives, but examined white settler icons to give an Aboriginal perspective and critique.

She had a long career as a secondary school teacher before becoming faculty at University of Melbourne. She worked with Aboriginal students to support them entering university programs. She also taught indigenous education to non-Aboriginal student teachers.

She was an Indigenous Research Fellow at the Australian Institute of Aboriginal and Torres Strait Islander Studies. Leane was also a post-doctoral fellow in the Australian Centre for Indigenous History at the Australian National University.

=== Literary career ===
Leane's poetry and creative works explore Aboriginal perspectives and settler presentations in literature, and Aboriginal writing "as an important site of personal, national and collective memory." She has published three volumes of poetry and fiction, and numerous other publications including poetry, book reviews, and interviews.

Even her fictional book, Purple Threads, is a fictionalization of the women in her life including her mother, grandmother, and aunts.

== Published works ==
- Dark Secrets After Dreaming: AD 1887-1961 (poetry)
- Purple Threads (fiction)
- Walk Back Over (poetry)
- Guwayu (poetry, edited volume)
- gawimarra gathering (poetry)

== Recognition ==
In 2010, her first volume of poetry Dark Secrets After Dreaming: AD 1887-1961 won the Scanlon Prize for Indigenous Poetry from the Australian Poets' Union. Her novel Purple Threads won the David Unaipon Award.

In 2013, she received an Australian Research Council Discovery Indigenous Fellowship. In 2020, she received a JUNCTURE fellowship.

- 2017, University of Canberra Aboriginal and Torres Strait Islander Poetry Prize
- 2017, Oodergroo Noonucal Prize for Poetry
- 2019, Oodergroo Noonucal Prize for Poetry
- 2019, Red Room Poetry Fellowship for "Voicing the Unsettled Space: Rewriting the Colonial Mythscape"
- 2020, Discovery Indigenous Award
- 2023, David Harold Tribe Award for Poetry for "Water Under the Bridge"
- 2025, Victorian Premier's Prize for Poetry for gawimarra gathering
