= Top 100 Books of the 21st Century =

2025 Australian radio book countdown

The Top 100 Books of the 21st Century was a countdown by Australian radio station ABC Radio National over 18 and 19 October 2025. It was the first annual countdown by the nationwide public service radio network. According To Variety, it ”followed a similar structure to triple j’s highly successful Hottest 100 countdowns of music”.

Australian author Trent Dalton's semi-autobiographical novel Boy Swallows Universe was voted into number one, while Australian authors Anna Funder and Geraldine Brooks scored the most entries, with three.

== Background ==
In May 2025, Radio National announced a new annual countdown called the Top 100 Books, inspired by Triple J's Hottest 100 music countdown. Each year will feature a different theme, with the inaugural edition focusing on the Top 100 Books of the 21st Century. All books published between 1 January 2000 and 31 August 2025 were eligible for voting, regardless of genre.

== Full list ==
Note: Australian authors

#	Book	Author	Year	Country of origin
1	Boy Swallows Universe	Trent Dalton	2018	Australia
2	The Book Thief	Markus Zusak	2005	Australia
3	A Gentleman in Moscow	Amor Towles	2016	United States
4	All The Light We Cannot See	Anthony Doerr	2014	United States
5	Lessons in Chemistry	Bonnie Garmus	2022	United States
6	Burial Rites	Hannah Kent	2013	Australia
7	The Dictionary of Lost Words	Pip Williams	2020	Australia
8	Demon Copperhead	Barbara Kingsolver	2022	United States
9	A Little Life	Hanya Yanagihara	2015	United States
10	Wolf Hall	Hilary Mantel	2009	United Kingdom
11	Small Things Like These	Claire Keegan	2021	Ireland
12	Where the Crawdads Sing	Delia Owens	2018	United States
13	The Narrow Road to the Deep North	Richard Flanagan	2013	Australia
14	Eleanor Oliphant is Completely Fine	Gail Honeyman	2017	United Kingdom
15	Year of Wonders	Geraldine Brooks	2001	Australia/United States
16	Still Life	Sarah Winman	2021	United Kingdom
17	Wifedom	Anna Funder	2023	Australia
18	Dark Emu	Bruce Pascoe	2014	Australia
19	The Road	Cormac McCarthy	2006	United States
20	The Secret River	Kate Grenville	2005	Australia
21	Atonement	Ian McEwan	2001	United Kingdom
22	The Kite Runner	Khaled Hosseini	2003	Afghanistan/United States
23	Tomorrow, and Tomorrow, and Tomorrow	Gabrielle Zevin	2022	United States
24	Jasper Jones	Craig Silvey	2009	Australia
25	Honeybee	Craig Silvey	2020	Australia
26	The Hunger Games	Suzanne Collins	2008	United States
27	My Brilliant Friend	Elena Ferrante	2011	Italy
28	The Dry	Jane Harper	2016	Australia
29	Lola in the Mirror	Trent Dalton	2023	Australia
30	Stasiland	Anna Funder	2002	Australia
31	The Goldfinch	Donna Tartt	2013	United States
32	Normal People	Sally Rooney	2018	Ireland
33	Pachinko	Min Jin Lee	2017	United States/South Korea
34	Never Let Me Go	Kazuo Ishiguro	2005	United Kingdom/Japan
35	Olive Kitteridge	Elizabeth Strout	2008	United States
36	The Thursday Murder Club	Richard Osman	2020	United Kingdom
37	The Slap	Christos Tsiolkas	2008	Australia
38	Breath	Tim Winton	2008	Australia
39	Hamnet	Maggie O'Farrell	2020	United Kingdom
40	Dirt Music	Tim Winton	2002	Australia
41	Shuggie Bain	Douglas Stuart	2020	United Kingdom/United States
42	A Man Called Ove	Fredrik Backman	2012	Sweden
43	All That I Am	Anna Funder	2011	Australia
44	Limberlost	Robbie Arnott	2022	Australia
45	The Time Traveler's Wife	Audrey Niffenegger	2003	United States
46	Horse	Geraldine Brooks	2022	Australia/United States
47	Harry Potter and the Goblet of Fire	J. K. Rowling	2000	United Kingdom
48	Life of Pi	Yann Martel	2001	Canada
49	A Thousand Splendid Suns	Khaled Hosseini	2007	Afghanistan/United States
50	The Lovely Bones	Alice Sebold	2002	United States
51	The Seven Husbands of Evelyn Hugo	Taylor Jenkins Reid	2017	United States
52	The Girl with the Dragon Tattoo	Stieg Larsson	2005	Sweden
53	Prophet Song	Paul Lynch	2023	Ireland
54	The Rosie Project	Graeme Simsion	2013	Australia
55	Girl, Woman, Other	Bernardine Evaristo	2018	United Kingdom
56	The No. 1 Ladies' Detective Agency	Alexander McCall Smith	2003	United Kingdom/Zimbabwe
57	Sapiens	Yuval Noah Harari	2014	Israel
58	James	Percival Everett	2024	United States
59	The Curious Incident of the Dog in the Night-Time	Mark Haddon	2003	United Kingdom
60	The Song of Achilles	Madeline Miller	2011	United States
61	Joe Cinque's Consolation	Helen Garner	2004	Australia
62	The Covenant of Water	Abraham Verghese	2023	Ethiopia/United States
63	We Need to Talk About Kevin	Lionel Shriver	2003	United States
64	Bel Canto	Ann Patchett	2001	United States
65	Question 7	Richard Flanagan	2023	Australia
66	The Tattooist of Auschwitz	Heather Morris	2018	New Zealand
67	Circe	Madeline Miller	2018	United States
68	Educated	Tara Westover	2018	United States
69	The Midnight Library	Matt Haig	2020	United Kingdom
70	Station Eleven	Emily St. John Mandel	2014	Canada
71	The Bee Sting	Paul Murray	2023	Ireland
72	The Guernsey Literary and Potato Peel Pie Society	Mary Ann Shaffer and Annie Barrows	2008	United States
73	The Happiest Man on Earth	Eddie Jaku	2020	Germany/Australia
74	The Overstory	Richard Powers	2018	United States
75	The Happiest Refugee	Anh Do	2010	Australia
76	Where is the Green Sheep?	Mem Fox and Judy Horacek	2004	Australia
77	Life After Life	Kate Atkinson	2013	United Kingdom
78	The Women	Kristin Hannah	2024	United States
79	Brooklyn	Colm Tóibín	2009	Ireland
80	A Short History of Nearly Everything	Bill Bryson	2003	United Kingdom/United States
81	Too Much Lip	Melissa Lucashenko	2018	Australia
82	Carpentaria	Alexis Wright	2006	Australia
83	The Lost Flowers of Alice Hart	Holly Ringland	2018	Australia
84	Stone Yard Devotional	Charlotte Wood	2024	Australia
85	Chai Time at Cinnamon Gardens	Shankari Chandran	2022	Australia
86	Cloud Atlas	David Mitchell	2004	United Kingdom
87	Fourth Wing	Rebecca Yarros	2023	United States
88	This House of Grief	Helen Garner	2014	Australia
89	People of the Book	Geraldine Brooks	2008	Australia/United States
90	This Is Going to Hurt	Adam Kay	2017	United Kingdom
91	The Bookbinder of Jericho	Pip Williams	2023	Australia
92	Gone Girl	Gillian Flynn	2012	United States
93	Project Hail Mary	Andy Weir	2021	United States
94	Lincoln in the Bardo	George Saunders	2017	United States
95	Piranesi	Susanna Clarke	2020	United Kingdom
96	Tom Lake	Ann Patchett	2023	United States
97	True History of the Kelly Gang	Peter Carey	2000	Australia
98	The Heart's Invisible Furies	John Boyne	2017	Ireland
99	Middlesex	Jeffrey Eugenides	2002	United States
100	Big Little Lies	Liane Moriarty	2014	Australia

== Statistics ==
=== Authors with multiple entries ===
#	Artist	Tracks
3	Geraldine Brooks	15, 46, 89
3	Anna Funder	17, 30, 43
2	Trent Dalton	1, 29
2	Pip Williams	7, 91
2	Richard Flanagan	13, 65
2	Khaled Hosseini	22, 49
2	Craig Silvey	24, 25
2	Tim Winton	38, 40
2	Madeline Miller	60, 67
2	Helen Garner	61, 88
2	Ann Patchett	64, 96

=== Countries represented ===
Country	#
United States	38
Australia	36
United Kingdom	18
Ireland	6
Afghanistan	2
Canada	2
Sweden	2
Ethiopia	1
Germany	1
Israel	1
Italy	1
Japan	1
New Zealand	1
South Korea	1
Zimbabwe	1

== Reception ==
Writing for The Conversation, Melanie Saward found the list lacked diversity.
