= Eric Lambert (author) =

Australian author and communist (1918–1966)

Eric Frank Lambert (19 January 1918 – 16 April 1966) was an Australian author and a sometime member of the Communist Party of Australia.

== Early life ==
Born in London in 1918, Eric Lambert emigrated to Australia at the age of 2 with his parents – they settled in Manly, Sydney. He left school at the age of 17 and worked in a garage having been denied the grammar school and university education he hankered after. In 1940 he enlisted in the Australian Imperial Force. He saw action in the Middle East with the 2/2nd Machine Gun Battalion (January 1941 – October 1942) and the 2/15th Battalion (to January 1943). From August 1943 he was in Papua New Guinea with the 2/15th, returning home in March 1944. While in Singapore (September – October 1945) assisting the repatriation of prisoners of war from Changi, he was promoted to Sergeant. He was discharged in Melbourne on 7 December 1945. Determined to work for the cause of peace, soon meeting and joining forces with Frank Hardy, who was at a similar stage with his first novel, Power without Glory. Hardy persuaded him to join the Communist Party.

== Writing career ==
He started writing on a Commonwealth Literary Fund grant and self-published his first novel The Twenty Thousand Thieves which was later taken up by Frederick Muller Ltd. London, in 1952. It was based on his memories of WWII and despite getting caught up in the Cold War politics of the time, it sold three-quarters of a million copies.

== Realist Writers ==
With Frank Hardy and Stephen Murray-Smith, Lambert co-founded the Melbourne Realist Writers Association and collaborated with its members to edit and produce its journal, the Realist Writer. In the mid-1950s, he was a co-founder of the journal Overland. In 1955 he attended the World Assembly for Peace in Helsinki and afterwards stayed on in London. Hearing of disturbing events in Hungary, he crossed the border without a visa during the 1956 uprising and was horrified by the aggression of the Soviets against the young people who were demonstrating for independence and peace. Back in London, he attempted to get his reports published in the Communist Party press, but to no avail and left the Party embittered with communism. Instead, he wrote about events in Hungary for The Daily Telegraph, much to the chagrin of his former communist colleagues.

== Later life ==
He had continued writing throughout his time in Europe, and apart from drawing further on his war experience he also dealt with the Eureka Stockade, in The Five Bright Stars (1954) and Ned Kelly in Kelly (1964). He remarried in March 1963 to Phyllis Hogarth. Lambert formerly adopted Hogarth's daughter and Phyllis gave birth to their own daughter, Francesca, in early 1964. He was devoted to them and although he had recurrent ill-health, depression and alcohol abuse, being a father provided him with much happiness. Sadly, he later died of acute hypertensive heart failure (due to alcoholism) in April 1966 in Little Maplestead, Essex.

== Bibliography ==
=== Extant articles ===
– some of the ones written whilst a member of the Realist Writers group, Melbourne Branch

- ([1947]1953) 'Guns', Jindyworobak Anthology, Melbourne : Jindyworobak.
- (1950) 'Dinner at Moussa's’, Meanjin, Winter 1950:93–97.
- (1951) 'Wings of the morning', Meanjin, Summer 1951:325-30.
- (1951) 'The book', Meat Industry Journal, Mar–Apr 1951:6.
- (1951) 'Owners', Maritime Worker, May 1951:2.
- (1952) 'Why we need this book society', Meanjin, v 11, n 1, 1952:293–4.
- (1952) 'You write because you live', Realist Writer, Sept–Oct 1952:7–8,16.
- (1952) 'The craft of writing', Realist Writer, Nov–Dec 1952:8–11.
- (1954) 'My old Australian mate', Tribune, 7.4.54:7.

=== Novels ===
- (1951) The Twenty Thousand Thieves, Melbourne : Newmont. (self-published but later taken up by Frederick Muller Ltd. London; now in its 11th print with Penguin, Australia)
- (1954) The Veterans, London : Shakespeare Head.
- (1955) The Five Bright Stars, Sydney : Australasian Book Society.
- ([1956]1963) Watermen, London : Brown, Watson Ltd.
- (1958) The Dark Backward, London : Frederick Muller Ltd.
- (1959) Glory Thrown In, London : Frederick Muller Ltd.
- (1960) The Rehabilitated Man, London : Frederick Muller Ltd.
- (1962) Ballarat, London : Frederick Muller Ltd.
- (1963) Dolphin, London : Frederick Muller ltd.
- (1963) The Drip Dry Man, London : Frederick Muller Ltd.
- (1963) Diggers Die Hard, London : Fleetway Colourbacks.
- (1964–1966) Kelly, London : Corgi Books.
- (1964–1965) A Short Walk to the Stars, London : Corgi Books.
- (1965) The Tender Conspiracy, London : Frederick Muller Ltd.
- (1965) MacDougal's Farm, London : Frederick Muller Ltd.
- (1965–1968) The Long White Night, London : Corgi Books.
- (1967) Hiroshima Reef, London : Frederick Muller Ltd.
- (1967) Mad With Much Heart, London : Frederick Muller Ltd.

=== Works published under known pseudonyms ===
- Lambert, Eric as Frank Brennan (1960a) Oscar Wilde, London : Landsborough Publications, Four Square Books.
- Lambert, Eric as Frank Brennan (1960b) Sink the Bismarck, London : Landsborough Publications, Four Square Books.
- Lambert, Eric as Frank Brennan (1961) North to Alaska, London : Landsborough Publications, Four Square Books.

== Biography ==
Title: Desolate market : a biography of Eric Lambert Author: Zoe O'Leary Publication Details: Sydney : Edwards & Shaw, 1974. Language: English Identifier: ISBN 085551003X
