= Rachel Bin Salleh =

Indigenous Australian publisher

Rachel Bin Salleh OAM
- Born: Kimberley region of Western Australia
- Citizenship: Australia
- Occupations: Aboriginal Australian publisher, author and editor.
- Awards: 2020, inaugural Literary Lions Medal by Writing WA
- Honours: Pixie O’Harris

Rachel Bin Salleh is an Aboriginal Australian publisher, author and editor, descended from the Nimanburu and Yawuru peoples of the Kimberley region of Western Australia. She is best known for her long-standing role at Magabala Books, an Indigenous publishing house, where she has focused on supporting and promoting First Nations authors and illustrators.

== Early life and background ==
Bin Salleh is from Broome, Western Australia, also known as Rubibi by the Yawuru people, and has spoken about the influence of culture, country and language in her life and work. She was brought up in a culturally diverse family, with a Catholic mother who migrated from Derry, Northern Ireland and an Aboriginal-Malaysian father who grew up on Yawuru land.

== Career ==
Bin Salleh joined Magabala Books in the early 2000s and worked in various roles, eventually becoming Publisher. Under her leadership, Magabala has published numerous award-winning works by Aboriginal and Torres Strait Islander writers and illustrators, spanning children's books, poetry, memoir, history and fiction.

She is an active advocate for Indigenous storytelling, and mentors emerging First Nations authors, writers and illustrators in the Australian literary sector.

In 2018, Bin Salleh published her debut picture book, Alfred’s War, illustrated by Samantha Fry. The book tells the story of an Aboriginal soldier who served in World War I who returned home to a country that did not recognise his service. It was shortlisted for several awards and received praised for its storytelling and historical insight.

In July 2025 Bin Salleh was appointed to the Writing Australia Council, under Creative Australia (the Australian government's arts funding and advisory body).

=== Recognition ===
In 2019 Bin Salleh received Publisher of the Month from Australian Book Review.

In 2020, she was awarded the inaugural Literary Lions Medal by Writing WA, recognising her leadership and contribution to Western Australian writing and publishing. Also that year, under her direction as Publisher, Magabala Books won the ABIA Small Publisher of the Year at the Australian Book Industry Awards (ABIA).

Bin Salleh was a finalist for Australian of the Year in 2021 (WA Australian of the Year – Arts & Culture).

In 2025 Bin Salleh was awarded the Pixie O’Harris Award from the Australian Book Industry Awards (ABIA), which recognises exceptional commitment to children's literature in Australia.

Bin Salleh received an Order of Australia in 2025 for her services to literature.

== Published works ==
- Alfred’s War (2018) picture book, Magabala Books, illustrated by Samantha Fry (now Samantha Campbell)
- The Malay Methuselah (2021) short story, appears in: Australian Short Stories, September no. 67 2021
