= Nine Parts of Desire =

1994 book by Geraldine Brooks

- First edition
- Author: Geraldine Brooks
- Publisher: Doubleday
- Publication date: 1994

Nine Parts of Desire: The Hidden World of Islamic Women (1994) is a non-fiction book by Australian journalist Geraldine Brooks, based on her experiences among Muslim women of the Middle East. It was an international bestseller, translated into 17 languages.

The book deals with cultural and religious practices, describes positive as well as negative experiences, and in parts is critical of cultural practices related to the oppression of women.

Brooks stated that she, as stated by Canadian Woman Studies, "wrote the book for those people who like her, before she visited Islamic countries, would look at a woman in a chador and burst into outrage or piety. She then sets out to show that neither is an appropriate attitude." Ms. wrote that Brooks "applauds the everyday rebellions of Muslim women" and that she is "[s]imultaneously challenging both Western myths and trendy notions of "cultural relativity"". In the book, Brooks asks whether it is possible to create an Islamic feminism.

The name comes from the saying by Ali: "God created sexual desire in 10 parts; then he gave nine parts to women and one to men." William B. Quandt of Foreign Affairs wrote that in the view of Islamists, "Given women's incredible sexuality, restrictions are needed to preserve the welfare and stability of society."

Martha Shelley of On the Issues wrote that compared to Women & Gender in Islam by Leila Ahmed and Price of Honor by Jan Goodwin, the book has less "historical depth".

== Background ==
Brooks worked for the Cairo bureau of The Wall Street Journal. Her assistant was named Sahar, and she worked as Brooks's translator. Sahar had been educated in the West, was young, and had a secular mindset. Brooks was inspired to make the book when Sahar began wearing an Islamic veil, and began espousing religious ideologies. The woman also declined the opportunity to attend Harvard University. Brooks wanted to understand why Sahar adopted a lifestyle that could be perceived as sexist against women. Brooks had taken a six-year residence and traveled to Egypt, Eritrea, the Arab states of the Persian Gulf, Iran, Israel, Jordan, and Saudi Arabia.

== Contents ==
The book includes chapters on Muhammad's practices with his wives and which compare and contrast the ideal in the Quran to the practiced reality. The Human Rights Quarterly wrote that "Brooks demonstrates that repressive policies toward women often are not based on accurate interpretations of religious texts." Brooks argued that because women in Islam gained the right to divorce and get inheritance, they had actually obtained rights in early Islam.

People chronicled in the book include women working for Hezbollah, a Saudi businesswoman, the United Arab Emirates's first female soldier, and a female American expatriate married to an Iranian man living in Iran. Faezeh Hashemi's efforts to restore female athletics in Iran are noted. Brooks also described the voting patterns of a female member of parliament in Iran. Brooks described two arranged marriages, one being a Kuwaiti couple who is happy, and the other being a Jordanian couple with a wife who is unhappy. She describes an honor killing of a Sudanese woman resident in the United Kingdom. At the end of the book she recalls seeing Indonesian Australian women wearing hijabs.

In the book, Brooks makes it clear that the status of women may differ significantly between different countries. Brooks herself stated that "the brightest hope for positive change might be found camouflaged among the black chadors of devout Iranian women". Iranian women as of 1994 had more rights compared to women from other Middle Eastern countries. Brooks wrote that "unquestioning adherence to religious rules gives them high ground from which to present their case for women's rights" but that "they have used that position sparingly." Quandt wrote that the idea that the religious following gives them the authority is "a variation on the only-Nixon-could-go-to-China theme." Shelley argued that Brooks's "somewhat rosy view" of Iranian women's lives is flawed because "the average Iranian girl will become neither an athlete nor a camerawoman covering the all-female Islamic games. Her life is much more likely to be circumscribed simply by the ideas and expectations of the man she marries."

Brooks argues that Islam's judgment should be "for the kind of life it offers the people in the lands where it predominates". Brooks advocates against female genital mutilation and honor killings, and Shelley stated that during this activism the author is "most effective".

Patricia Lee Dorff of Foreign Affairs stated that based on the book, "liberal women are an endangered species". Canadian Woman Studies wrote that "the author provides a good account of the rise of fundamentalism in the Muslim world and how even western-educated women are willingly accepting and follow fundamentalist interpretations and practices of Islam." The journal added that, according to the book, "women in Islamic countries are not just the passive recipients of government's ideologies, but much to the contrary are active agents in the processes of resisting, organizing, and fighting for social changes that positively improve women's status and situation." Laura Shapiro of Newsweek stated "Brooks emphasizes that there is plenty in Islamic history to justify more independent roles for women. But with fundamentalism on the rise, progressive interpretations of scripture are dangerous to advocate."

== Reception ==
The author of the Canadian Woman Studies stated that the work is "very helpful for a Western audience" and that it "does not only give a more realistic picture of Middle Eastern women but it also shows the directions in which future studies should go" despite the criticisms the CWS author has. The CWS article argued that there is a lack of "a clearly identifiable theoretical approach" in Brooks's journalism and a "lack of an adequate historical analysis of Muslim societies". The publication also argues that "Brooks has difficulty in accepting the lack of interest in feminist issues showed by some of her acquaintances." In regards to Brooks's argument that the Western powers are not showing action because the issue has to do with feminism even though the Western powers take action regarding race, the CWS article stated that Western countries have issues with both sexism and racism and that "to play off gender and race issues against one another is not only unhelpful but definitely harmful to the democratic and egalitarian struggle."

The publication Resources for Feminist Research is critical of the book. The publication argued that the work has "presuppositions, stereotypes, distortions and disingenuous paradoxes" because she presents the women in her book "as the wisdom of 'Muslim' authorities" and does so "without qualification". It argues that the work exhibits a "sense of superiority and the appearance of Western Self in opposition to the Other" and a double standard where the author excuses an increase of Islamic fundamentalism in Muslim countries but shows a negative reaction when seeing the hijab worn by Indonesian Australian women in her home country.

Geoff Lumetta of the Washington Report on Middle East Affairs argued that the book should make comparisons between the situation of women in the West and those in Islamic countries in order to gain a "universal perspective". Citing women chronicled in the book who have a positive attitude to being Muslim, Lumetta added "However, readers already inundated with negative portrayals of Islam shouldn't shy away from this book, which is much more than a rebuke of the religion."

Ms. wrote that "Brooks's exploration of the precarious status of women in the wake of Islamic fundamentalism is riveting."

Bronwyn Drainie of The Globe and Mail argued that women "have access to and empathy with the half of the world's population whose lives are so often ignored by the Western press and media" so therefore Nine Parts of Desire "demonstrates the best possible reason for employing women as foreign correspondents."

Victor T. Le Vine of the St. Louis Post - Dispatch wrote that "The book contains enough minor errors of interpretation and analysis to irritate some specialists on the subject, but it is not a work of scholarship, and as perceptive, intelligent and sympathetic reportage it is more than worth the price of admission."

The Human Rights Quarterly wrote that Brooks "has written a fascinating account that captures both the complexity and the variety of practices among Muslim women in different countries, while also puncturing a number of western stereotypes."

The New Yorker stated: "The author's revelations about these women's lives behind the veil are frank, enraging, and captivating."
