= Bible fiction =

Works drawing on Biblical characters and settings

The term Bible fiction refers to works of fiction that use characters, settings and events taken from the Bible. The degree of fiction in these works varies and, although they are often written by Christians or Jews, this is not always the case.

The early such novels were consistent with belief in the historicity of the Bible's narrative, replete with miracles, and God's explicit presence. Some of these works have been important and influential. In more recent times, writers have published heterodox Bible novels that reflect modern, postmodern or realist influences and themes.

An early Bible novel that may still be the most influential is Ben-Hur: A Tale of the Christ (1880) by Lew Wallace, published by Harper & Brothers. It was one of the best-selling American novels of the nineteenth century, remaining at the top of the US all-time bestseller list until the publication of Margaret Mitchell's Gone with the Wind (1936). Ben-Hur is a bildungsroman and adventure novel that follows the tumultuous life of its fictional protagonist, Judah Ben-Hur. He is born a Jewish noble from Jerusalem who suffers betrayal (by a boyhood friend). He suffers subsequent enslavement and imprisonment of his family by the Romans. Concurrent with Judah's narrative is the developing Christian story, as Jesus and Judah are natives of the same region and are about the same age.

Judah survives his ordeal and becomes a famous soldier and charioteer, enabling him to avenge his misfortune. Judah's encounters with Jesus, first during Judah's and then during Jesus' suffering, lead to the Messiah's curing Judah's sister and mother of leprosy and Judah's converting to a follower of Christ. Among the numerous film adaptations of the book is the 1959 epic version of the same title, starring Charlton Heston, and winning ten Academy Awards.

The Robe (1942) by Lloyd C. Douglas, a bestselling novel of that decade, explores the crucifixion of Jesus from the fictional point of view of Marcellus Gallio, the Roman tribune who commands the garrison that carries out the punishment. Marcellus gains custody of Jesus' robe; he converts to Christianity because of his experiences interacting with the robe's magical powers. The Robe adapted as a 1953 film that won an Academy Award.

From the mid-twentieth century, authors began to publish heterodox Bible fiction. The Last Temptation of Christ (1960), by Nikos Kazantzakis, was controversial and banned by certain groups and outlets for its fictional presentation of Jesus as wracked by temptations: beset by fear, doubts, depression, reluctance and lust. Jesus is still portrayed as a miracle-worker and the son of God, who is resurrected following the crucifixion.

Norman Mailer's The Gospel According to the Son (1997) is his fictional account of the Gospel narrative, which includes biblical miracles and the resurrection. This was considered notable in part because Mailer was Jewish, not Christian.

Philip Pullman's The Good Man Jesus and the Scoundrel Christ (2010) is a deeply allegorical retelling of the Christian story that uses postmodern techniques to present a polemic against Christianity. It retells the story of Jesus as if he were two brothers, "Jesus" and "Christ", with contrasting personalities. Jesus is a moral and spiritual man, and his brother Christ is an ambitious character who wishes to hijack Jesus's biography and legacy to develop a myth that will be the foundation for a powerful and worldly Church.

Other works are regarded as heterodox simply because they explore the Bible stories realistically, shorn of mythical, miraculous or magical elements. They may even include the process of development of mythology from historic events as part of the narrative. Realist Bible novels are typically semi-historical, set in Israel, Egypt or Rome, for instance, and including contemporary ideas about the political, class and racial conflicts; as well as accurate descriptions of urban and rural landscapes, with fidelity to known historical facts.

As Robert Graves said of his novel King Jesus (1946), "I undertake to my readers that every important element in my story is based on some tradition, however tenuous, and that I have taken more than ordinary pains to verify my historical background."

Realist Bible novels employ in some way the narratives that comprise the canonical Biblical narrative, but shorn of miracles, or God's explicit presence. With respect to Jesus' biography, Jesus is portrayed as a man, usually a rebel against the wealthy classes (sometimes he is born into a privileged background and rebels against his own class), and the ruling Romans and their local client autocrats. Sometimes Jesus's biography is enhanced by sources external to the canonical gospels such as Josephus' chronicles, the Talmud, or non-canonical gospels, and the author's imagination.

Graves' King Jesus develops the protagonist as a philosopher with a legitimate claim to be the earthly king of the Jews, since he is a descendant of Herod the Great, and the Old Testament's David. The novel also has heterodox retellings of Biblical stories.

Joseph and His Brothers (1943) is a novel by Thomas Mann that retells the familiar stories of Genesis, from Jacob to Joseph, setting it in the historical context of the Amarna Period. Mann considered it his greatest work.

The Red Tent (1997) a novel by Anita Diamant, is a first-person narrative that tells the story of Dinah, daughter of Jacob and sister of Joseph. Diamont has enlarged her character from her minor and brief role in the Bible. The book's title refers to the tent in which women of Jacob's tribe must, as dictated by ancient law, be quarantined while menstruating or giving birth. There the women find mutual support and encouragement from their mothers, sisters and aunts.

Lamb: The Gospel According to Biff, Christ's Childhood Pal by Christopher Moore is an absurdist comic fantasy that depicts the "lost" years of Jesus through the eyes of Jesus's childhood pal, "Levi bar Alphaeus who is called Biff".

Pulitzer Prize winner Geraldine Brooks' The Secret Chord (2015) is narrated by Natan, the prophet who communicates God's directives to David. The scriptures are her primary sources for the plot, which includes all the well-known key events: Goliath, David's facility with the harp, kingdom building, Bathsheba, and so on. There are other characters fully developed from Brooks' imagination and portrayed through Natan's point of view.

The Testament of Mary (2012) a novella by Colm Toibin, is a retelling of the Christian story from the point of view of Mary, the mother of Jesus. However, she does not believe Jesus is the Son of God – she knows he is a man – and she is contemptuous of the Gospel writers who visit her to solicit her cooperation and give her food and shelter. The themes or questions that the novel explores are narrative truth and fiction, feminism, loss, identity and corruption thereof, invasion of privacy, and worldly ambition. The Testament of Mary was adapted into a Broadway play.

The Liars' Gospel (2012), by Jewish author Naomi Alderman, retells the Christ story from a Jewish perspective. Four witnesses to the key events – Mary, Judas, Caiaphas and Barabbas – are the narrators in four sections of the novel, and the story spans the period from Pompey's siege of Jerusalem in 63 BC through to Titus's siege in 70 AD.

John the Baptizer (2009), by Brooks Hansen and published by W. W. Norton & Company, is a novelized life of John the Baptist that dramatizes the man beneath the hagiography. According to Christian theology, John was merely a forerunner to Christ, but Hansen's portrait is strongly influenced by the Gnostic teachings that reveal John as a messianic figure at the center of an ethnoreligious group called the Mandaeans, and more mature, rigorous and restrained than his younger and charismatic protégé Jesus.

Logos (2015), a novel by John Neeleman and published by Homebound Publications, a small press, and winner of an Independent Publisher Book Awards gold medal for religious fiction and the Utah Book Award for fiction, is a bildungsroman that follows the life and development of the anonymous author of the original gospel. Jacob, a former temple priest in Jerusalem who has been rendered bereft by the Jewish wars and consequent destruction of his family and culture, is inspired by his own autobiography and Paul's mythmaking to create the canonical gospels' original narrative.

The Gospel According to Lazarus (2019), a novel by Richard Zimler, expands upon the story of Lazarus of Bethany, who was raised from the dead in the Gospel of John. According to Zimler, one of the objectives of his novel was to return to the New Testament figures their Judaism, so in his narrative, Jesus is called Yeshua ben Yosef and Lazarus is called Eliezer ben Natan. Yeshua and Eliezer have been best friends from childhood, and Yeshua is characterized as a Merkabah mystic. The themes of the book include how we cope with a loss of faith, the terrible sacrifices we make for those we love, the transcendent meaning of Yeshua's mission, and how we go on after suffering a shattering trauma. Reviewing the novel for The Guardian, novelist Peter Stanford called it "a brave and engaging novel... a page-turner. I simply had to keep going to the very end in order to know on earth what would happen."

== See also ==
- Biblical speculative fiction
- Theological fiction
