= The Secret Chord =

2015 novel by Geraldine Brooks

- Author: Geraldine Brooks
- Language: English
- Genre: Literary fiction, historical fiction, biblical fiction
- Publisher: Viking Penguin
- Publication date: October 6, 2015
- Publication place: United States
- Media type: Print (hardcover)
- Pages: 320 pp.
- ISBN: 9780670025770 (hardcover 1st ed.)
- OCLC: 914163566
- Dewey Decimal: 823/.914
- LC Class: PR9619.3.B7153 S43 2015
- Preceded by: Caleb's Crossing

The Secret Chord is a 2015 novel about King David by Australian American author Geraldine Brooks.

== Plot summary ==
Told from the point of view of the prophet Nathan, this book follows the life of biblical King David.

== Factual background ==
The title is taken from the Leonard Cohen song "Hallelujah".

== Critical reception ==
A reviewer in The Harvard Crimson described Brooks's use of historical material as "spectacularly accessible."

== Awards ==
Year	Award	Category	Result	Ref.
2016	Australian Book Industry Awards	Literary Fiction	Shortlisted	
2016	Indie Book Awards (AUS)	Fiction	Shortlisted	
2016	Massachusetts Book Award	Fiction	Longlisted	
2016	Women's Prize for Fiction	—	Longlisted	
2017	International Dublin Literary Award	—	Longlisted	

== External ==
- Official website
- The Secret Chord
- The Secret Chord at LibraryThing
