= Nagi Maehashi =

Australian author

- Born: 1979 (age 46–47); Japan
- Citizenship: Australian
- Education: North Sydney Girls High School; University of Technology Sydney
- Occupations: Writer, businesswoman

Nagi Maehashi (前橋渚, Maehashi Nagi; born 1977 or 1978) is a Japanese-Australian author, cook and business owner. She created the website RecipeTin Eats and the not-for-profit organisation RecipeTin Meals, and is the author of the bestselling cookbooks RecipeTin Eats Dinner and Tonight.

== Biography ==
Maehashi was born in Japan and grew up in Sydney, Australia. She moved to Australia with her family in 1981, when she was three years old, and grew up in the northern Sydney suburb of Asquith. She has a younger brother, Goh, and a younger sister, Tamaki. Her mother, Yumiko, worked in IT, and in later life was persuaded by Nagi to start the food blog RecipeTin Japan, which focuses on Japanese recipes she has liked as well as those requested by her children.

She attended North Sydney Girls High School and completed a Bachelor of Commerce at the University of Technology Sydney. She worked in corporate finance, including in roles at PwC and Brookfield Multiplex, before launching her cooking blog in May 2014.

Maehashi's first book, RecipeTin Eats Dinner, was published in 2022 by Pan Macmillan Australia. As of January 2024 it had sold over 250,000 copies in Australia. It was the bestselling book in Australia in 2023 and was the highest-selling title by a debut Australian author in its first week of release. It won the Australian Book Industry's Book of the Year Award in 2023. As of 2023, the RecipeTin Eats website was receiving over 14 million visitors per week.

Maehashi's second book, Tonight, was published by Pan Macmillan Australia in October 2024. In its first week of release, it broke the Australian record for the highest first-week sales of a nonfiction book since BookScan records began in 2002.

Maehashi is also a frequent contributor to Good Food, the food blog of The Sydney Morning Herald and The Age.

Maehashi's Golden Retriever, Dozer, featured at the end of each RecipeTin Eats recipe and built his own online following. Dozer died on 5 February 2026, at the age of 13.

In April 2025, Maehashi accused Brooke Bellamy of plagiarising recipes in her book Bake with Brooki.

Maehashi won Illustrated Book of the Year at the 2025 Australian Book Industry Awards, for her book Tonight.

== Philanthropic work ==
During Australia’s COVID-19 lockdowns, Maehashi created and contributed to a GoFundMe page to fund meals for healthcare workers. In 2021 she created RecipeTin Meals, providing meals to people in need. As of 2023, RecipeTin Meals was distributing up to 500 meals per day.

== In popular culture ==
Reflecting the popularity of RecipeTin Eats, in 2024 the Australian satirical website The Betoota Advocate published a mock news story with the headline "Entire Nation Seemingly Unable to Cook Without Consulting RecipeTin Eats".
