= Corey Tutt =

Indigenous Australian mentor and STEM champion

Corey Tutt OAM
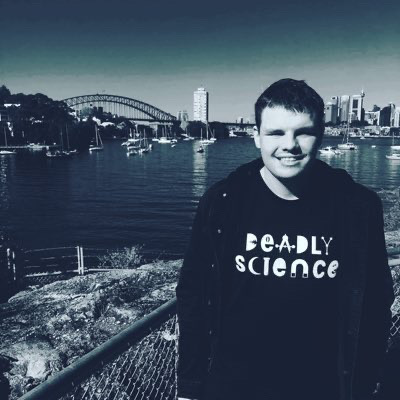
- Tutt in 2019
- Born: New South Wales, Australia
- Occupations: Research assistant; Director & CEO, DeadlyScience
- Known for: DeadlyScience founder 2020 NSW Young Australian of the Year
- Website: deadlyscience.org.au

Corey Aden Tutt is an Aboriginal Australian STEM professional, author, social entrepreneur and the founder of DeadlyScience, an initiative that provides STEM resources to remote schools throughout Australia. In 2020 he was named the NSW Young Australian of the Year.

== Early life ==
Tutt grew up in the Illawarra, New South Wales, and is of Kamilaroi heritage. He attended Dapto High School, where his favourite subjects were science, agriculture, and history.

In 2011, after a close friend committed suicide, Tutt became a travelling alpaca shearer throughout Australia and New Zealand, before eventually rediscovering his love for science.

== Career ==
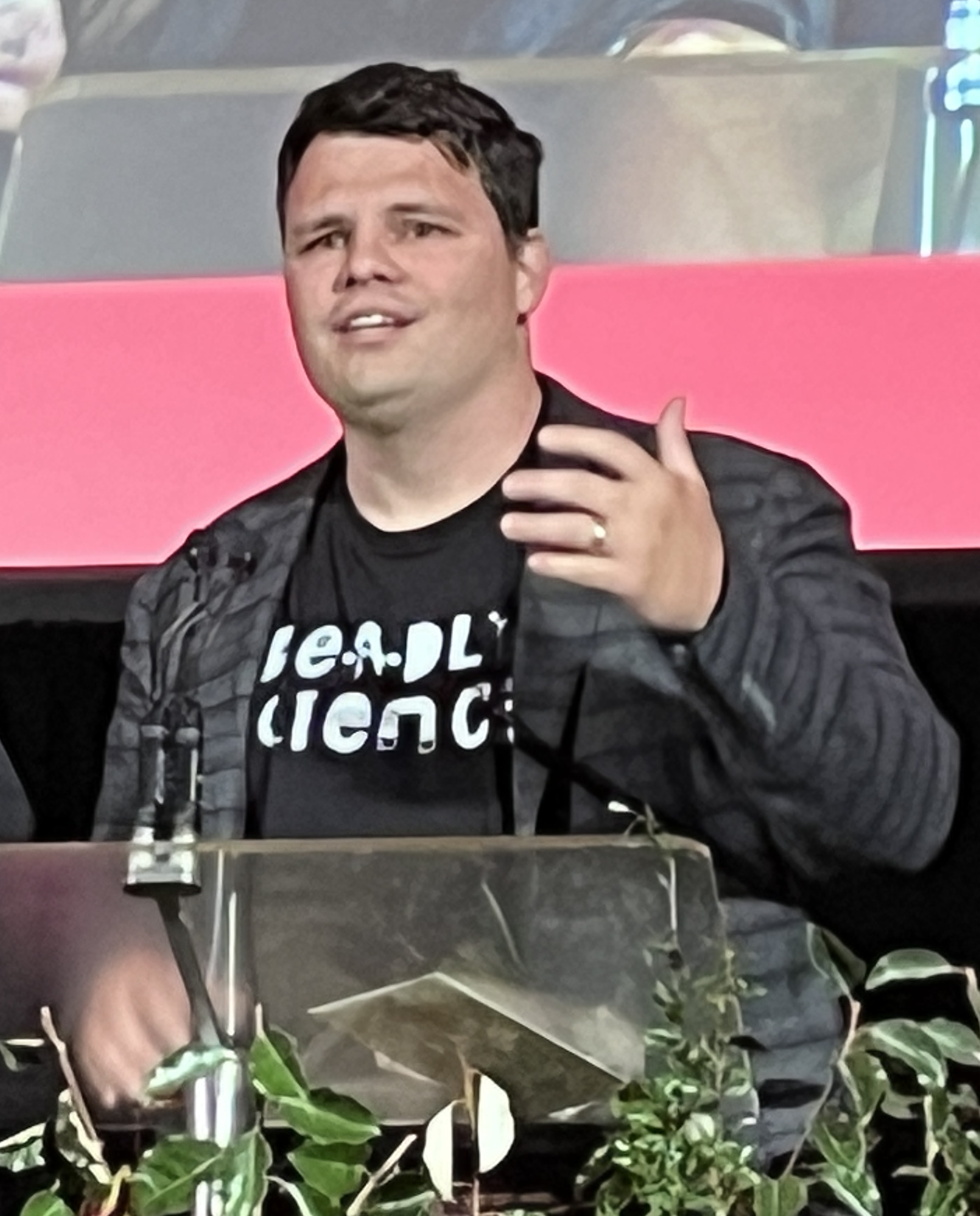
Tutt at the 2023 NSW Premier's Literary Awards

Tutt began his career as a zookeeper on the NSW South Coast, then spent time as an alpaca shearer travelling throughout Australia and New Zealand.

In 2018, Tutt founded DeadlyScience to "provide science books and early reading material to remote schools in Australia".

In 2019, he started working as a research assistant at the University of Sydney's Matilda Centre for Research in Mental Health and Substance Use.

In 2022, Tutt authored the award-winning best seller, The First Scientists: Deadly Inventions and Innovations from Australia's First Peoples, illustrated by Archibald Prize-winning artist Blak Douglas.

In 2023 Tutt arranged for seven Yorta Yorta students from Shepparton in Victoria to meet seven-time Formula One world champion Lewis Hamilton.

In June 2023, Tutt released This Book Thinks Ya Deadly, featuring the profiles of 80 Aboriginal Australians who are doing praiseworthy things across sport, art, activism and science, through to politics, education and literature. The book is illustrated by Molly Hunt.

Caution! This Book Contains Deadly Reptiles, illustrated by Ben Williams, was published in 2025.

== DeadlyScience ==
Tutt founded DeadlyScience while working at Sydney University. Originally working two jobs to fund DeadlyScience, he set up a gofundme page that attracted over A$240,000 in donations, after realising that there was a school in remote Australia who had only fifteen books in their library. Starting off by sending his own books and other resources, including telescopes to remote schools, Tutt started coordinating donated resources, including books from high-profile scientists such as Brian Cox and Karl Kruszelnicki. By 2020 he had delivered 7,000 books and 200 telescopes to over 100 schools and foundations. He wants to encourage Indigenous students in remote communities to pursue a career in STEM.

He particularly wants to ensure that every remote Australian school has resources that advance the premise that Aboriginals were Australia's first scientists, such as Bruce Pascoe's book, Dark Emu.

From 2019, Tutt founded a series of Deadly Junior Scientist Awards, aimed at inspiring Indigenous students to engage with STEM and to examine local wildlife and land in a scientific way.

In 2020, DeadlyScience began assisting with rebuilding schools affected by devastating bush fires which ravaged most of the South Coast of New South Wales. They did this by providing books and resources to schools that have been destroyed by fire. DeadlyScience also successfully raised A$7,000 for Broome Primary School in Western Australia that was burnt down by an arson attack. Tutt said on the ABC Nightlife program "Schools are the heartbeat of our community and for our community in Broome we stand with you during this dark time".

In 2020 he was awarded NSW Young Australian of the Year.

In 2021 Tutt led a project to provide food and educational supplies to Aboriginal families in NSW struggling with COVID-19. During the floods on the Mid-north coast of NSW in 2021, when Telegraph Point Public School was destroyed by flooding, Tutt donated books to replace the books lost by the school.

During the 2021 COVID-19 outbreak in NSW, Tutt led a social media campaign to support kids and families doing it tough in lockdown, and sent books to families.

Tutt appeared on Wil Anderson's podcast Wilosphy, in which he spoke about overcoming trauma as a child to create DeadlyScience.

By October 2021, DeadlyScience had distributed more than 25,000 books and other STEM resources to over 110 communities around the country.

In April 2022 Tutt worked with McLaren Formula One team and software company Smartsheet to feature the DeadlyScience logo on the side of both McLaren cars for the Grand Prix in Melbourne.

In 2022 DeadlyScience donated Lego to over 200 schools across Australia.

In November 2022 Tutt organised a bus for Cabbage Tree Island School after the devastating floods that destroyed their school. Tutt also gave every child, from three schools devastated by the floods, a brand new book so they would not lose their passions for STEM.

== Other roles and activities ==
Tutt is a member of the equity and diversity committee at Science & Technology Australia.

As of 2021, Tutt was playing rugby union for the Port Macquarie Pirates.

== Recognition and awards ==
- 2019: AMP Foundation Tomorrow Maker
- 2019: STEM Champion Award, in the 2019 Indigenous STEM Awards
- 2020: ABC Trailblazer Heywire
- 2020: Indigenous STEM Champion CSIRO
- 2020: NSW Young Australian of the Year
- 2020: One of ten Human Rights Heroes at the substitute Human Rights Awards
- 2021: The Australian Museum's Eureka Prize for STEM Inclusion, with Team DeadlyScience
- 2022: Finalist, NSW/ACT Indigenous Achievement Award
- 2022: Medal of the Order of Australia (OAM)
- 2022: The First Scientists: Deadly Inventions and Innovations from Australia's First Peoples, winner, Book of the Year for Younger Children at the Australian Book Industry Awards
- 2023: The First Scientists: Deadly Inventions and Innovations from Australia's First Peoples, winner, Children's Book of the Year and shortlisted for the Indigenous writers' prize, both at the NSW Premier's Literary Awards
- 2026: Shortlisted for the Victorian Premier's Prize for Children's Literature for Caution! This Book Contains Deadly Reptiles
- 2026: Shortlisted for the Children's Book of the Year Award: Edith Pownall Award for Caution! This Book Contains Deadly Reptiles
- 2026: Winner, Australian Book Industry Awards Book of the Year for Younger Children (ages 7–12) for Caution! This Book Contains Deadly Reptiles
