= March (novel) =

2005 novel by Geraldine Brooks

- First edition cover
- Author: Geraldine Brooks
- Language: English
- Genre: Historical novel
- Publisher: Viking Press
- Publication date: 2005
- Publication place: United States
- Media type: Print (Hardback and Paperback)
- Pages: 288 pp
- ISBN: 0-670-03335-9
- OCLC: 54974530
- Dewey Decimal: 823/.914 22
- LC Class: PR9619.3.B7153 M37 2005

March (2005) is a novel by Geraldine Brooks. It is a novel that retells Louisa May Alcott's novel Little Women from the point of view of Alcott's protagonists' absent father and explaining the events surrounding his absence during the American Civil War in 1862. The novel won the 2006 Pulitzer Prize for Fiction.

== Plot summary ==
In 1862, Mr. March, an abolitionist and chaplain in the Union Army, is driven by his conscience to leave his home and family in Concord, Massachusetts, to participate in the war. During this time, March writes letters to his family, but he withholds the true extent of the brutality and injustices he witnesses on and off the battlefields. He has a prolonged illness stemming from poor conditions on a cotton farm in Virginia. While in hospital, he has an unexpected meeting with Grace, an intelligent and literate black nurse whom he first met as a young woman staying in a large house where she was enslaved. The recovering March, despite his guilt and grief over his survival when others have perished, returns home to his wife and Little Women, but he has been scarred by the events he has gone through. The novel accurately reflects Bronson Alcott's principles, notably his belief that boys and girls of all races had a right to education and his wish to follow a vegetarian diet. It presents the young Mrs March as a fiery character with strong verbal and physical expressions of anger.

== Sources ==
The character of March is based in part on Alcott's father, Amos Bronson Alcott, who was a teacher and abolitionist. Brooks used as source materials Mr. Alcott's letters and journals, and the writings of Henry David Thoreau and Ralph Waldo Emerson, who were friends of the Alcott family. Thoreau and Emerson also appear in the novel as secondary characters and friends of the Marches.

== Commentary ==
Teresa Nielsen Hayden has compared the novel to fan fiction, saying that the only difference is that Brooks, Alcott, and publisher Viking Press are "dreadfully respectable." Nielsen Hayden believes that creating fan fiction is "a basic impulse."

In an NPR interview by Melissa Block, Brooks reveals that a more physical connection to the Civil War was her inspiration for the novel. "The author lives near the site of the battle where, on Oct. 21, 1861, on a steep bluff overlooking the Potomac River, Union forces were flanked and routed by Confederate troops. The discovery of a Union soldier's belt buckle in the Civil War-era courtyard of Brooks' home provided the germ of the novel."
