= Harvest (magazine) =

Australian literary magazine

- Categories: Literature, Culture
- Publisher: Col. Mustard Productions
- Founded: 2007
- First issue: June 2008
- Final issue: October 2011
- Country: Australia
- Based in: Melbourne
- Website: harvestmagazine.wordpress.com

harvest was an Australian literary magazine based in Melbourne. Founded in 2007, the first issue appeared in June 2008. It stopped accepting submissions and publishing on its website after October 2011.

== Content ==
harvest published:

- fiction
- memoir
- essays
- creative non-fiction
- poetry
- art

== Contributors ==
harvest published new Australian writers, including Jessica Au, Emily Bitto, Iain Britton, Simon Cox, Patrick Cullen, Nathan Curnow, Maxine Clarke, Anthony Lawrence, Joel Magarey, Meg Mundell, Ruby Murray, Ryan O'Neill, Nick Powell, Josephine Rowe, Michael Sala, Estelle Tang, Tara June Winch and Evie Wyld. Featured Australian artists included Michelle Macintosh, Allison Colpoys, Luci Everett, and the Greedy Hen team. Featured international artists included Martin O'Neill and Wallzo.

== Staff ==
- Founding Editors Davina Bell, Julia Carlomagno and Rachael Howlett
- Poetry Editor Josephine Rowe
- Art Director Imogen Stubbs
- Design Template Marc Martin

From 2007 until mid-2009, harvest's poetry editor was Geoff Lemon.

== Early Harvest ==
Before closing in 2011, harvest partnered with 100 Story Building to produce a literary magazine for children and young people: Early Harvest. Early Harvest supports primary school students to produce work to submit for publication, and a team of young editors to make as many editorial decisions as possible. The program produced an annual magazine until 2018, switching from 2019 to publishing stories in a paperback book format under individual titles (chosen by the editors). "Early Harvest" remains the name of the program.
