= Evelyn Araluen =

Australian Indigenous poet

- Writing career
- Notable works: Dropbear; The Rot
- Notable awards: Stella Prize; Victorian Prize for Literature

Evelyn Araluen is an Australian poet and literary editor. She won the 2022 Stella Prize for her first book, Dropbear. In 2026, she won the Victorian Prize for Literature for The Rot.

== Early life ==
Araluen is an Aboriginal Australian of the Bundjalung people, born on Dharug land.

== Career ==
Araluen's poetry has been published in The Best Australian Poems 2016, Overland, Cordite Poetry Review, and Southerly. She contributed the chapter, "Finding Ways Home" to Anita Heiss' Growing Up Aboriginal in Australia.

In 2019 she and Jonathan Dunk were appointed co-editors of the Australian literary journal Overland.

Her first book, Dropbear, was published by the University of Queensland Press in March 2021.

Her second book, The Rot, was published by the University of Queensland Press in November 2025.

== Recognition and awards ==
After being runner-up in the 2016 Nakata Brophy Prize for Young Indigenous Writers for her poem, "Learning Bundjalung on Tharawal", she won the following year for her short story, "Muyum: a transgression". In 2017 she also won first and third prizes in the Overland Judith Wright Poetry Prize for New and Emerging Poets for "Guarded by birds" and "Dropbear poetics".

In 2018 Araluen received one of the Wheeler Centre's inaugural Next Chapter grants, providing 12 months' mentoring by Tony Birch and a three-day writing retreat at Varuna, The Writers' House. In November of 2019 she and Jonathan Dunk were joint recipients of a Neilma Sidney Literary Travel Fund grant. Araluen also won the inaugural Professional Development Award of the 2021 Melbourne Prize.

Dropbear won the 2022 Stella Prize and was highly commended in the 2021 Anne Elder Award. It was shortlisted for the 2021 Judith Wright Calanthe Award, the 2022 Victorian Premier's Literary Award for Indigenous Writing, and the 2022 Kenneth Slessor Prize for Poetry.

Araluen's 2025 collection, The Rot, won the Victorian Premier's Literary Award for Indigenous Writing and the Victorian Prize for Literature in 2026. It also won the Australian Book Industry Awards Small Publishers' Adult Book of the Year and was shortlisted for the Victorian Premier's Prize for Poetry that year. The Rot was also shortlisted for the Poetry prize at the 2026 Prime Minister's Literary Awards.

== Publications ==
- Araluen, Evelyn (2021). Dropbear. St Lucia: University of Queensland Press. ISBN 978-0-7022-6318-7.
- Araluen, Evelyn (2025). The Rot. St Lucia: University of Queensland Press. ISBN 978-0-7022-6896-0.
