= People of the Book (novel) =

2008 historical novel by Geraldine Brooks

- First edition cover
- Author: Geraldine Brooks
- Language: English
- Genre: Historical fiction
- Publisher: Viking Penguin
- Publication date: January 1, 2008
- Publication place: United States
- Media type: Print (hardcover)
- Pages: 372 pages
- ISBN: 978-0-670-01821-5
- OCLC: 123912702

People of the Book is a 2008 historical novel by Geraldine Brooks. The story focuses on imagined events surrounding the protagonist and real historical past of the still-extant Sarajevo Haggadah, one of the oldest surviving Jewish illuminated texts.

== Plot summary ==
The novel tells the fictional story of Dr. Hanna Heath, an Australian book conservator who comes to Sarajevo to restore the Haggadah. Her work on the book leaves her with questions: why is the book illustrated, unlike other Haggadot? Why was the last restoration job, a hundred years earlier, done so poorly? What happened to the metal clasps that once held the parchment pages pressed together? How did the Haggadah come from fifteenth-century Spain to the Balkans? In the course of the restoration she takes microscopic samples: fragments of a butterfly's wing caught in the spine, a long white cat hair tangled in the binding, traces of salt crystals, a wine stain mixed with blood.

The story alternates between showing Hanna researching the Haggadah in the present, searching archives and taking her samples to forensic labs, and following the history of the Haggadah across five hundred years, in reverse chronological order, revealing the (fictional) explanations for all of Hanna's discoveries.

== Factual background ==
The book's Afterword briefly explains which parts of the novel are based on fact and which are imaginary. Geraldine Brooks wrote an article for The New Yorker that provides more details about the Sarajevo Haggadah and its real-life rescuers, especially Derviš Korkut, who hid it from the Nazis. It also explains that Lola, the young Jewish guerrilla fighter in the novel, is based on a real person named Mira Papo, who was sheltered by Derviš Korkut and his wife Servet.

== Critical reception ==
The novel has been compared with Dan Brown's The Da Vinci Code, with USA Today calling it an erudite version of Brown's work; other reviewers observed that it is slower paced, that there are no cliffhangers, and that readers "are never convinced ... by Hanna's contrived and clichéd personal story".

== Awards ==
In 2008, it won the Australian Book Industry Award (ABIA) Book of the Year and Literary Fiction Book of the Year.
