= Dropbear (book) =

2021 poetry collection by Evelyn Araluen

- Author: Evelyn Araluen
- Genre: Poetry
- Publisher: University of Queensland Press
- Publication date: 2/3/2021
- Publication place: Australia
- Pages: 112
- Awards: 2022 Stella Prize
- ISBN: 9780702263187

Dropbear is a 2021 collection of poetry and prose by Evelyn Araluen, an Aboriginal poet of the Bundjalung people. Dropbear was published by University of Queensland Press in 2021 and was the winner of the 2022 Stella Prize—it was the first book of poetry to do so. The book was also shortlisted for awards at the New South Wales Premier's Literary Awards, the Victorian Premier's Literary Awards and the Queensland Literary Awards. The collection has been described as part of the Indigenous "literary resistance", with Jeanine Leane writing in the Sydney Review of Books that the work "unsettles settler Australia consciousness with power and precision, leaving no colonial tropes or settler platitudes unchallenged or unscathed".

== Reception ==
The Stella Prize judges' report described Dropbear as "a breathtaking collection of poetry and short prose which arrests key icons of mainstream Australian culture and turns them inside out, with malice aforethought". The Victorian Premier's Literary Awards judges described the work as "a powerful act of sovereign resistance, breaking open the intersections of power, race and colonial fantasy". In a review for the Sydney Review of Books, Jeanine Leanne wrote that Dropbear "moves seamlessly between activism, literary criticism, remembrance deconstruction and confrontation". The collection also received positive reviews in the Sydney Morning Herald, Australian Book Review, The Guardian and Meanjin.

Reviewers praised Araluen's ability to subvert "colonial kitsch". Araluen critiques the aesthetics of the "pastoral" and the canonisation of Australian literary figures like Henry Lawson, Banjo Patterson and Les Murray. Araluen suggests that these literary traditions have been used to negate Indigenous sovereignty and to justify settler colonialism. John Kinsella wrote in a review for the Sydney Morning Herald that Araluen "plays back conventional devices and tropes, and undoes them so effectively that no colonial shibboleth is left unchallenged or undecoded".

== Awards ==
Awards for Dropbear
Year	Award	Result	Ref.
2021	Queensland Literary Award for Poetry	Shortlisted	
2021	Anne Elder Award	Highly commended	
2022	Stella Prize	Winner	
2022	Australian Book Industry Awards Adult Book of the Year	Winner	
2022	New South Wales Premier's Literary Award for Poetry	Shortlisted	
2022	Victorian Premier's Literary Award for Indigenous Writing	Shortlisted	
