= Australian Book Industry Awards =

Annual publishers' and literary awards held by the Australian Publishers Association

The Australian Book Industry Awards (ABIA) are publishers' and literary awards held by the Australian Publishers Association (APA) annually in Australia since 2001.

The awards celebrate "the achievements of authors and publishers in bringing Australian books to readers". Award recipients are first selected by an academy of more than 200 industry professionals, and then a shortlist and winners are chosen by judging panels.

In 2025, ABIA is presenting 14 book awards, eight business awards, and the Lloyd O’Neil and Pixie O’Harris awards.

== History ==
The Australian Book Publishers Association (ABPA) first presented the Lloyd O'Neil Award for "exceptional long service to the industry", at the annual awards night in 1992, in honour of publisher Lloyd O'Neil, after his death in February 1992. The first Pixie O'Harris Award was presented in 1994, in hour of book illustrator Pixie O'Harris, which recognises "publishers, editors, creators, booksellers, publicists and other industry representatives who have worked consistently in the field of children’s literature, demonstrated commitment beyond the call of duty, and who have developed a reputation for their contribution".

The ABPA was renamed to the Australian Publishers Association (APA) in 1996. In 1999 and 2000, the APA and Australian Booksellers Association (ABA) held a joint industry awards night at the ABA conference and APA trade fair in Sydney.

In 2001, the APA Book Industry Awards became known as the APA Australian Book Industry Awards (ABIA). In the following year, eight awards were presented at the awards night, which were Publisher of the Year Award, Booksellers Career Development Award, Good Reading Award, Publishing Project of the Year, Marketing Campaign of the Year, and Distributor of the Year, and the Lloyd O’Neil and Pixie O’Harris Award.

In 2006, the awards were rebranded with the ABIA acronym, the number of awards was increased to 18 and the operation of the awards was placed in the hands of an academy of publishers and booksellers called the Australian Book Industry Academy.

In 2025, book industry news outlet Books+Publishing took over production of ABIA from the APA under a licensing agreement.

== 2018 winners ==
The 2018 ABIA winners were announced on 3 May, with Jessica Townsend's Nevermoor receiving three awards:

- ABIA Book of the Year: Nevermoor, Jessica Townsend
- Biography of the Year Award: Working Class Man, Jimmy Barnes
- General Fiction Book of the Year: The Secrets She Keeps, Michael Robotham
- General Non-fiction Book of the Year: The Trauma Cleaner, Sarah Krasnostein
- Literary Fiction Book of the Year: See What I Have Done, Sarah Schmidt
- Illustrated Book of the Year: Maggie's Recipe for Life, Maggie Beer and Ralph Martins
- International Book of the Year: Good Night Stories for Rebel Girls, Elena Favilli and Francesca Cavallo
- Small Publisher adults Book of the Year: The Australian Bird Guide, Peter Menkhorst, Danny Rogers, Rohan Clarke et al
- Small Publisher children’s Book of the Year: It's OK to Feel the Way You Do, Josh Langley
- The Matt Richell Award for new writer of the Year: Nevermoor, Jessica Townsend
- Book of the Year for older children (ages 13+): Begin, End, Begin: A #LoveOzYA Anthology, edited by Danielle Binks
- Book of the Year for younger children (ages seven to 12): Nevermoor, Jessica Townsend
- Children's picture Book of the Year (ages up to six): No One Likes a Fart, Zoë Foster Blake
- Audiobook of the Year: The 91-Storey Treehouse, Andy Griffiths and Terry Denton, narrated by Stig Wemyss
- The Lloyd O'Neill hall of fame Award for services to the Australian book industry: Suzy Wilson
- The Pixie O'Harris Award for outstanding commitment to children's literature: Jane Covernton
- Publisher of the Year: HarperCollins
- Small Publisher of the Year: Thames & Hudson Australia
- National book retailer of the Year: Dymocks
- Independent book retailer of the Year: Readings
- Rising star Award: Shalini Kunahlan, marketing manager at Text Publishing

== 2019 winners ==
Trent Dalton's Boy Swallows Universe picked up four awards in the 2019 ABIA awards. Winners were:

- ABIA Book of the Year: Boy Swallows Universe, Trent Dalton
- Biography of the Year Award: Eggshell Skull, Bri Lee
- General Fiction Book of the Year: The Lost Flowers of Alice Hart, Holly Ringland
- General Non-fiction Book of the Year: No Friend But the Mountains: Writing from Manus Prison, Behrouz Boochani, Omid Tofighian (translator)
- Honourable mention for Non-fiction Book of the Year: Any Ordinary Day, Leigh Sales
- Literary Fiction Book of the Year: Boy Swallows Universe, Trent Dalton
- Illustrated Book of the Year: Family: New vegetable classics to comfort and nourish, Hetty McKinnon
- International Book of the Year: Less, Andrew Sean Greer
- Small Publisher adults Book of the Year: Growing Up Aboriginal in Australia, Dr Anita Heiss (ed.)
- Small Publisher children's Book of the Year: Whisper, Lynette Noni
- The Matt Richell award for new writer of the Year: Boy Swallows Universe, Trent Dalton
- Book of the Year for older children (ages 13+): Jane Doe and the Cradle of All Worlds, Jeremy Lachlan
- Book of the Year for younger children (ages seven to 12): The 104-Storey Treehouse, Andy Griffiths, Terry Denton
- Children's picture Book of the Year (ages up to six): All the Ways to be Smart, Davina Bell and Allison Colpoys
- Audiobook of the Year: Boy Swallows Universe, Trent Dalton, Narrator Stig Wemyss
- The Lloyd O'Neill hall of fame award for services to the Australian book industry: Richard Walsh
- The Pixie O'Harris award for outstanding commitment to children’s literature: Kathy Kozlowski
- Publisher of the Year: Pan Macmillan Australia
- Small Publisher of the Year: Affirm Press
- Honourable mention: Magabala Books
- National book retailer of the Year: Booktopia
- Independent book retailer of the Year: Mary Martin Bookshops
- Rising star award: Ella Chapman, head of marketing communications at Hachette Australia

== 2020 winners ==
The 2020 awards were announced at a virtual event hosted by Casey Bennetto on 13 May. Winners were:

- ABIA Book of the Year: Bluey: The Beach, Ludo Studio, BBC Studios and PRH Australia
- Biography of the Year award: When All is Said & Done by Neale Daniher
- General Fiction Book of the Year: Bruny, Heather Rose
- General Non-fiction Book of the Year: Kitty Flanagan’s 488 Rules for Life, Kitty Flanagan
- Literary Fiction Book of the Year: The Weekend, Charlotte Wood
- Illustrated Book of the Year: The Whole Fish Cookbook, Josh Niland
- International Book of the Year: The Testaments, Margaret Atwood
- Small Publisher adults Book of the Year: Sand Talk, Tyson Yunkaporta
- Small Publisher children's Book of the Year: Love Your Body, Jessica Saunders, illustrated by Carol Rossetti
- The Matt Richell award for new writer of the Year: Your Own Kind of Girl, Clare Bowditch
- Book of the Year for older children (ages 13+): Welcome To Your Period, Yumi Stynes and Melissa Kang
- Book of the Year for younger children (ages seven to 12): The 117-Storey Treehouse, Andy Griffiths, Terry Denton
- Children's picture Book of the Year (ages up to six): Bluey: The Beach, Ludo Studio, BBC Studios and PRH Australia
- Audiobook of the Year: No Friend But the Mountains: Writing from Manus Prison, Behrouz Boochani. Narrators: Benjamin Law, Omid Tofighian, Isobelle Carmody, Janet Galbraith, Mathilda Imlah, Geoffrey Robertson, Richard Flanagan, Sarah Dale, Thomas Keneally and Yumi Stynes
- The Lloyd O'Neill hall of fame award for services to the Australian book industry: Helen Garner
- The Pixie O'Harris award for outstanding commitment to children’s literature: Erica Wagner
- Publisher of the Year: Allen & Unwin
- Small Publisher of the Year: Magabala Books
- Bookshop of the Year: Books Kinokuniya
- Book retailer of the Year: Readings
- Rising star award: Hazel Lam, senior book designer at HarperCollins

== 2021 winners ==
The 2021 awards were announced at Carriageworks on 28 April at an in-person and virtual event hosted by Casey Bennetto. Winners were:

- ABIA Book of the Year: Phosphorescence, Julia Baird
- Biography of the Year award: The Happiest Man on Earth, Eddie Jaku
- General Fiction Book of the Year: The Dictionary of Lost Words, Pip Williams
- General Non-fiction Book of the Year: Phosphorescence, Julia Baird
- Literary Fiction Book of the Year: A Lonely Girl is a Dangerous Thing, Jessie Tu
- Illustrated Book of the Year: In Praise of Veg, Alice Zaslavsky
- International Book of the Year: Such a Fun Age, Kiley Reid
- Small Publisher adults Book of the Year: The Animals in That Country, Laura Jean McKay
- Small Publisher children's Book of the Year: Bindi, Kirli Saunders, illustrated by Dub Leffler
- The Matt Richell award for new writer of the Year: The Coconut Children, Vivian Pham
- Book of the Year for older children (ages 13+): The Left-Handed Booksellers of London, Garth Nix
- Book of the Year for younger children (ages seven to 12): The Grandest Bookshop in the World, Amelia Mellor
- Children's picture Book of the Year (ages up to six): Our Home, Our Heartbeat (Adam Briggs, Kate Moon and Rachael Sarra
- Audiobook of the Year: Tell Me Why, Archie Roach, narrated by the author
- The Lloyd O'Neill hall of fame award for services to the Australian book industry: Mandy Macky
- The Pixie O'Harris award for outstanding commitment to children’s literature: Maryann Ballantyne
- Publisher of the Year: Penguin Random House Australia
- Small Publisher of the Year: University of Queensland Press
- Bookshop of the Year: Avid Reader, Brisbane
- Book retailer of the Year: Readings
- Rising star award: Pooja Desai, head of design at Hardie Grant Children’s Publishing

== 2022 winners ==
The 2022 shortlist was announced on 25 May 2022, and the awards ceremony took place at ICC Sydney on 9 June 2022.

The winners were:

- Small Publisher of the Year: University of Queensland Press (UQP)
- Publisher of the Year: Penguin Random House Australia
- Bookshop of the Year: Avenue Bookstore, Albert Park, Melbourne
- Book Retailer of the Year: Harry Hartog Bookseller, Burnside Village, Adelaide
- Audiobook of the Year: Devotion by Hannah Kent; narrated by Emily Wheaton (Macmillan)
- Biography Book of the Year: My Adventurous Life by Dick Smith (Allen & Unwin)
- Book of the Year for Older Children: The Prison Healer by Lynette Noni (Penguin Random House Australia)
- Book of the Year for Younger Children: The First Scientists: Deadly Inventions and Innovations from Australia's First Peoples by Corey Tutt (Hardie Grant Publishing)
- Picture Book of the Year (Ages 0–6): Somebody's Land: Welcome to Our Country by Adam Goodes and Ellie Laing, illustrated by David Hardy (Allen & Unwin)
- General Fiction Book of the Year: Before You Knew My Name by Jacqueline Bublitz (Allen & Unwin)
- General Non-Fiction Book of the Year: She's on the Money by Victoria Devine (Penguin Random House Australia)
- Illustrated Book of the Year: Everything I Love to Cook by Neil Perry (Murdoch Books)
- International Book of the Year: The Storyteller by Dave Grohl (Simon & Schuster)
- Literary Fiction Book of the Year: Love & Virtue by Diana Reid (Ultimo Press)
- Small Publishers' Adult Book of the Year: Dropbear by Evelyn Araluen (University of Queensland Press)
- Small Publishers' Children's Book of the Year: The Edge of Thirteen by Nova Weetman (UQP)
- Matt Richell Award for New Writer of the Year: The Mother Wound by Amani Haydar (Pan Macmillan Australia)
- Rising Star Award: Emily Hart, Commissioning Editor, Hardie Grant Books
- Hall of Fame Awards – Lloyd O'Neil Award: Sandy Grant, CEO Hardie Grant
- Hall of Fame Awards – Pixie O'Harris Award: Libby Hathorn

== 2023 winners ==
The 2023 shortlist was announced on 19 April 2023, and the awards ceremony took place in Sydney on 25 May 2023.

The winners were:

- Small Publisher of the Year: University of Queensland Press (UQP)
- Publisher of the Year: Allen & Unwin
- Bookshop of the Year: Matilda Bookshop
- Book Retailer of the Year: Big W
- Audiobook of the Year: The Whitewash by Siang Lu (Wavesound)
- Social Impact Book of the Year: The Boy from Boomerang Crescent by Eddie Betts (Simon & Schuster)
- Biography Book of the Year: My Dream Time by Ash Barty (HarperCollins)
- Book of the Year for Older Children: Blood Traitor by Lynette Noni (Penguin)
- Book of the Year for Younger Children: Runt by Craig Silvey, illustrated by Sara Acton (Allen & Unwin)
- Picture Book of the Year (Ages 0–6): What to Say When You Don’t Know What to Say by Davina Bell and Hilary Jean Tapper (Lothian)
- General Fiction Book of the Year: Dirt Town by Hayley Scrivenor (Macmillan)
- General Non-Fiction Book of the Year: Bulldozed by Niki Savva (Scribe)
- Illustrated Book of the Year: RecipeTin Eats: Dinner by Nagi Maehashi (Macmillan)
- International Book of the Year: Lessons in Chemistry by Bonnie Gamus (Doubleday UK)
- Literary Fiction Book of the Year: Horse by Geraldine Brooks (Hachette)
- Small Publishers' Adult Book of the Year: The Dreaming Path by Paul Callaghan (Pantera)
- Small Publishers' Children's Book of the Year: Off to the Market by Alice Oehr (Scribble)
- Matt Richell Award for New Writer of the Year: WAKE by Shelley Burr (Hachette Australia)
- Commissioning editor of the Year: Jane Palfreyman (Allen & Unwin)
- Marketing strategy of the Year: Stolen Focus by Johann Hari (Bloomsbury)
- Hall of Fame Awards – Lloyd O'Neil Award: Tim Winton
- Hall of Fame Awards – Pixie O'Harris Award: Lisa Berryman

== 2024 winners ==
The 2024 awards ceremony took place in Melbourne on 9 May 2024.

The winners were:

- ABIA Book of the Year: The Voice to Parliament Handbook, by Thomas Mayo and Kerry O'Brien (Hardie Grant Publishing)
- Audio Book of the Year: The Teacher's Pet, written and narrated by Hedley Thomas (Macmillan Australia Audio, Pan Macmillan Australia)
- Biography Book of the Year: Wifedom: Mrs Orwell's Invisible Life, by Anna Funder (Hamish Hamilton, Penguin Random House Australia)
- Book of the Year for Older Children (ages 13+): Welcome to Sex, written by Melissa Kang and Yumi Stynes, illustrated by Jenny Latham (HGCP Non- Fiction, Hardie Grant Children's Publishing)
- Book of the Year for Younger Children (ages 7–12): It's the Sound of the Thing, by Maxine Beneba Clarke (HGCP Older Readers, Hardie Grant Children's Publishing)
- Children's Picture Book of the Year (ages 0–6): A Life Song, written by Jane Godwin, illustrated Anna Walker (Puffin, Penguin Random House Australia)
- General Fiction Book of the Year: The Bookbinder of Jericho, by Pip Williams (Affirm Press)
- General Non-Fiction Book of the Year: The Voice to Parliament Handbook, by Thomas Mayo and Kerry O'Brien (Hardie Grant Explore, Hardie Grant Publishing)
- Illustrated Book of the Year: Australian Abstract, by Amber Creswell Bell (Thames & Hudson Australia, Thames & Hudson)
- International Book of the Year: Fourth Wing, by Rebecca Yarros (Piatkus, Hachette Australia)
- Literary Fiction Book of the Year: Lola in the Mirror, by Trent Dalton (4th Estate, HarperCollins Publishers)
- Small Publishers' Adult Book of the Year: Edenglassie, by Melissa Lucashenko (University of Queensland Press)
- Small Publishers' Children's Book of the Year: Artichoke to Zucchini: an alphabet of delicious things from around the world, by Alice Oehr (Scribble, Scribe Publications)
- Social Impact Book of the Year: The Voice to Parliament Handbook, Thomas Mayo and Kerry O'Brien (Hardie Grant Explore, Hardie Grant Publishing)
- The Matt Richell Award for New Writer of the Year: Green Dot, by Madeleine Gray (Allen & Unwin)
- Lloyd O'Neil Hall of Fame Award: Fiona Stager, co-owner of Avid Reader and Where the Wild Things Are
- Pixie O'Harris Award: Jane Godwin
- Commissioning Editor of the Year: Catherine Milne (HarperCollins Publishers)
- Marketing Strategy of the Year: The Bookbinder of Jericho (Affirm Press)
- Small Publisher of the Year: Magabala Books
- Publisher of the Year: Penguin Random House Australia
- Bookshop of the Year: Fullers Bookshop, Hobart Tasmania

== 2025 winners ==
The 2025 awards ceremony took place in Melbourne on 7 May 2025.

The winners were:

- ABIA Book of the Year: The Voice Inside, by John Farnham with Poppy Stockell (Hachette)
- Audio Book of the Year: The Voice Inside, by John Farnham with Poppy Stockell, narrated by John Farnham, Jill Farnham and Gaynor Wheatley (Squaresound)
- Biography Book of the Year: The Voice Inside, by John Farnham with Poppy Stockell (Hachette)
- John Marsden Book of the Year for Older Children (ages 13+): My Family and Other Suspects by Kate Emery (Allen & Unwin)
- Book of the Year for Younger Children (ages 7–12): Wurrtoo by Tylissa Elisara, illustrated by Dylan Finney (Lothian)
- Children's Picture Book of the Year (ages 0–6): The Truck Cat by Deborah Frenkel, illustrated by Danny Snell (Bright Light)
- General Fiction Book of the Year: What Happened to Nina? by Dervla McTiernan (HarperCollins)
- General Non-Fiction Book of the Year: The Chairman's Lounge by Joe Aston (Scribner)
- Illustrated Book of the Year: RecipeTin Eats: Tonight by Nagi Maehashi (Macmillan)
- International Book of the Year: The Ministry of Time by Kaliane Bradley (Sceptre)
- Literary Fiction Book of the Year: Dusk by Robbie Arnott (Picador)
- Small Publishers' Adult Book of the Year: All I Ever Wanted Was to Be Hot by Lucinda Price (Pantera)
- Small Publishers' Children's Book of the Year: Leo and Ralph by Peter Carnavas (University of Queensland Press)
- Social Impact Book of the Year: Brainstorm by Richard Scolyer with Garry Maddox (Allen & Unwin)
- The Matt Richell Award for New Writer of the Year: We Are the Stars by Gina Chick (Summit)
- Lloyd O'Neil Hall of Fame Award: Ross Gibb
- Pixie O'Harris Award: Rachel Bin Salleh
- Commissioning Editor of the Year: Jeanmarie Morosin
- Marketing Strategy of the Year: Personal Penguin campaign (PRH)
- Small Publisher of the Year: University of Queensland Press
- Publisher of the Year: Penguin Random House Australia
- Bookshop of the Year: Potts Point Bookshop

== 2026 winners ==
The 2026 awards ceremony took place in Melbourne on 21 May 2026.

The winners were:

- ABIA Book of the Year: Once I Was a Giant by Zeno Sworder, (Thames & Hudson)
- Audio Book of the Year: Mad Mabel by Sally Hepworth, narrated by Hannah Fredericksen and Jenny Seedsman (Macmillan Australia Audio)
- Biography Book of the Year: Memorial Days by Geraldine Brooks (Hachette)
- John Marsden Book of the Year for Older Children (ages 13+): Wandering Wild by Lynette Noni (Penguin)
- Book of the Year for Younger Children (ages 7–12): Caution! This Book Contains Deadly Reptiles by Corey Tutt, illustrated by Ben Williams (Allen & Unwin)
- Children's Picture Book of the Year (ages 0–6): Once I Was a Giant by Zeno Sworder (Thames & Hudson)
- General Fiction Book of the Year: Mad Mabel by Sally Hepworth (Macmillan)
- General Non-Fiction Book of the Year: The Mushroom Tapes by Helen Garner, Chloe Hooper and Sarah Krasnostein (Text Publishing)
- Illustrated Book of the Year: The Art of Kaylene Whiskey: Do You Believe in Love? by Natalie King and Iwantja Arts (Thames & Hudson)
- International Book of the Year: Heart the Lover by Lily King (Canongate)
- Literary Fiction Book of the Year: Wild Dark Shore by Charlotte McConaghy (Penguin)
- Small Publishers' Adult Book of the Year: The Rot by Evelyn Araluen (University of Queensland Press)
- Small Publishers' Children's Book of the Year: Sundays Under the Lemon Tree by Julia Busuttil Nishimura, illustrated by Myo Yim (Scribble)
- Social Impact Book of the Year: A Piece of Red Cloth by Leonie Norrington, Merrkiyawuy Ganambarr-Stubbs, Djawa Burarrwanga and Djawundil Maymuru (Allen & Unwin)
- The Matt Richell Award for New Writer of the Year: Melaleuca by Angie Faye Martin (University of Queensland Press)
- Lloyd O'Neil Hall of Fame Award: Paul Macdonald
- Pixie O'Harris Award: Mem Fox
- Commissioning Editor/Publisher of the Year: Vanessa Radnidge (Hachette Australia)
- Marketing Strategy of the Year: Cherry Lam Colouring Book Series (Penguin Random House Australia)
- Children's Publisher of the Year: Magabala Books
- Small Publisher of the Year: Magabala Books
- Publisher of the Year: Penguin Random House Australia
- Bookshop of the Year: Gleebooks Dulwich Hill
- Book Retailer of the Year: Readings
- Multicategory Retail of the Year: BIG W
