= Alice Eather =

Alice Pearl Daiguma Eather (1988/1989 – 4 June 2017) was an Aboriginal Australian slam poet, environmental campaigner, and teacher.

== Early life and education ==
Alice Pearl Daiguma Eather was born in 1988 or 1989 in Brisbane, Queensland, to Helen Djimbarrwala Willams and Michael Eather, an artist and gallery-owner with European ancestors who arrived on the Second Fleet.

She was educated in Brisbane.

== Career ==
Eather moved to Maningrida, Northern Territory to become the first Ndjebbana-speaking Aboriginal teacher, and performed as a slam poet.

In writing, she contributed poetry to the anthology Growing Up Aboriginal In Australia (2018), edited by Anita Heiss.

== Activism ==
In 2013 Eather started Protect Arnhem Land, an anti-fracking campaign group against Paltar Petroleum. It was successful in convincing the Northern Territory government to suspend the application pending agreement with the local population; further campaigning eventually led to Paltar withdrawing the application in 2016.

== Recognition ==
In 2014 Eather received the Northern Territory Young Achiever's Environment Award for her work in preventing oil exploration of Arnhem Land.

She appeared in the ABC television programme The Word: Rise of the Slam Poets.

== Death ==
Eather died aged 28 on 4 June 2017 in Maningrida as a result of suicide, after having suffered from anxiety and depression on and off throughout her life. She was close to her two sisters, Noni and Grace.
