= Growing Up Aboriginal in Australia =

Australian 2018 anthology

- Editor: Anita Heiss
- Authors: various
- Language: English
- Genre: Anthology, memoir
- Publisher: Black Inc
- Publication date: April 16, 2018
- Publication place: Australia
- Pages: 320
- ISBN: 9781863959810

Growing Up Aboriginal in Australia is a 2018 biographical anthology compiled and edited by Anita Heiss and published by Black Inc. It includes 52 short written pieces by Aboriginal Australians from many walks of life and discusses issues like Australian history of colonisation and assimilation, activism, significance of country, culture and language, identity and intersectionality, family, and racism. Notable contributors include poet Tony Birch, singer Deborah Cheetham, Australian rules footballer Adam Goodes, and actress Miranda Tapsell. The book won the 2019 Small Publishers' Adult Book of the Year award at the Australian Book Industry Awards.

== Background ==
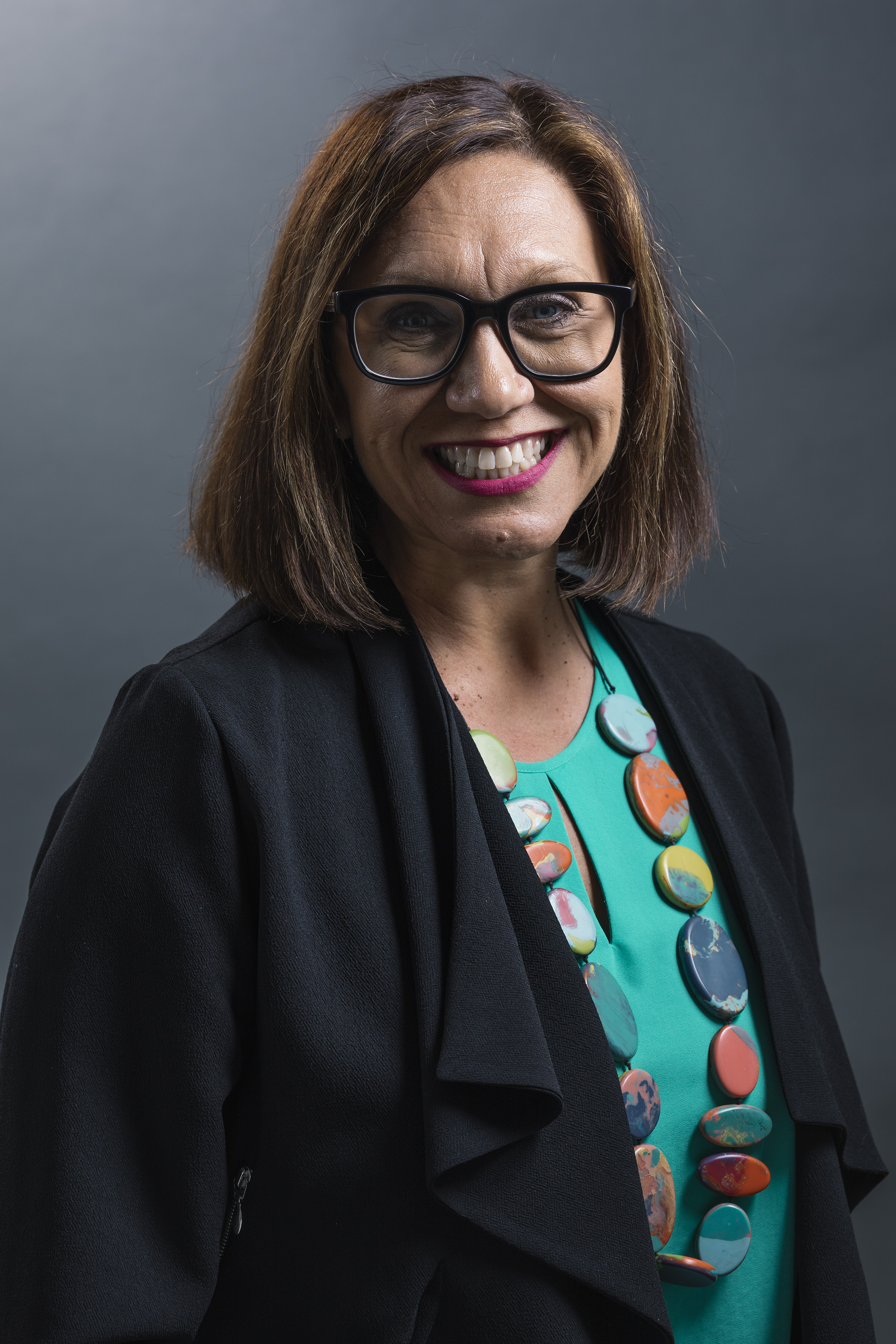
Heiss in 2017

Anita Heiss is an Aboriginal Australian author of non-fiction, historical fiction, poetry, and social commentary and is of Wiradjuri heritage. She is a longtime advocate for Indigenous Australian literature and a Lifetime Ambassador of the Indigenous Literacy Foundation. Heiss was inspired to create an anthology of true stories by her desire to "showcase as many of the diverse voices, experiences and stories together as possible."

Black Inc, an imprint of Carlton-based Schwartz Publishing, took on the Growing Up Aboriginal in Australia project and sent a callout for non-fiction contributions. Heiss and publisher Aviva Tuffield received over 120 submissions from people of varying ages and geographical locations, with those chosen for the project expressing "numerous communal connections and shared experiences that frame common themes, including the importance and influence of identity, the stolen generations, family and kinship, education, concepts of country and place, and sport." The large number of submissions showed Heiss that "many want[ed] mainstream Australia to understand what it's like to 'grow up Aboriginal'."

Some authors were published for the first time in Growing Up Aboriginal in Australia, whilst others – like Tony Birch, Ambelin Kwaymullina, and Tara June Winch – were experienced writers. Some Aboriginal Australian celebrities also authored chapters in the book, namely film and television stars Deborah Cheetham and Miranda Tapsell, and sportsmen Adam Goodes and Patrick Johnson.

== Contents ==
The authors and their contributed chapters for Growing Up Aboriginal in Australia are listed below.

Chapter No.	Title	Author(s)	No. of pages
–	Introduction	Anita Heiss	3
1	'Two Twiddas'	Susie and Alice Anderson	7
2	'Finding Ways Home'	Evelyn Araluen	4
3	'It's Not Over'	Bebe Backhouse	5
4	'My Story'	Alicia Bates	5
5	'Dear Australia'	Don Bemrose	5
6	'My Father Has a Story'	Tony Birch	7
7	Poem: 'Scenes of Domestic Life (A Saturday Night Middleweight)'	Tony Birch	1
8	Poem: 'Away (The Warmed Hollow)'	Tony Birch	2
9	'Murri + Migloo = Meeks Mob'	Norleen Brinkworth	7
10	'Easter, 1969'	Katie Bryan	10
11	'So Much Still Pending'	Deborah Cheetham	7
12	'This Is Nat, She's Abo'	Natalie Cromb	5
13	'Thanks for the Childhood Travels'	Karen Davis	4
14	'Growing Up Beige'	Ian Dudley	5
15	'Yuya Karrabura'	Alice Eather	10
16	'White Bread Dreaming'	Shannon Foster	7
17	'There Are No Halves'	Jason Goninan	7
18	'The Sporting Life'	Adam Goodes	4
19	'A Tasmanian Toomelah Tiger'	Jodie Haines	5
20	'I Remember'	Karranjal John Hartley	6
21	'The Streets of My Youth'	Terri Janke	4
22	'What It's Like'	Keira Jenkins	6
23	'My Life's Voyage'	Patrick Johnson	3
24	'Red Dust Kids'	Scott Kennedy	4
25	'December 21'	Sharon Kingaby	4
26	'Growing up, Grow up, Grown-Ups'	Ambelin Kwaymullina	2
27	'Far Enough Away to Be on My Way Back Home'	Jack Latimore	9
28	'Black Bum'	Celeste Liddle	7
29	'Recognised'	Matthew Lillyst	4
30	'Just a Young Girl'	Taryn Little	2
31	'Stranger Danger'	Amy McQuire	4
32	'Grey'	Melanie Mununggurr-Williams	5
33	'Different Times'	Doreen Nelson	9
34	'When Did You First Realise You Were Aboriginal?'	Sharon Payne	3
35	'Abo Nose'	Zachary Penrith-Puchalski	5
36	'Too White to Be Black, Too Black to Be White'	Carol Pettersen	5
37	'Living Between Two Knowledge Systems'	Todd Phillips	6
38	'The Little Town on the Railway Track'	Kerry Reed-Gilbert	6
39	'A Story From My Life'	W. Les Russell	8
40	'Cronulla to Papunya'	Marlee Silva	8
41	'Letterbox-Gate'	Liza-Mare Syron	7
42	'From Marree to the City'	Frank Szekely	3
43	'Nobody Puts Baby Spice in a Corner'	Miranda Tapsell	7
44	'Daredevil Days'	Jared Thomas	8
45	'Finding My Belonging'	Ceane G. Towers	5
46	'My Childhood'	Aileen Walsh	5
47	'Life Lessons, or Something Like Them'	Shahni Wellington	8
48	'It's Too Hot'	Alexis West	2
49	'Aboriginemo'	Alison Whittaker	7
50	'Split Affinity'	John Williams-Mozley	7
51	'First, Second, Third, Fourth'	Tara June Winch	4
52	'The Aboriginal Equation'	Tamika Worrell	3

Brisbane-born slam poet, environmental campaigner and teacher Alice Eather, who wrote Chapter 15 entitled 'Yuya Karrabura", committed suicide on June 4, 2017 at age 28, whilst the book was still being compiled. In the introduction, Anita Heiss pays tribute to Eather's contribution to the anthology and "her work as a poet and a community role model."

On August 8, 2019 Natalie Cromb – author of Chapter 12, 'This Is Nat, She's Abo' – appeared on the ABC current affairs program The Drum and shared her story.

== Reception ==
Writing for The Conversation on September 5, 2018, Jacinta Elston noted the multiple backgrounds of the book's many contributors and the depth of its content, stating that Growing Up Aboriginal in Australia is "a collection of stories that speaks to the strength of Aboriginal identity in Australia today, as well as the diversity of voices in the long marginalised Aboriginal literary community."

George Delaney, writing for Australian retailer and review site Readings, agreed with Elston's sentiment about authorial variety, stating Growing Up Aboriginal in Australia "highlights the enormous diversity in the life stories of Aboriginal people in Australia, from those who grew up in middle-class suburbia to those in self-determined communities, to missions and reserves, to small communities in remote areas." Delaney continued, explaining that "Each story is full of nuance and answers all sorts of questions, in beautifully complex ways, about Aboriginal experiences in contemporary Australia that often go unasked."

An article on the ACT Government website praised Growing Up Aboriginal in Australia, stating that "the diverse voices, experiences and stories" in the anthology "will enlighten, inspire and educate us all about the lives of Aboriginal people in Australia today." The article held particular acclaim for the contribution of Canberra-native Don Bemrose, an epistolary memoir entitled 'Dear Australia' which is "a powerful piece, beautifully written that will give the reader goosebumps as [Bemrose] shares commentary of his many achievements and challenges."

== See also ==
- Growing Up Asian in Australia
