= The Rot (book) =

2025 Australian poetry collection

- Author: Evelyn Araluen
- Language: English
- Publisher: University of Queensland Press
- Publication date: 4 November 2025
- ISBN: 9780702268960

The Rot is a 2025 collection of poetry and prose by Evelyn Araluen, an Aboriginal Australian poet of the Bundjalung people. It was published by the University of Queensland Press. It received the 2026 Victorian Prize for Literature, the 2026 Victorian Premier's Literary Awards – Indigenous Writing award, and the ABIA 2026 Small Publishers' Adult Book of the Year. It was shortlisted for the 2026 Prime Minister's Literary Award for Poetry and the 2026 Stella Prize, amongst other honours.

== Critical reception ==
Writing for The Guardian, Alison Croggan describes the collection as an "experiential plunge into the nightmare of the present moment". The Rot considers colonialism and postcolonialism, the "livestreamed" siege on Gaza, womanhood, girlhood, and personal and digital archives.

Thomas Ford from The Conversation, described the collection as "an almost lyric novel in its sustained attention to the feeling or effect of politics today" offering readers an "eerie insomniac beauty, attuned precisely to our dark times.

== Awards ==
Awards for The Rot
Year	Award	Result	Ref.
2026	Victorian Prize for Literature	Winner	
2026	Victorian Premier's Literary Award for Indigenous Writing	Winner	
2026	ABIA Small Publishers' Adult Book of the Year	Winner	
2026	Prime Minister's Literary Award for Poetry	Shortlisted	
2026	Stella Prize	Shortlisted	
