= Burnside Village =

Shopping centre in Adelaide, Australia

Coordinates: 34°56′28″S 138°38′30″E

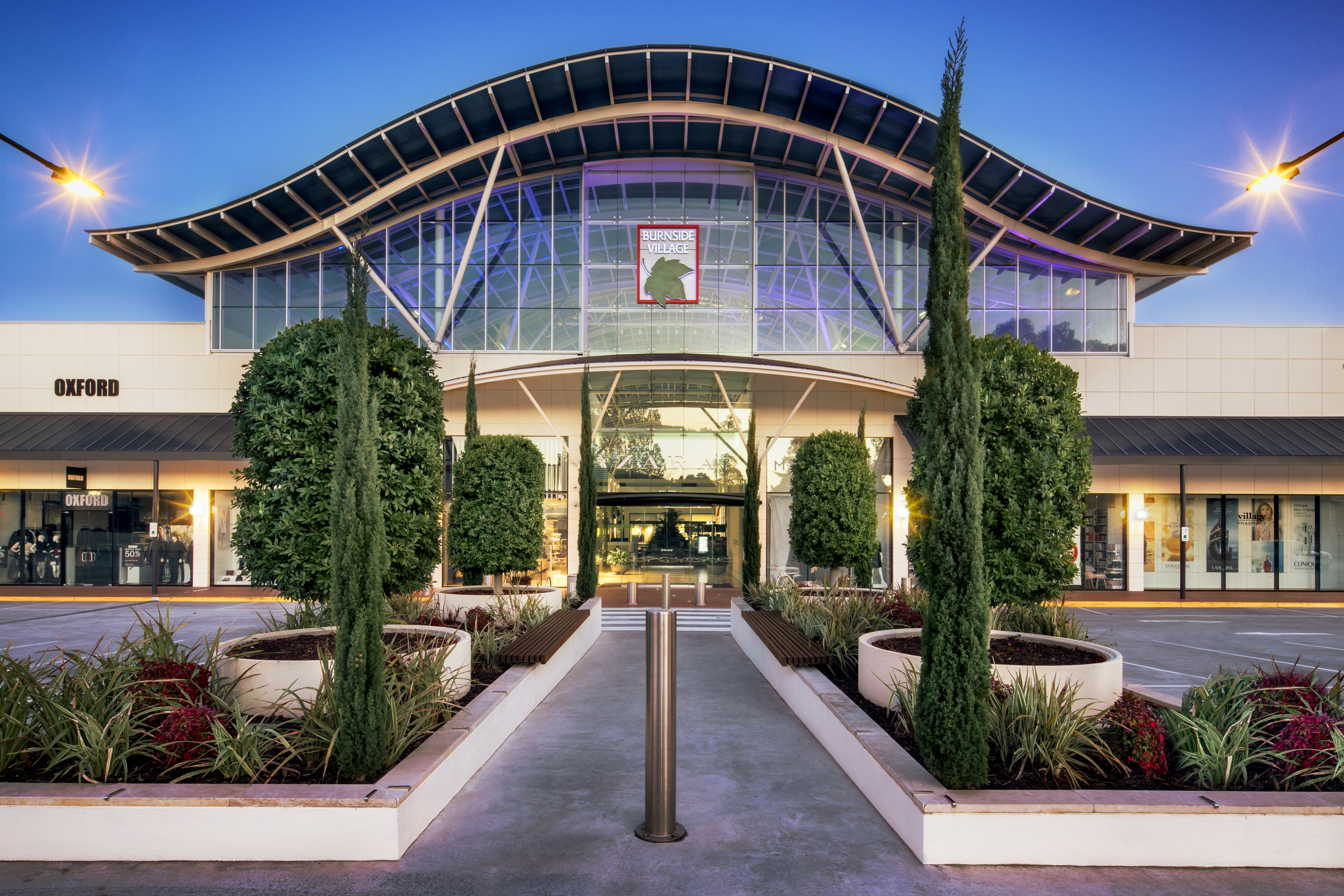
The Burnside Village shopping centre

Burnside Village is a premium shopping centre located in the suburb of Glenside in Adelaide, South Australia. It is situated within the City of Burnside local government area.

Burnside Village is home to prestigious stores such as Zara, Tommy Hilfiger, Louis Vuitton, Dior, Watches of Switzerland, Tiffany & Co., Ralph Lauren, Oroton, and many others.

== History ==
Burnside Village began as a ribbon development shopping centre, at the Corner of Portrush and Greenhill Roads. It origins included two small supermarkets along the Portrush Road frontage and a set of shops to the rear. During the 1980s, sections of the surrounding block were bought up and the current site was redeveloped. It included an underground carpark and integrated the old supermarkets into specialty stores. The new section included a Coles supermarket, food specialty stores and niche clothing and homeware stores. Burnside Village is currently home to over 100 stores, including a large Coles Supermarket on the south side.

== Stage 3 ==
In November 2011, the Cohen Group unveiled Burnside Village’s new $100 million development. Designed by The Buchan Group (architects), it added 7,300m^{2} to Burnside Village and increased parking to 1,156, taking the centre to 120 shops, and about 20,000m^{2} of retail space, including Adelaide's first Zara store.

Stage 4 was also completed in 2011 which included the replacement of the original polycarbonate roof, the entire mall tiles and the replacement of the no#1 travelator. Other amenity upgrades were added to this scope.

Stage 5 was completed in 2019 which included a refresh of the Food Mall and Village Market.

Construction of Stage 6 commenced in 2022. It covers a site in the northern part of the centre bound by Portrush Rd, Greenhill Rd and Sydney St. Its design introduces new upper-levels of retail, creates a strong facade to Greenhill Rd and will incorporate a combination of premium fashion, lifestyle, food (dine in), potential gastro-pub style dining (with rooftop bar), medical centre, entertainment options and gym.
