= Davina Bell =

Australian children's writer and book editor

- Born: Perth, Western Australia
- Education: RMIT University
- Writing career
- Notable work: The End of the World Is Bigger than Love
- Notable awards: Ethel Turner Prize for Young People's Literature, 2021; CBCA Book of the Year Awards — Book of the Year: Older Readers, 2021

Davina Bell is an Australian literary editor and children's writer. Her 2020 book, The End of the World Is Bigger than Love, won a New South Wales Premier's Literary Award in 2021.

== Early life and education ==
Bell was born in Perth, Western Australia. She graduated in law at university there, but then enrolled in Professional Writing and Editing at RMIT University in Melbourne.

== Career ==
With two others, Bell co-founded the literary journal Harvest and published its first edition in 2008.

She was children's editor at Penguin, where she worked on their list with authors including Mem Fox and Margaret Wild. She subsequently moved Affirm Press to edit their children's list of writers including Alison Lester and Jane Godwin and then to Allen & Unwin where she work on their children and young-adult list.

=== Writing ===
Bell wrote a series of four books set in 1918 about a West Australian girl called Alice, who wanted to be a dancer. The stories part of Penguin's Our Australian Girl series and were republished in 2014 as The Alice stories.

Her next book, The Underwater Fancy-Dress Parade, won the 2016 Australian Book Industry Awards Small Publishers' children's book of the year, as well as two book design awards for its illustrator/designer Allison Colpoys.

Her 2018 book, All the Ways to be Smart, won the Children's picture book of the year at the 2019 Australian Book Industry Awards.

At the 2021 New South Wales Premier's Literary Awards she won the Ethel Turner Prize for Young People's Literature for The End of the World Is Bigger than Love. She also won the 2021 CBCA Book of the Year for older readers for the same book.

Five of her books have been named Notable Books at the CBCA Book of the Year Awards and her works have been shortlisted for many other Australian literary awards.

== Selected works ==
=== Stand-alone ===
- Bell, Davina (29 February 2016). The underwater fancy-dress parade. Colpoys, Allison (illustrator). Scribe Publications (published 2014). ISBN 978-1-925321-27-2.
- —— (18 July 2016). Oh, Albert!. Acton, Sara (illustrator). Penguin/Viking (published 2016). ISBN 978-0-670-07860-8.
- —— (27 February 2017). Under the love umbrella. Colpoys, Allison (illustrator). Scribble (published 2017). ISBN 978-1-925321-26-5.
- —— (15 October 2018). All the ways to be smart. Colpoys, Allison (illustrator). Scribble (published 2018). ISBN 978-1-925713-43-5.
- —— (September 2019). The secret life of Lola. Hardie Grant Egmont (published 2019). ISBN 978-1-76050-403-8.
- —— (October 2019). All of the factors of why I love tractors. Lovlie, Jenny (illustrator). Little Hare Books (published 2019). ISBN 978-1-76050-145-7.
- —— (2020). How to be a Real Ballerina. Lovlie, Jenny (illustrator). Little Hare Books.
- —— (2 June 2020). The End of the World Is Bigger than Love. Text Publishing (published 2020). ISBN 978-1-925923-35-3.
- —— (9 November 2021). Tomorrow is a brand-new day. Colpoys, Allison (illustrator). Scribble (published 2021). ISBN 978-1-925849-46-2.

=== The Alice series ===
- Bell, Davina (2012). Meet Alice. Masciullo, Lucia (illustrator). Penguin Group Australia. ISBN 978-0-14-330629-0.
- —— (26 April 2012). Alice and the Apple Blossom Fair. Masciullo, Lucia (illustrator). Penguin Group Australia (published 2012). ISBN 978-1-74253-511-1.
- —— (2 July 2012). Alice of Peppermint Grove. Masciullo, Lucia (illustrator). Penguin Group Australia (published 2012). ISBN 978-1-74253-568-5.
- —— (22 August 2012). Peacetime for Alice. Masciullo, Lucia (illustrator). Penguin Group Australia (published 2012). ISBN 978-1-74253-642-2.

=== Corner Park Clubhouse series ===
- Bell, Davina (September 2020). Sophia and the Corner Park clubhouse. Hardie Grant Egmont (published 2019). ISBN 978-1-76050-397-0.
- —— (September 2019). The secret life of Lola. Hardie Grant Egmont (published 2019). ISBN 978-1-76050-403-8.

=== Lemonade Jones series ===
- Bell, Davina (29 August 2018). Lemonade Jones. Blair, Karen (illustrator). Allen & Unwin (published 2018). ISBN 978-1-925266-73-3.
- —— (2019). Lemonade Jones and the great school fete. Blair, Karen (illustrator). Allen & Unwin. ISBN 978-1-925266-74-0.
