= Jan Goodwin =

American investigative journalist

- Occupation: Investigative journalist

Jan Goodwin is an author and investigative journalist with a focus on war, conflict and human rights, women's issues and the Islamic world. Her journalistic career has been committed to focusing attention on social justice and human rights, both international and domestic.

She has covered wars and unrest in Afghanistan, Angola, Bosnia, Cambodia, Democratic Republic of Congo, El Salvador, Ethiopia, Iran, Iraq, Kosovo, the Middle East and Gulf, Northern Ireland, Sierra Leone, South Africa, Sri Lanka and Uganda.

A longtime human-rights activist and the recipient of three Amnesty International UK Media Awards, Goodwin has testified before Congress on a number of occasions. She served on the White House’s National Cambodian Crisis Committee, created in 1980 as a clearing house for donations and relief efforts. Other national honors include a Frontpage Award for Outstanding Journalism for her "War Torn" series; a Clarion for an anti-child pornography series, and two Emmas for political coverage. Goodwin is the winner of the World Hunger Award and is a Soros Foundation Media Fellow, and a Senior Fellow at Brandeis University’s Schuster Institute for Investigative Journalism.

She was a reporter on and off camera for Defending Our Daughters, an award-winning documentary by two-time Academy Award winner Barbara Kopple on women's international human rights. Narrated by Meryl Streep, the film was shown on Lifetime Television.

In a break from journalism, Goodwin started and ran Save the Children's Peshawar-based multimillion dollar humanitarian program in war-torn Afghanistan for four years. Funded by USAID, the UN and the EU, projects included reconstruction of bomb-damaged infrastructure, including schools, hospitals and clinics; transporting humanitarian aid under war-torn conditions; mother and child health; income-generating and microenterprise. Goodwin's involvement with SCF-US was an outgrowth of her longtime human rights activism.

== Selected works ==
- Caught in the Crossfire (E.P. Dutton, 1987)
- Price of Honor (Little, Brown, 1994, updated 2003)
