= Overland (magazine) =

Australian literary magazine

- Spring 2008 cover
- Editor: Evelyn Araluen and Jonathan Dunk
- Former editors: Jacinda Woodhead
- Categories: Literature, culture
- Frequency: Quarterly & online
- Total circulation (2004): 2000
- Founded: 1954
- Country: Australia
- Based in: Melbourne
- Language: English
- Website: overland.org.au
- ISSN: 0030-7416

Overland is an Australian literary and cultural magazine, established in 1954 and as of April 2020 published quarterly in print as well as online.

== History ==
Overland was established in 1954, under the auspices of the Realist Writers Group in Melbourne, with Stephen Murray-Smith as the first editor-in-chief. It was initially formed by anti-Stalinist members of the Communist Party of Australia and other members of the 1950s New Left.

=== Editors ===
The magazine has been edited by:

- Stephen Murray-Smith, 1954–1988
- Barrett Reid, 1988–1993
- John McLaren, Spring 1993 – Autumn 1997
- Ian Syson, Winter 1997 – Summer 2002
- Nathan Hollier and Katherine Wilson, Autumn 2002 – Spring 2004
- Nathan Hollier, 2005–2006
- Jeff Sparrow, 2007–2014
- Jacinda Woodhead, 2015–2019
- Evelyn Araluen and Jonathan Dunk, since 2019

== Description ==
Overland describes itself as "Australia’s oldest radical literary magazine", which publishes fiction, poetry, non-fiction and art. It says it "continues to document lesser-known stories and histories [and] give a voice to those whose stories are otherwise marginalised, misrepresented or ignored, and point public debate in alternative directions".

Its formats are a quarterly print journal (which publishes fiction, poetry and essays) and an online magazine containing daily cultural commentary and occasional fiction and poetry. It also "holds events, discussions and debates, hosts a number of major literary competitions, and runs a residency for under-represented writers".

As of December 2019, the editors-in-chief are Evelyn Araluen and Jonathan Dunk, and it is published by a not-for-profit organisation. Its patron is Barry Jones.

== Competitions ==
- Judith Wright Poetry Prize for New and Emerging Poets (A$9,000), established in 2007
- Neilma Sidney Short Story Prize (A$5,000)
- Nakata Brophy Short Fiction and Poetry Prize for Young Indigenous Writers (A$5,000, publication in the print magazine, and a writing residency at Trinity College, University of Melbourne
- Victoria University Short Story Prize for New Writers (A$8,000)
- Fair Australia Prize (A$20,000)
- Overland Kuracca Prize for Australian Literature in honour of Kerry Reed-Gilbert (A$8,000)

== See also ==
- List of literary magazines
