= Stephen Murray-Smith =

Australian writer, editor and educator

- Born: 9 September 1922; Toorak, Victoria, Australia
- Died: 31 July 1988 (aged 65); Mount Eliza, Victoria, Australia
- Education: Geelong Grammar School
- Alma mater: University of Melbourne
- Occupations: Writer, editor, educator
- Spouse: Nita Bluthal
- Children: Joanna Murray-Smith

Stephen Murray-Smith AM (9 September 1922 – 31 July 1988) was an Australian writer, editor and educator.

== Early life and education ==
Murray-Smith's father ran a lucrative business shipping Australian horses to India for the armed forces. It enabled the family to live in Toorak, one of Melbourne's wealthiest suburbs, and to send Stephen to board at Geelong Grammar School from 1934. He described his home as "bookless", adding however that his mother was "a voracious reader all her life", getting her books from the circulating and public libraries.

The business, and the wealth, came "to a dead end in 1938, when the Indian army mechanised", but generosity from the school and from Murray-Smith's grandfather allowed him to remain at Geelong Grammar and complete his schooling in 1940. Murray-Smith later described Geelong Grammar as "a good but conservative middle-class school". In his position as secretary of the Public Affairs Society at the school he "invited Ralph Gibson of the Communist Party down to talk to us at school—under J.R. Darling it was that kind of school".

He spent a year at the University of Melbourne before enlisting in the army at the end of 1941. An avid reader from childhood, he recorded that in the three years before he enlisted he read 314 books, of which only one, Francis Ratcliffe's Flying Fox and Drifting Sand, was Australian.

== War and university ==
In July 1942, Murray-Smith embarked for New Guinea, where he served as a Bren gunner in a commando unit, the 2/5th Independent Company. His unit fought the Japanese at Wau. He contributed to the company's history after the war, of which John McLaren says, "His accounts of the travails of the track, the disastrous attack on a Japanese post, the hazards of allied air support, and the hilarious mismanagement of the retreat from Wau describe vividly what it was like to be an infantryman in trying conditions and at the end of a long chain of command." Murray-Smith later recalled: "The army consolidated the two important lessons I had already learned from boarding school: how to stay alive under difficulties, and the idiocy of authority."

After his discharge in early 1945 he resumed his studies at Melbourne, completing an honours Arts degree in history followed by a Dip.Ed., while taking a prominent part in student politics with his close friend Ian Turner.

== Europe and Overland ==
Murray-Smith joined the Communist Party of Australia in 1945. In early 1948, in a civil ceremony in Melbourne, he married Nita Bluthal, whose Jewish family had arrived in Australia from Poland in 1938. From 1948 to 1951 he and Nita lived in London and Prague, where he worked for the news agency Telepress.

They returned to Melbourne, and bought a house in the outer bayside suburb of Mount Eliza. Murray-Smith worked as the organising secretary of the Australian Peace Council from 1952 to 1958, and became a prominent member of the Melbourne Realist Writers' Group. He edited several editions of the Group's magazine, Realist Writer, from 1952 to 1954. In 1954, with financial assistance brokered by Judah Waten, he founded the quarterly literary magazine Overland. Overland, said Murray-Smith later, aimed "to talk of books and writing in an unselfconscious way with the assumption that there was no reason whatsoever why 'ordinary people' should not enjoy such writing and participate in it".

In 1958, when Ian Turner was expelled from the Communist Party, Murray-Smith resigned his membership. In order to prevent the Communists taking over Overland, he and Turner took the subscriber lists and hid them. Murray-Smith was determined that Overland should "avoid the dreadful humorlessness and dogmatism of the fully convinced". He continued to edit Overland until his death in 1988.

== Academic career ==
Murray-Smith worked for the Victorian Teachers’ Union from 1958 to 1961, then returned to the University of Melbourne, as research fellow, then as lecturer, then as reader in education by the time of his retirement in 1987. He completed a PhD in 1966. His thesis, "A History of Technical Education in Australia: With special reference to the period before 1914", is one of the university library's most-read theses. He edited the annual publication Melbourne Studies in Education from 1973 to 1982.

He called himself "a historian by profession" whose "special areas of historical research" were "technical education, on the one hand, the regional history of the Bass Strait area, and culture conflict therein, on the other". From the early 1960s until his death he and his family and friends camped every year on the otherwise uninhabited Erith Island in Bass Strait. He edited two books about the Bass Strait islands.

In 1981 he was appointed a Member of the Order of Australia.

He compiled two reference books in the 1980s, the 464-page Dictionary of Australian Quotations (1984) and Right Words: A Guide to English Usage in Australia (1987), which aimed "to apply an Australian understanding to words". He intended to produce further editions of Right Words, but this was one of several projects his death precluded.

== Values ==
Murray-Smith espoused what he called "radical nationalism", adding that Australia's radicals "should not seek to destroy the past, but to build on it". In 1981 he wrote:

I am a man whose emotional roots are in a simpler, less cosmopolitan Australia. I am grateful for my years in the Communist Party and for my involvement with the Jewish community, because these events have prevented me from being just another middle-aged, middle-class ex-public schoolboy, but deep down and far back my Australia is an Australia of the work ethic, of the dunny in the back yard ... of men going to football matches with hats on; and of the expansion of the Australian suburb, surely in many respects an original and beneficent Australian "invention".

== Death and legacy ==
Murray-Smith died of a heart attack on 31 July 1988 at his home in Mount Eliza. His family buried his ashes under a cairn at Erith Island.

He and Nita had a son and two daughters. One of their daughters, Joanna, is a playwright. Her play Fury (2013) explores "how the children of radical parents struggle to define themselves". She says of her parents, "For a good part of their life together ... they were completely absorbed in their ideology", but later they "were very cynical about people who stayed in the Communist Party. In fact, they were sceptical about any hardline ideologies."

The State Library of Victoria has held an annual Stephen Murray-Smith Memorial Lecture since 1992, with the aim of promoting "research and debate in the broad areas of Stephen's interest and influence". Lecturers have included Geoffrey Serle, Geoffrey Blainey, Malcolm Fraser, Anne Summers and Maxine McKew.

== Bibliography ==
=== Books ===
- There's No Iron Curtain: An Australian Journalist in Eastern Europe (1952)
- Henry Lawson (1962, 1975)
- Indirections: A Literary Autobiography (1981)
- Right Words: A Guide to English Usage in Australia (1987)
- The Tech: A Centenary History of the Royal Melbourne Institute of Technology (1987) (with A.J. Dare)
- Behind the Mask: Technical Education Yesterday and Today (1987)
- Sitting on Penguins: People and Politics in Australian Antarctica (1988) (an account of a visit to Antarctica in the summer of 1985-86)

As editor

- Rebel Songs (1947) (collection of protest songs; with Edgar Waters)
- The Tracks We Travel: Australian Short Stories (1953)
- Snatches and Lays: Songs Miss Lilywhite Should Never Have Taught Us (1962) (with Ian Turner, under the pseudonyms "Sebastian Hogbotel" and "Simon Ffuckes")
- An Overland Muster: Selections from Overland, 1954–1964 (1965)
- Bass Strait: Australia's Last Frontier (1969, 1975, 1987)
- For the Term of His Natural Life by Marcus Clarke (1970)
- Melbourne Studies in Education (annually from 1973 to 1982)
- Classic Australian Short Stories (1974)
- Mission to the Islands: The Missionary Voyages in Bass Strait of Canon Marcus Brownrigg, 1872–1885 (1979)
- Bass Strait Bibliography (1981) (with John Thompson)
- Room for Manoeuvre: Writings on History, Politics, Ideas and Play by Ian Turner (1982) (with Leonie Sandercock)
- The Dictionary of Australian Quotations (1984)

=== Murray-Smith's life and work ===
- Davidson, Jim (2022). Emperors in Lilliput : Clem Christesen of Meanjin and Stephen Murray-Smith of Overland. Carlton, Vic.: The Miegunyah Press.
