= Eddie Jaku =

German Holocaust survivor (1920–2021)

Eddie Jaku OAM
- Born: Abraham Jakubowicz; 14 April 1920; Leipzig, Saxony, Germany
- Died: 12 October 2021 (aged 101); Sydney, New South Wales, Australia
- Known for: Holocaust survivor; writer; peace activist

Edward Jaku OAM (born Abraham Salomon Jakubowicz; 14 April 1920 – 12 October 2021) was a German-born Australian Holocaust survivor and memorist. Jaku was a survivor of several German concentration camps during World War II and wrote of his wartime experiences after emigrating to Australia. His memoir, called The Happiest Man on Earth, was published when he was 100 years old. It became an immediate bestseller. Eddie had a sister Johanna (Henni) who also survived the Holocaust, and he changed his name to Edward (Eddie) as a tribute to his sister, who called him Eddie as an affectionate nickname.

== Biography ==
Jaku recounts that as a boy in Leipzig, Germany, he truly believed that he was part of "the most enlightened, the most cultured, the most sophisticated society in the whole world". His outlook changed following the rise of the Nazis, when he was initially expelled from his school for being Jewish. His father organised an alias for him with false ID papers, and he was sent to an engineering college far away from Leipzig for his own safety. One night in 1938, he came back to visit for his parents' wedding anniversary only to find the house deserted. It was the night of the antisemitic pogrom, Kristallnacht, and he was taken from his bed by stormtroopers and sent to a concentration camp in Buchenwald. Here a former classmate recognised him and recommended him to the camp's leaders as a skilled tool maker. He was released to go and work in a factory, but his father managed to intercept him and they escaped as refugees to Belgium.

Eddie was eventually recaptured several times and, along with his parents and sister, ended up in Auschwitz, where his parents were immediately sent to the gas chambers. His skill as an engineer made him valuable to the Nazi regime and his life was spared. Most of his extended family perished during the war, although his sister Henni survived.

After the war, he returned to Belgium, where he met and married another Jewish survivor, Flore Molho, with whom he had two sons, Michael and Andre. He vowed that he would now "walk from German soil and never come back to the land that had given me everything and taken everything away from me". In 1950 he emigrated to Australia with his wife and first child, Michael. His second child, Andre, was born in Australia.

Jaku served as a volunteer at the Sydney Jewish Museum from November 1992 until its closure due to COVID-19 in March 2020. He gave visitors a first-hand account of surviving the Holocaust. He has given invited lectures about his life experiences, including to members of the Australian Defence Force Academy in 2017, and in 2019 to a TEDxSydney.

An obituary was published by the BBC.

== Death ==
Jaku died in Sydney on 12 October 2021, aged 101.

His wife Flore died on 2 July 2022, also in Sydney, at age 98.

== Adaptations ==
An adaptation for the stage of The Happiest Man on Earth, by Mark St. Germain, premiered in 2023 at Barrington Stage Company, and was presented at the Contemporary American Theater Festival in 2024.

== Honours ==
Association	Award	Year	Results
Australian Government	Medal of the Order of Australia	2013	Honoured
New South Wales Government	Australian Senior of the Year	2020	Nominated
Australian Publishers Association	Australian Book Industry Award (for The Happiest Man on Earth)	2021	Honoured
