= Magabala Books =

Indigenous publishing house in Western Australia

- Founded: 1987
- Country of origin: Australia
- Headquarters location: Broome, Western Australia
- Publication types: Books
- Nonfiction topics: Indigenous Australian culture
- Official website: magabala.com

Magabala Books is an Indigenous Australian publishing house based in Broome, Western Australia, founded in 1987. Their stated objective is "restoring, preserving and maintaining Aboriginal and Torres Strait Islander cultures". The name Magabala is a Yawuru, Karrajari and Nyulnyul word for the bush banana. In 1990, they became an independent Aboriginal corporation.

Their published literature includes Aboriginal lore, children's books and oral history. Many prominent Australian Indigenous authors have been published with Magabala Books. including Anita Heiss, Ali Cobby Eckermann, Jimmy Pike, Alexis Wright, Bronwyn Bancroft, Jack Davis, Bill Neidjie, Stephen Hagan, Jack Davis, Jimmy Chi and Bruce Pascoe.

In May 2020, Magabala won the Small Publisher of the Year award at the Australian Book Industry Awards they also won the award in 2024 and then again in 2026. They also won the Children's Publisher of the Year Award in 2026 at the Australian Book Industry Awards. (Australian Book Industry Award Winners 2026 - ABIA) Magabala was nominated for the 2027 Astrid Lindgren Memorial Award as a promoter of reading.

The Magabala Fellowship, first launched in August 2020 and valued at A$10,000, is open to First Nations writers who have had at least one book published. Winners include Tristan Michael Savage in 2020, Sue McPherson and Charmaine Papertalk Green in 2021, Vivienne Cleven in 2022 and Brenton McKenna in 2023.

== See also ==
- Indigenous Australians § Literature
