= Horse (novel) =

2022 novel by Geraldine Brooks

- Author: Geraldine Brooks
- Audio read by: Michael Obiora, Katherine Littrell, Lisa Flanagan, Graham Halstead, James Fouhey
- Language: English
- Genre: Historical fiction
- Set in: 1850s Kentucky; 1950s New York; 2019 in D.C.
- Publisher: Viking (US); Hachette (AUS); Little, Brown (UK)
- Publication date: 14 June 2022 (US); 15 June 2022 (AUS); 16 June 2022 (UK)
- Publication place: United States; Australia; United Kingdom
- Pages: 401 pp.
- ISBN: 9780399562969 (hardcover 1st ed.)
- OCLC: 1264176221
- Dewey Decimal: 823.914
- LC Class: PR9619.3.B7153 H67 2022

Horse is a 2022 historical fiction novel by Australian author Geraldine Brooks.

Intertwining multiple timelines, the narrative examines the dynamics of thoroughbred racehorse and stud Lexington with the enslaved people who groomed him in the 1850s, and the legacy of slavery through the lens of unearthed art related to the breeder's lionized life. It was well-received by mainstream critics and won multiple literary prizes. Notably, it received an Anisfield-Wolf Book Award and Dayton Literary Peace Prize.

== Story ==
The novel takes place during three periods — 1850s pre-Civil War Kentucky, 1950s New York, and the discovery of a painting in 2019 by a Nigerian-born Georgetown University graduate student. Brooks presents a real and fictional imagining of how a groom named Jarret nurtured a connection with Lexington, a legendary horse of the 1850s that won seven of its eight races, won its owner over $50,000, was the fastest horse for twenty years, and produced hundreds of offspring that went on to win almost 1200 more races. The painting that is discovered is rooted in real artwork produced by contemporary artists such as itinerant Thomas J. Scott, whose oil painting, Portrait of Lexington (ca. 1857), is a preeminent depiction of racehorses in American heritage. Upon its death, Lexington's skeletal remains were rearticulated, displayed some time by Smithsonian Museum and for decades waited dormant in stored housing; its importance to racing and breeding were largely forgotten until resurfacing in the 1970s. The painting and the skeleton both heavily influenced Brooks's storytelling. The former eventually came into the hands of 1950s art dealer Martha Jackson whose wares and collection were oriented away from older portraits and toward abstract styles of mid-century expressionist pieces by people like Oldenburg, Hartigan, Gorky, and Diebenkorn. Portrait of Lexington came to the Smithsonian Museum at her bequest; it is still unknown why she owned it. The novel depicts this unlikely obtainance and later describes a scenario in which such a painting could be abandoned; only to be found by a black master's college student at a roadside sale while studying in his field of 19th century equine art.

== Characters ==
- Theo Northam – a Nigerian-American graduate student at D.C.'s Georgetown University researching 19th century art; he discovers a discarded painting of a male horse and decides to write a Smithsonian article about it. He is contacted by Jess to investigate a skeleton of a horse being stored at Smithsonian Museum and determines that both the painting and remains are of Lexington.
- Jess – a specialist in skulls and frames at the Smithsonian who reaches out to Theo regarding the skeleton of Lexington; the two start to date
- Harry Lewis – an 1850s freedman who trained Lexington
- Jarret Lewis – Harry's enslaved son who becomes Lexington's groom; the two are sold to a new owner and relocate first to a Mississippi plantation and then to New Orleans, where Lexington storms the racing world
- Lexington – the famous horse that at one point captured the world's attention but then was forgotten decades later; Jarret closely worked with Lexington to ensure he was well-cared for
- Thomas Scott - a painter who follows Lexington's career and who paints him several times, including the painting discovered by Theo
- Martha Jackson - an art dealer who donates one of Scott's paintings of Lexington to the Smithsonian
- Ten Broeck - a gambler from the North who purchases Lexington and Jarret and moves them from Kentucky to Louisiana

== Release ==
The novel was released in the US, UK, and Australian markets only days apart. An audiobook featuring a wide cast came out through Penguin Audio.

== Critical reception ==
The novel received starred reviews from Booklist, Kirkus Reviews, and Library Journal and a positive review from Publishers Weekly. Some noted the bond between Lexington and Jarret as a particularly poignant element in the story, while finding the narrative of Martha Jackson to be less impressing or compelling. Kirkus called it "strong storytelling in service of a stinging moral message," while the reviewer at Library Journal, Joshua Finnell, concluded that Brooks "penned a clever and richly detailed novel about how we commodify, commemorate, and quantify winning in the United States." Of importance, the novel goes about "detailing the profit reaped from the horse's abilities, likeness, and bones" which "parallels the historical erasure of Jarrett's contributions to the horse's prowess and success... Brooks probes our understanding of history to reveal the power structures that create both facts and fiction." The multiple narratives and complex character development captivated reviewers, but according to Kristine Dahl, "a late plot twist in the D.C. thread dampens the ending a bit." Kirkus disagreed, asserting that the "shocking denouement drives home Brooks' point that too much remains the same for Black people in America, a grim conclusion only slightly mitigated by a happier ending for Jarret."

In March 2025, the U.S. Department of Defense ordered that the novel be removed from the library of the U.S. Naval Academy in Annapolis, MD, listing it as one of 381 books that were banned for addressing topics related to diversity, equity and inclusion.

== Awards ==
Year	Award	Category	Result	Ref.
2022	ARA Historical Novel Prize	Adult	Shortlisted	
2023	Audie Awards	Literary Fiction & Classics	Finalist	
2023	Anisfield-Wolf Book Award	Fiction	Won	
2023	Australian Book Industry Awards	Literary Fiction	Won	
2023	Chautauqua Prize	—	Shortlisted	
2023	Dayton Literary Peace Prize	Fiction	Won	
2023	Heartland Booksellers Award	Fiction	Finalist	
2023	Indie Book Award	Fiction	Won	
2023	Massachusetts Book Award	Fiction	Honor Book	
