= Year of Wonders =

2001 novel by Geraldine Brooks

- First edition (UK)
- Author: Geraldine Brooks
- Language: English
- Genre: Historical Fiction
- Published: 2001 Viking Press UK
- Publisher: Viking Press (US); Fourth Estate (UK)
- Publication place: United Kingdom
- Media type: Print (Hardcover and Paperback)
- Pages: 400 pp
- ISBN: 0-670-91021-X
- OCLC: 45392971
- Dewey Decimal: 823/.914 21
- LC Class: PR9619.3.B7153 Y4 2001

Year of Wonders: A Novel of the Plague is a 2001 international bestselling historical fiction novel by Geraldine Brooks. It was chosen as both a New York Times and Washington Post Notable Book.

== Plot ==
The novel is written in the point of view of a housemaid named Anna Frith, on what she lives through when the plague hits her village. It is based on the history of the small Derbyshire village of Eyam that, when beset by the plague in 1666, quarantines itself in order to prevent the disease from spreading further. The plague that hit Eyam and other parts of Britain in 1665 and '66 was one of many recurrences that had taken place since the Black Death of the 14th century.

=== Plot summary ===
The novel opens in the spring of 1665 when a young widow Anna Frith, takes on a tailor, George Remington Viccars as a boarder. Shortly after the arrival of a box of fabrics from London, Mr. Viccars develops a high fever, and starts exhibiting symptoms of the bubonic plague. He begs her to burn all he brought with him to stop the spread of disease, but after his death, Mr. Viccars' clients come to claim their work and disregard the warning.

Over the next few weeks, Anna's neighbor (Mr. Viccars' employer), her two young sons, and a few other villagers fall ill with the plague and die. The spate of deaths is blamed on a widow, Mem Gowdie and her niece, Anys Gowdie, the village's herbalists and midwives, who are accused of being witches. Both Mem and Anys are murdered by villagers.

The Rector Mr. Michael Mompellion proposes that the villagers quarantine themselves to avoid spreading the "plague-seeds" beyond the village. Except the Bradfords, the local landed gentry, the whole village agrees.

Over the following months, Anna and the rector's wife Elinor attempt to learn the uses of the contents of the Gowdies' physick garden, and take up the roles of village midwives. Anna and Elinor develop a strong bond through their trials, the relationship becoming one of friends and equals instead of a servant and her mistress. They support each other through their struggles, and Elinor confesses as to why a high-born woman such as herself married a humble rector and devoted her life to helping the less fortunate. Meanwhile, as Elinor and Anna take care of the needs of the living, Mompellion struggles to keep up with the spiritual needs of the dying.

After the sexton dies of heart failure from digging so many graves, Anna persuades her father, Josiah Bont, to take up the work of gravedigging, but her plan fails when he takes to robbing the estates of the dead. Finally, the villagers hold a Barmote Court, where he is left to die or be saved by his wife, Aphra. But no one comes to save him.

Aphra, already superstitious, quickly descends into complete madness upon the death of three of her four children from plague and is discovered selling bogus charms and spells against the plague for extortionate prices. She does this by pretending to be the ghost of the deceased Anys Gowdie. The villagers punish her by casting her into a disused well that now serves as a manure pit, in which she nearly drowns. She is completely incoherent and in a catatonic state by the time she is brought out in the morning, and the rector postpones dealing with her crimes fully until the plague is over.

As no more are stricken with the Plague, the remaining villagers become secure in the fact that the Plague is truly gone from their village. Mompellion chooses to hold a service of Thanksgiving for their deliverance. However, the service has barely begun when a deranged Aphra, clutching the corpse of her youngest child, attacks the congregation, fatally slicing Elinor's neck before turning the knife on herself.

Mompellion succumbs wholly to grief and the total loss of his faith in God. Without their rector to guide them, the villagers also descend into ennui, too traumatized after so many months of death and suffering.

As Anna discovers a will to live in spite of the ordeal, she seeks to comfort Mompellion, and they are drawn together in equal desire and desperation for each other. After they make love, Mompellion confesses his own dark secret regarding his relationship with Elinor (He admits to never having sexual relations with his wife because of a sin she committed earlier in life), and Anna is repulsed. She flees, and finds the newly returned Elizabeth Bradford, who confesses that her mother is in labour with a bastard child and sure to die. Anna goes with Elizabeth and is able to safely deliver the baby. As the Colonel would not permit the bastard child to live, Anna offers to take the child and leave the village permanently.

In the epilogue, she briefly narrates the three years since she left Eyam. Her flight from the Bradford's wrath leads her to board the next ship leaving the port of Plymouth, taking her and the child to Oran. Upon her arrival, she seeks out a Muslim doctor, having found physick and midwifery to be her vocation. He agrees to take her in, due to his despair at sex segregation in Islam keeping women and their husbands from seeking his aid during medical emergencies and labour. To satisfy the customs of the Al-Andalus Arabs, he takes her as one of his wives in name only so that she may continue her study and work with him freely. The book closes with her taking her two daughters by the hand before going into the city – the Bradford child, who is now named A'isha, for the sustenance she gave Anna during their sea voyage to Oran, and her birth daughter, conceived with Michael Mompellion, whom she has named Elinor.

== Characters ==
- Anna Frith, the protagonist of the novel, is employed as a young housemaid at the Rector's house. Widowed with two young sons at age 18, she witnesses first-hand the trauma of the plague, as her house-guest, children and neighbours all sicken and die.
- Elinor Mompellion, the Rector's wife, who bonds with Anna as they do what they can to help the other villagers.
- Michael Mompellion, the Rector, who is the new priest in the village, has to get used to the village and faces the challenge of being a leader for the village and visiting people's bedsides as they die.
- Mr. Viccars, a tailor who stays at Anna's house, and is the first to get sick with the plague. Before he dies, he asks Anna to burn his clothes that he has made for the townspeople.
- Anys Gowdie, a medicine specialist, who attracts much attention in the village (particularly from the menfolk). After the first spate of deaths, she and her aunt Mem Gowdie are accused of being witches.
- The Bradfords, a wealthy family who flee whilst the rest of the village, commit to quarantine themselves in order to prevent spreading the "Plague-seeds".

== Reception ==
Shaunagh O'Conner describes the novel as "quirky, stranger-than-fiction tales from history", and praising its use of "fascinating details of life in the 1600s." Laura D. Shumar compared Year of Wonders to "Albert Camus's La Peste (1947; The Plague, 1948)." In an interview with the author, Noah Adams called it "heartbreaking." Shumar also stated that "Anna was not a person, but a perfect character." Laurence Mazzeno of Magill Book Reviews praises it as "Exceptionally well researched and deftly crafted".

In 2020, the book was named the 100th most banned and/or challenged book in the United States from 2010 to 2019, according to the American Library Association.

== Major Themes ==
The Australian named the themes of "witchcraft, madness, and repressed sexuality."

The book also has the themes of strength, woman's power, religion, and trust.
