= Geraldine Brooks (writer) =

Australian-American journalist and novelist (born 1955)

Geraldine Brooks AO
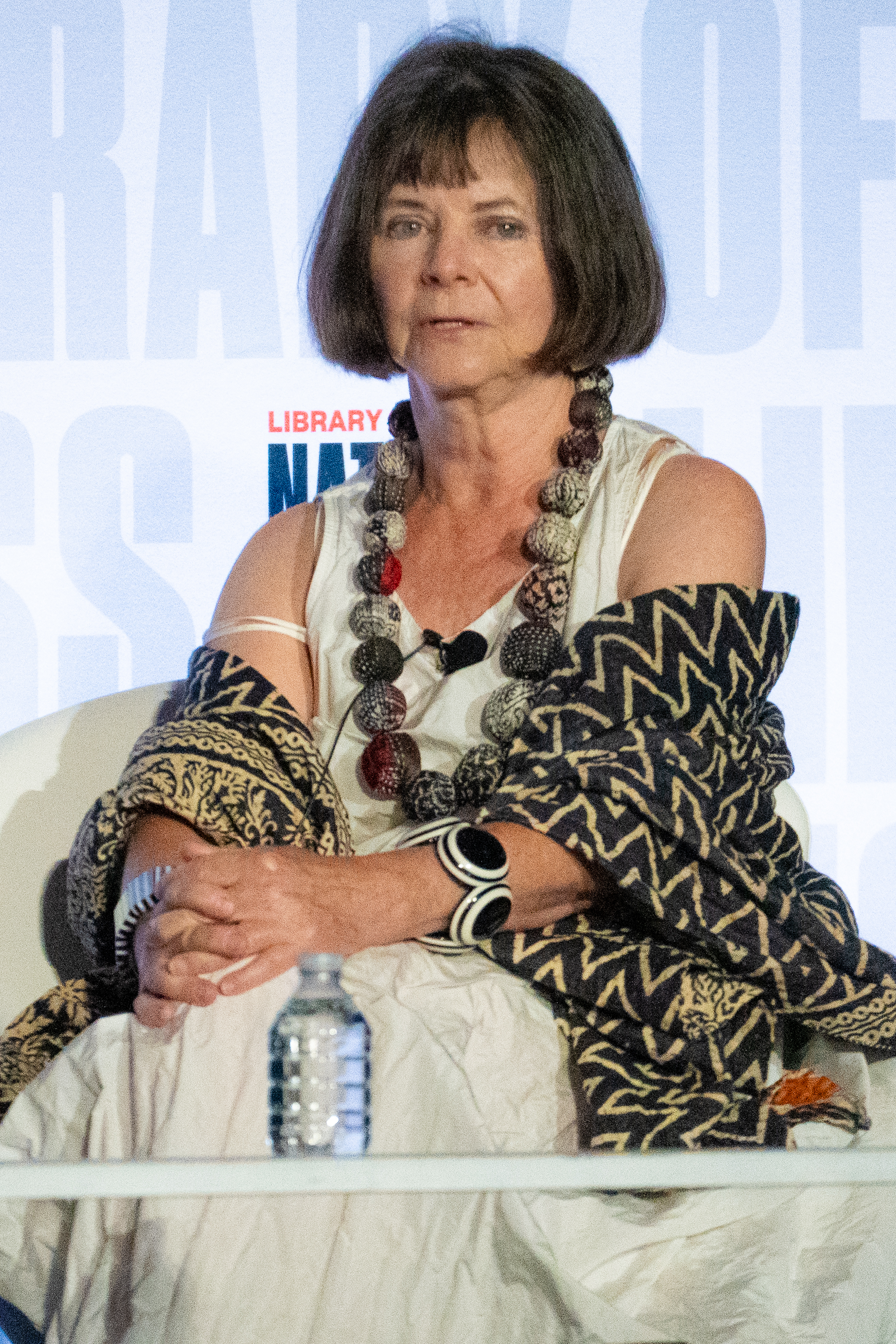
- Brooks at the National Book Festival 2025
- Born: 14 September 1955 (age 71); Sydney, New South Wales, Australia
- Citizenship: Australian and American
- Education: University of Sydney (BA); Columbia University (MA)
- Occupations: Journalist, writer
- Spouse: Tony Horwitz (m. 1984; died 2019)
- Children: 2, incl. Nathaniel Horwitz
- Writing career
- Genre: Historical fiction

Geraldine Brooks AO (born 14 September 1955) is an Australian-American journalist and novelist. She won the Pulitzer Prize for Fiction for her 2005 novel March.

== Early life and education ==
Geraldine Brooks was born on 14 September 1955 in Sydney. Brooks grew up in the Sydney suburb of Ashfield. Her father, Lawrie Brooks, was an American big-band singer turned newspaper sub-editor. Her mother Gloria, from Boorowa, was a public relations officer with radio station 2GB in Sydney.

Brooks attended Bethlehem College, a Catholic secondary school for girls, and then the University of Sydney. Following graduation, she was a reporter for The Sydney Morning Herald and, after winning a Greg Shackleton Memorial Scholarship, moved to the United States, completing a master's degree at New York City's Columbia University Graduate School of Journalism in 1983.

In 1984, in the Southern France village of Tourrettes-sur-Loup, she married American journalist Tony Horwitz and converted to Judaism.

== Career ==
As a foreign correspondent for The Wall Street Journal, Brooks covered crises in Africa, the Balkans, and the Middle East. The stories from the Persian Gulf that she and Tony Horwitz reported in 1990 earned the Overseas Press Club's Hal Boyle Award for Best Newspaper or Wire Service Reporting from Abroad.

Brooks's first book, Nine Parts of Desire (1994), based on her experiences among Muslim women in the Middle East, was an international bestseller. It was translated into 17 languages.

Her book Foreign Correspondence (1997), which won the Nita Kibble Literary Award for women's writing, is a memoir and travel adventure about a childhood enriched by pen pals from around the world, and her adult quest to find them.

Her first novel, Year of Wonders (2001), became an international bestseller. Set in 1666, the story depicts a young woman's battle to save her fellow villagers as well as her own soul when the bubonic plague suddenly strikes her small Derbyshire village of Eyam.

Her next novel, March (2005), was inspired by Louisa May Alcott's Little Women, creating a chronicle of wartime service for the "absent father" of the March girls. Some aspects of this chronicle were informed by the life and philosophical writings of Alcott's father, Amos Bronson Alcott, whom she profiled under the title "Orpheus at the Plough" in the 10 January 2005 issue of The New Yorker, a month before March was published. The parallel novel received a mixed reaction from critics. It was selected in December 2005 by The Washington Post as one of the five best fiction works published that year and in April 2006 it won the Pulitzer Prize for Fiction.

From 2005 to 2006, she was a fellow at the Harvard Radcliffe Institute.

In her novel People of the Book (2008), Brooks explored a fictionalized history of the Sarajevo Haggadah. This novel was inspired by her reporting (for The New Yorker) of human interest stories emerging in the aftermath of the 1991–95 breakup of Yugoslavia. The novel won the Australian Book of the Year award and the Literary Fiction Book of the Year award in 2008.

Her 2011 novel Caleb's Crossing was inspired by the life of Caleb Cheeshahteaumuck, a Wampanoag convert to Christianity who was the first Native American to graduate from Harvard College in the seventeenth century.

Brooks, at the invitation of the Australian Broadcasting Corporation, delivered the 2011 series of the Boyer Lectures. These were then published as The Idea of Home.

The Secret Chord (2015) is a historical novel based on the life of the biblical King David in the Second Iron Age.

In 2016, Brooks visited Israel as part of a project by Breaking the Silence to write an article for a book on the Israeli occupation, to mark the 50th anniversary of the Six-Day War. The book was edited by Michael Chabon and Ayelet Waldman, and was published under the title Kingdom of Olives and Ash: Writers Confront the Occupation in June 2017.

In 2022, Brooks published Horse, a historical novel based upon the racing horse Lexington. It was a New York Times Best Seller. It won the 2023 Anisfield-Wolf Book Award for Fiction.

Brooks was awarded the Library of Congress Prize for American Fiction in 2025. In 2025, Brooks collaborated with Kamala Harris on her political memoir 107 Days.

Her book Memorial Days was a finalist for the 2025 National Book Critics Circle Award for Autobiography.

== Recognition ==
- 1996: Overseas Press Club Award for best coverage of the Gulf War.
- 2006: Pulitzer Prize for Fiction for March
- 2008: Australian Publishers Association's Literary Fiction Book of the Year for People of the Book
- 2009: Helmerich Award
- 2010: Dayton Literary Peace Prize Lifetime Achievement Award
- 2016: Officer of the Order of Australia in the Australia Day Honours
- 2023: Indie Book Awards Fiction prize for Horse
- 2023: Anisfield-Wolf Book Award for Fiction
- 2025: Library of Congress Prize for American Fiction
- 2026: Biography Book of the Year, Australian Book Industry Awards for Memorial Days

== Works ==
=== Novels ===
Year	Title	Publisher	ISBN	OCLC
2001	Year of Wonders	Fourth Estate	ISBN 9781841154589	OCLC 883638361
2005	March	Harper Perennial	ISBN 9780143115007	OCLC 1055419299
2008	People of the Book	Viking Penguin	ISBN 9781460750858	OCLC 910657795
2011	Caleb's Crossing	HarperCollins Publishers Australia	ISBN 9780143121077	OCLC 861687308
2015	The Secret Chord	Hachette Australia	ISBN 9780733632174	OCLC 946487809
2022	Horse	Viking Press	ISBN 9780399562969	OCLC 1329421472

=== Nonfiction ===
- Brooks, Geraldine (1994). Nine Parts of Desire: The Hidden World of Islamic Women. Anchor Books. ISBN 9780385475761.
- Foreign Correspondence: A Pen Pal's Journey from Down Under to All Over. Anchor Books/Doubleday. 1997. ISBN 9780385482691.
- Boyer Lectures 2011: The Idea of Home (or "At Home in the World"). ABC Books. 2011. ISBN 9780733330254.
- Memorial Days: A Memoir (hardcover 1st ed.). New York: Viking. 2025. ISBN 9780593653982.

== Personal life ==
While retaining her Australian citizenship, Brooks became a United States citizen in 2002. She has two sons with her husband Tony Horwitz, who died in 2019. Her son Nathaniel Horwitz co-founded Hunterbrook and Mayday Health.
