= Enver =

Enver is both a masculine given name and a surname. In Turkish, Albanian, Bosnian and Crimean Tatar, it is the transliteration of the Arabic name Anwar, which means "luminous". Notable people with the name include:

== Given name ==
- Enver Ablaev (born 1979), Uzbek-born Ukrainian freestyle skier
- Enver Adrović (born 1969), Montenegrin retired footballer
- Enver Ahmed (1909–1992), Indian cartoonist
- Enver Alikhanov (1917–1992), Azerbaijani Soviet minister
- Enver Alivodić (born 1984), Serbian footballer
- Enver Aliyev (1927–2017), Crimean Tatar cotton farmer and Soviet labor hero
- Enver Altaylı (born 1944), Turkish writer, academic and former secret agent
- Enver Balkan (1902–1966), Turkish Olympic fencer
- Enver Baig (1948–2023), Pakistani politician and member of the Senate of Pakistan
- Enver Brandt (born 1991), South African rugby union player
- Enver Bukić (1937–2017), Slovenian chess grandmaster
- Enver Cenk Şahin (born 1994), Turkish footballer
- Enver Čolaković (1913–1976), Bosnian writer and poet
- Enver Duran (born 1945), Turkish professor and medical doctor
- Enver Erdogan, Australian politician
- Enver Faja (1934–2011), Albanian architect and diplomat
- Enver Galim (1915–1988), Tatar writer and journalist
- Enver Gjokaj (born 1980), Albanian-American film and television actor
- Enver Hadri (1941–1990), Kosovar Albanian human-rights activist
- Enver Hadžiabdić (born 1945), Bosnian footballer and manager
- Enver Hadžihasanović (1950–2024), Yugoslavian and Bosnian military general and convicted war criminal
- Enver Halilović, Bosnian ambassador
- Enver Hasani, Kosovar Albanian academic
- Enver Hoxha (1908–1985), Albanian politician and leader of the People's Socialist Republic of Albania from 1946 until his death in 1985
- Enver Hoxhaj (born 1969), Kosovar politician
- Enver Ibërshimi (born 1939), Albanian football player
- Enver Idrizi (born 1966), Croat-Albanian karateka
- Enver Imamović (born 1940), Bosnian archaeologist and historian
- Enver İzmaylov (born 1955), Crimean Tatar jazz musician
- Enver Jääger (born 1982), Estonian retired footballer
- Enver Ziya Karal (1906–1992), Turkish academic
- Enver Kazaz (born 1962), Bosnian writer and intellectual
- Enver Koso (born 1966), Bosnian handball player
- Enver Lisin (born 1986), Russian ice hockey player
- Enver Lugušić (born 1961), Bosnian goalkeeper
- Enver Maloku (1954–1999), Kosovar Albanian journalist
- Enver Mamedov (1923–2023), Soviet diplomat
- Enver Marić (born 1948), Bosnian footballer and coach
- Enver Mujezinović, former Yugoslav intelligence agent
- Enver Ören (1939–2013), Turkish businessman
- Enver Pasha (1881–1922), Ottoman statesman, general and politician
- Enver Petrovci (1954–2025), Kosovar actor
- Enver Redžić (1915–2009), Bosnian historian and cultural observer
- Enver Sajjad (1935–2019), Pakistani playwright and fiction writer
- Enver Šehović (1967–1993), Bosnian army commander
- Enver Sekiraqa (born 1972), Kosovar fugitive
- Enver Shehu (1934–2009), Albanian footballer and manager
- Enver Sherfedinov (1936–2017), Crimean Tatar musician
- Enver Soobzokov (born 1978), Jordanian basketball player
- Enver Surty (born 1953), South African politician
- Enver Yetiker (1875–1955), Turkish educator
- Enver Yıldırım (born 1995), Turkish fencer
- Enver Yulgushov (1938–2022), Russian footballer and coach
- Enver Gortash, fictional character from the video game Baldur's Gate 3

== Middle name ==
- Ali Enver Adakan (born 1977), Turkish retired dinghy sailor
- Hasan Enver Pasha (1857–1929), Ottoman general

== Surname ==
- Ali Enver (1921–1971), Turkish military pilot
- Aslı Enver (born 1984), Turkish actress
- Mahpeyker Enver (1917–2000), Ottoman princess
- Naciye Enver (1896–1957), Ottoman princess
- Türkan Enver (1919–1989), Ottoman princess

== See also ==
- 24641 Enver, an asteroid
- Pioneers of Enver, pioneer movement functioning in Albania during the communist era
- Enver's alphabet, Turkish alphabet created by Enver Pasha
- Enver Creek Secondary School, a public high school in Canada
- Ənvər Məmmədxanlı, Azerbaijan, a village in Azerbaijan
- Enver Pasha's Rebellion, 1921–1922 anti-Bolshevik campaign in Turkestan
- Murder of Enver Şimşek, 2000 murder in Germany
- Anwar (disambiguation), the Arabic form of the name
- ENVER, a game studio based in New York City
