= Galim =

Galim could refer to:

- Galim, Cameroon, a commune in West Region, Cameroon
- Galim-Tignère, a commune in Adamawa Region, Cameroon

- Nizaa language, a language native to the commune

- Enver Galim, Tatar writer
- Peto Galim, Malaysian politician and engineer

== See also ==
- Bat Galim, a neighborhood of Haifa, Israel
- Kfar Galim, a youth village in Haifa District, Israel
- Nir Galim, a village in Central District, Israel
- Golem (disambiguation)
