= Derviš Korkut =

Bosnian scholar (1888-1969)

- Born: 5 May 1888; Travnik, Condominium of Bosnia and Herzegovina, Austro-Hungarian Empire
- Died: 28 August 1969 (aged 81); Sarajevo, SR Bosnia and Herzegovina, SFR Yugoslavia
- Occupations: Librarian and scholar
- Known for: Saving the Sarajevo Haggadah and Mira Papo, a Jewish girl during the Holocaust
- Spouse: Servet Ljuž
- Children: Munih, Abida, Lamija
- Parent(s): Ahmed Munib Korkut and Šahida Biščević

Derviš Korkut (5 May 1888 – 28 August 1969) was a Bosnian scholar and humanist. A librarian and curator of the National Museum of Bosnia and Herzegovina, he is famous for saving the Sarajevo Haggadah from the Nazis and Ustašas during the Holocaust in the Independent State of Croatia. Korkut also saved a Jewish girl, Mira Papo by bringing her into his family and hiding her identity.

After the World War II, when he refused to join the Communists he was sentenced to prison for several years. He was released, but his civil rights were never restored. After his release he continued his job as curator of the Museum of the City of Sarajevo until his death in 1969. Together with his wife, Servet Ljuž, he was proclaimed Righteous among the Nations by Yad Vashem in 1994.

His brother was Besim Korkut.

== Biography ==
Korkut was born on 5 May 1888 in Travnik to father Ahmed Munib Korkut and mother Šahida (née Biščević). He had four brothers and five sisters. One of his brothers, Besim, who was an Arabic professor, translated the Quran into Bosnian. Early in his life, Korkut wanted to become a doctor, but after urging from his parents to continue learning, he went to study in Istanbul and at the Sorbonne. In addition to his native Bosnian, Korkut spoke Turkish, Arabic, French and German.

He was mobilized into the Austro-Hungarian army in July 1917 as a military imam at the rank of II Class captain. He worked as a chief in the Muslim section of the Ministry of Religions in Belgrade from 1921 to 1923, when he was forced to resign due to pressure from members of the People's Radical Party.

From September 1923 to October 1925 he was Secretary of the Yugoslav Muslim People's Organization, gathered around Ibrahim Maglajlić. From 1927 until his appointment for the mufti of Travnik in September 1929, he worked as curator of the National Museum. The Law on the Islamic Religious Community later abolished the muftis of Travnik and Bihać. Until 1937 he worked as a curator of the National Museum of Montenegro in Cetinje and at the Riyaset of the Islamic Religious Community. In 1940 he married Servet Ljuž, an Albanian from Kosovska Mitrovica. With her, Korkut had three children.

On 6 April 1941, Yugoslavia was invaded by the Axis powers of Nazi Germany and Fascist Italy. After a short campaign that lasted just 12 days, the Yugoslav Army surrendered on 17 April. The Nazis established the Independent State of Croatia, a puppet state that controlled all of modern-day Croatia, Bosnia and Herzegovina and parts of Serbia, led by Ante Pavelić. His Ustaše militias became notorious for their violent policies against the Serb, Jewish and Romani populations in the region.

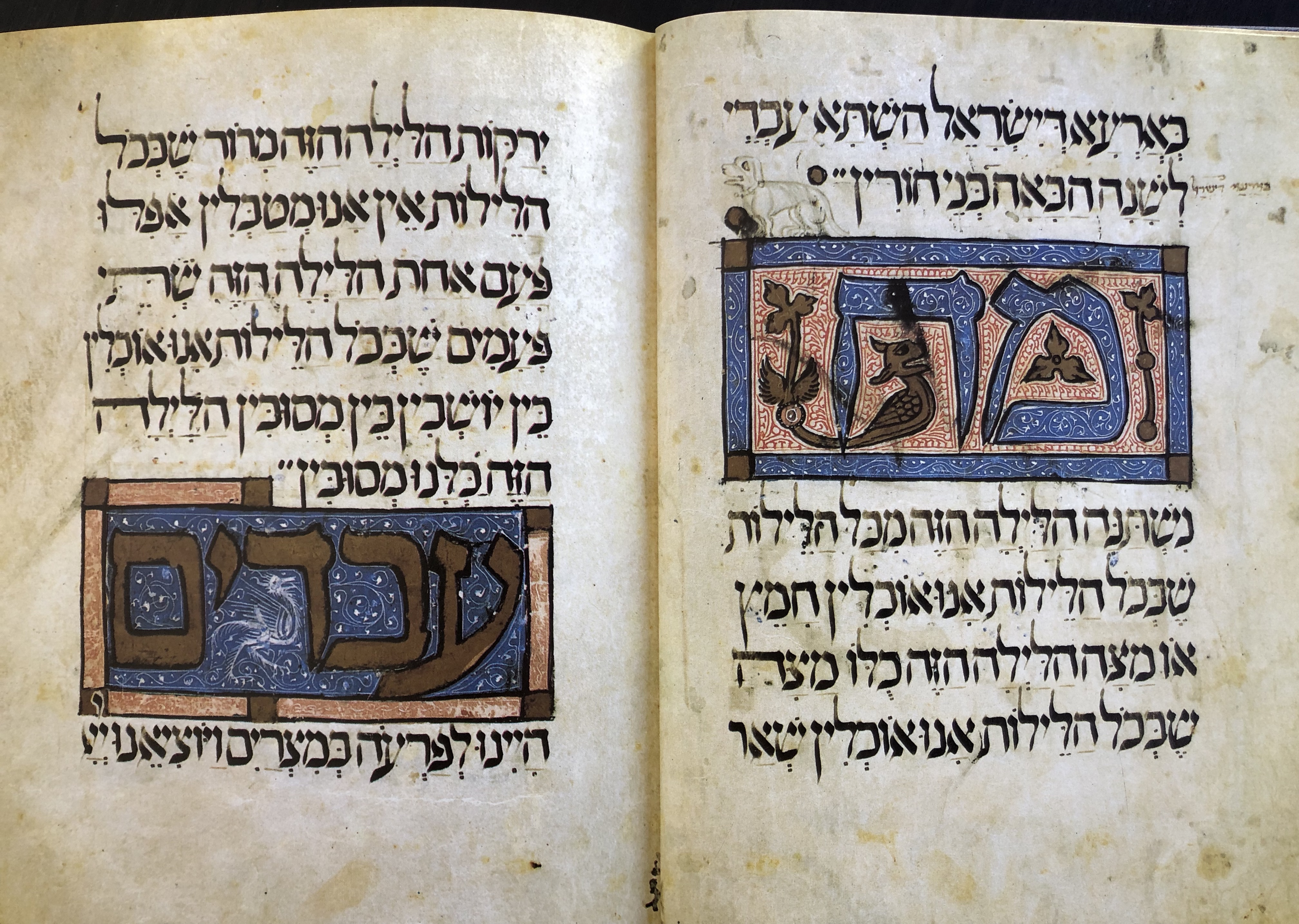
The Sarajevo Haggadah

In early 1942, the German commander Johann Fortner arrived in Sarajevo to take the Sarajevo Haggadah. Korkut grabbed the Haggadah from the vault, after which he tucked in his coat just minutes before the general arrived. During a meeting in the museum office, Fortner demanded the employees to hand over the manuscript. The employees convinced him that a German officer already had the manuscript, but refused to disclose who possessed it. Later that afternoon, he drove out of the city to a remote village where he gave his friend who was imam of a local mosque the book. The Haggadah was hidden among several Qurans and other sacred Islamic texts where it was saved from destruction. It was returned intact to the museum at the end of the war.

In April 1942, Korkut came across Mira Papo, a nineteen-year-old Jewish girl. Mira and her family were previously arrested by the Ustaše and was taken to a women's camp. Her father Salomon, who worked as a custodian in the Finance Ministry was taken to the Jasenovac concentration camp, where he perished. Mira escaped and joined the Yugoslav Partisans shortly afterwards. However, many of her comrades were killed and Papo returned to Sarajevo where she came across a friend of her father's who sympathized with her situation. Korkut heard about her and snuck her out to his home. She was given a veil and the Korkuts said she was a girl named Amira who was a house servant.

Derviš and Besim also contributed to the signing of a resolution condemning atrocities committed against Serbs and Jews living in the Independent State of Croatia. Mira stayed with them for months until August 1942, when a family member living in the Italian occupied zone gave her a train ticket to travel toward the Adriatic where she hid out for the rest of the war. The Italians interned Jews escaping from the Nazis and Ustaše, but they were treated better and allowed sanctuary. In 1994, Derviš and Servet were awarded the Righteous Among the Nations for their actions during the Holocaust.

== Legacy ==
In his scholarly work Derviš Korkut was most interested in and wrote about the minorities in Bosnia and Herzegovina: Jews and Albanians. He has written in: "La Tribune des Peuples", "L'Abstinence", "Gajret", "Pravda", "Iršad", "Večernja pošta", "Glasnik Saveza trezvene mladosti", "Glasnik Zemaljskog muzeja", "Narodna starina", Cetinje's "Zapisi", "Novi behar" and others. In his works he mainly dealt with the period of Ottoman rule. He was also involved in philology, especially collecting turcisms in the Bosnian language. From 1933 to 1936 he was the editor of "Glasnik IVZ" (Gazette of the Islamic Religious Community).

In 2023, descendents of Korkut donated the house he loved (which fell into disrepair) and 20 dulums of land in the town of Donji Vakuf to rebuild and transform it into a museum

== Bibliography ==
- Bejtić, Alija (1974). Derviš M. Korkut kao kulturni i javni radnik. Sarajevo: Oslobođenje.
- Hadžijahić, Muhamed (1972). Osvrti – In memoriam (Anali Gazi Husrev-begove biblioteke). Sarajevo: Gazi Husrev-begova biblioteka.
- Nametak, Alija (2004). Sarajevski nekrologij. Sarajevo: Civitas.
