= Sarajevo Haggadah =

Illuminated Jewish Passover service book

- National Museum of Bosnia and Herzegovina, Sarajevo
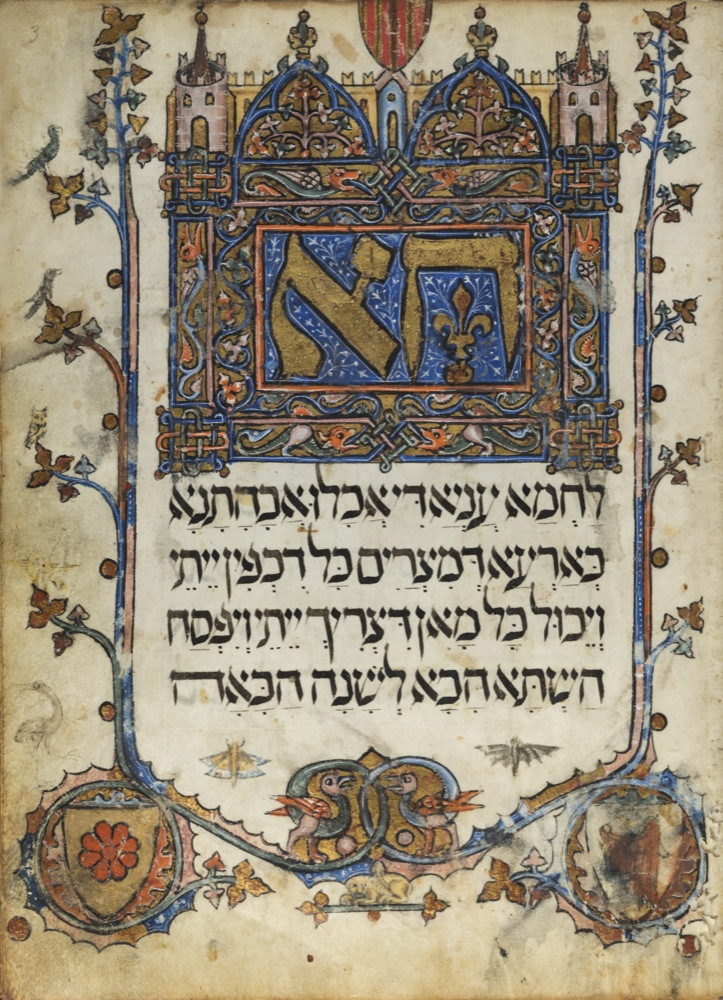
- One of the beginning pages of the Sarajevo Haggadah, containing part of Ha Lachma Anya
- Type: Spanish–Provençal Sephardic Passover Haggadah
- Date: around 1350
- Place of origin: Catalonia, perhaps Barcelona
- Language(s): Hebrew, Aramaic
- Material: Vellum, gold and pigments
- Condition: good
- Other

KONS of Bosnia and Herzegovina
- Official name: Sarajevo Haggadah, property of Bosnia and Herzegovina, the movable property
- Type: movable property
- Criteria: A, C ii.v., E ii.iii.iv.v., G i.ii.iii.iv.vi., H i., I iii.iv.
- Designated: 17 January 2003 (?th session, No. 05- 6- 80/ 03- 2)
- Reference no.: 779
- State of conservation: Preserved
- Status: National Monuments of Bosnia and Herzegovina
- Operator: Archeological Department of the National Museum of Bosnia and Herzegovina)

The Sarajevo Haggadah is an illuminated manuscript that contains the illustrated traditional text of the Passover Haggadah which accompanies the Passover Seder. It belongs to a group of Spanish–Provençal Sephardic Haggadahs, originating "somewhere in northern Spain", most likely the city of Barcelona, around 1350, and is one of the oldest of its kind in the world.

The Haggadah is owned by the state and kept in the National Museum of Bosnia and Herzegovina in Sarajevo. Its monetary value is undetermined, but a museum in Spain required that it be insured for $7 million before it could be transported to an exhibition there in 1992.

The Sarajevo Haggadah was inscribed as a National Monument of Bosnia and Herzegovina by KONS, on 17 January 2003, as movable cultural property. The Sarajevo Haggadah was submitted by Bosnia and Herzegovina for inclusion in UNESCO's Memory of the World international register and was included in 2017.

== Description ==
The Sarajevo Haggadah is handwritten on the recto and verso in Hebrew, using square script typical for medieval Spain, on bleached calfskin vellum and illuminated with some gold. It opens with 34 pages of illustrations of key scenes in the Bible from creation through the death of Moses. Its pages are stained with wine, evidence that it was used at many Passover Seders. It was probably created as a wedding gift for a marriage between the two families whose coats of arms appear at the bottom of the opening page. The Golden Haggadah in the British Library is another medieval book from Catalonia, a few decades older.

== History ==
The Sarajevo Haggadah has survived many close calls with destruction. Historians believe that it was taken out of the Iberian Peninsula by Jews who were expelled by the Alhambra Decree in 1492. Notes in the margins of the Haggadah indicate that it surfaced in Italy in the 16th century. It was sold to the National Museum in Sarajevo in 1894 by a man named Joseph Kohen.

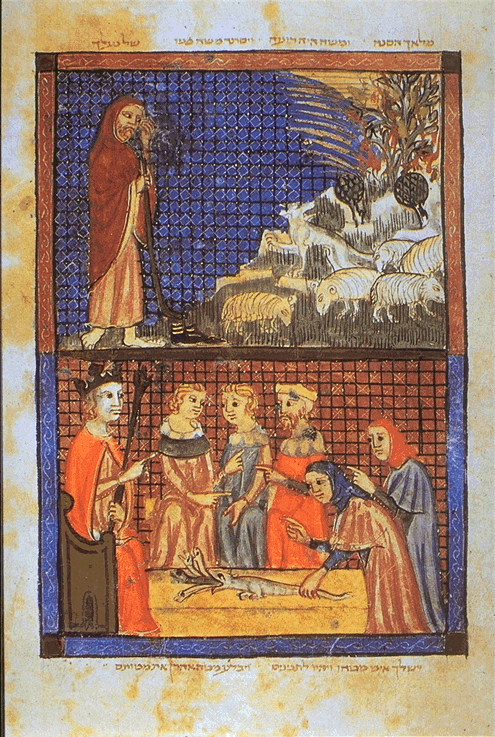
Page from the Sarajevo Haggadah, written in fourteenth-century Catalonia. Top: Moses and the Burning Bush. Bottom: Aaron's staff swallows the other magicians' wands (Exodus 7:10–1)

During World War II, the manuscript was hidden from the Nazis and Ustashe by the Museum's chief librarian, Derviš Korkut, who risked his life to smuggle the Haggadah out of Sarajevo. Korkut gave it to a Muslim cleric in a village on a mountain of Bjelasnica, where it was hidden in a mosque. In 1957, a facsimile of the Haggadah was published by Sándor Scheiber, director of the Rabbinical Seminary in Budapest. In 1992 during the Bosnian War, the Haggadah manuscript survived a museum break-in and a flooding of the museum's basements, where the safe with the Haggadah was located. University of Sarajevo archeologist Professor Enver Imamović, who assumed directorship of the Museum at the time, asked police to enter the premises with him to search for and rescue the book. It was discovered, by one account, in the safe, and the other on the floor, during the police investigation by a local Inspector, Fahrudin Čebo. Many other items thieves believed were not valuable were also left scattered around. From the museum it was taken into an underground Central Bank vault, where it was kept in secrecy and survived the Siege of Sarajevo by Serb forces. To quell rumors that the government had sold the Haggadah in order to buy weapons, the president of Bosnia presented the manuscript at a community Seder in 1995.

== Restoration and conservation ==
In 2001, concerned with the possible continuing deterioration of the Sarajevo Haggadah which was stored in a city bank vault under less than ideal conditions, Dr. Jakob Finci, the head of Sarajevo’s Jewish Community, appealed to Jacques Paul Klein, the Special Representative of the Secretary General and Coordinator of United Nations Operations in Bosnia and Herzegovina, for his assistance in ensuring the preservation and restoration of this priceless historical treasure.

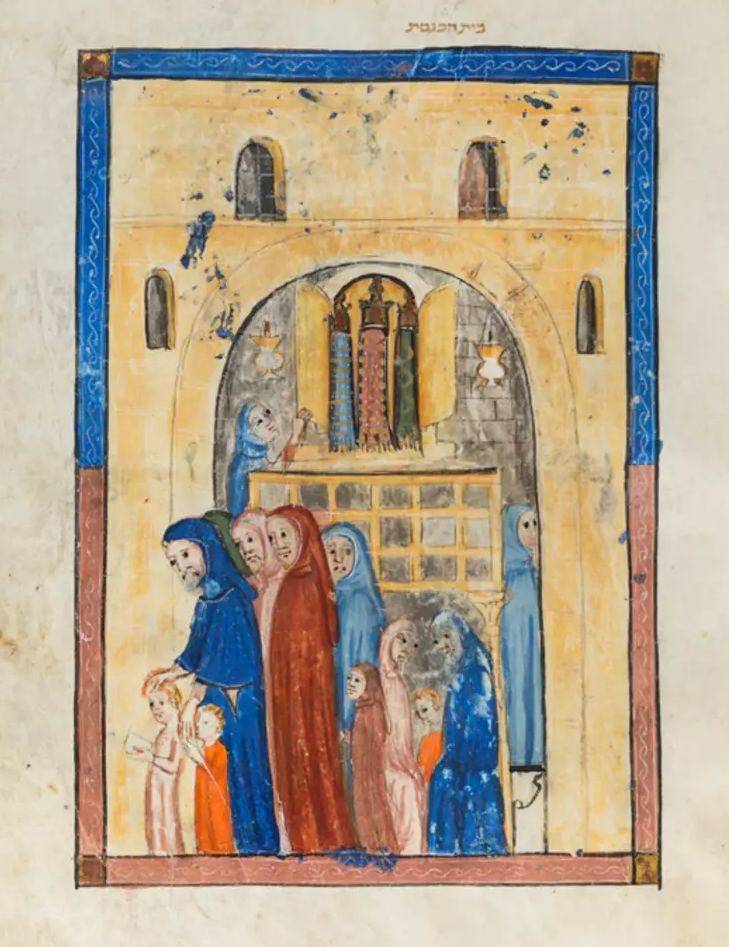
Synagogue scene

Klein quickly agreed and developed a plan to secure the required funding, identify an internationally recognized expert to undertake the restoration and make space available in the United Nations Headquarters building where the restoration efforts could begin.

When the project became public knowledge, Klein was surprised at reticence of some local Bosnian officials to support the project. Only after informing President Izetbegovic of their obstructionism and letting him know that the International Community would take a dim view of their lack of cooperation did President Izetbegovic clear the way for the restoration project to begin.

Klein initiated an international campaign to raise the required funding. Contributions came from individuals, institutions, embassies and governments from around the world. With funding in hand and with Dr. Pataki, from Stuttgart’s Akademie Der Bildenden Künste, ready to begin the restoration project a climate-controlled room was refurbished in Sarajevo’s National Museum to house the Haggadah as the centerpiece, surrounded by documents of the Catholic, Orthodox and Muslim faiths. Additionally, as a beau geste to the City of Sarajevo, a second climate-controlled vault was funded to house the national archives of Bosnia and Herzegovina.

=== New vault room ===
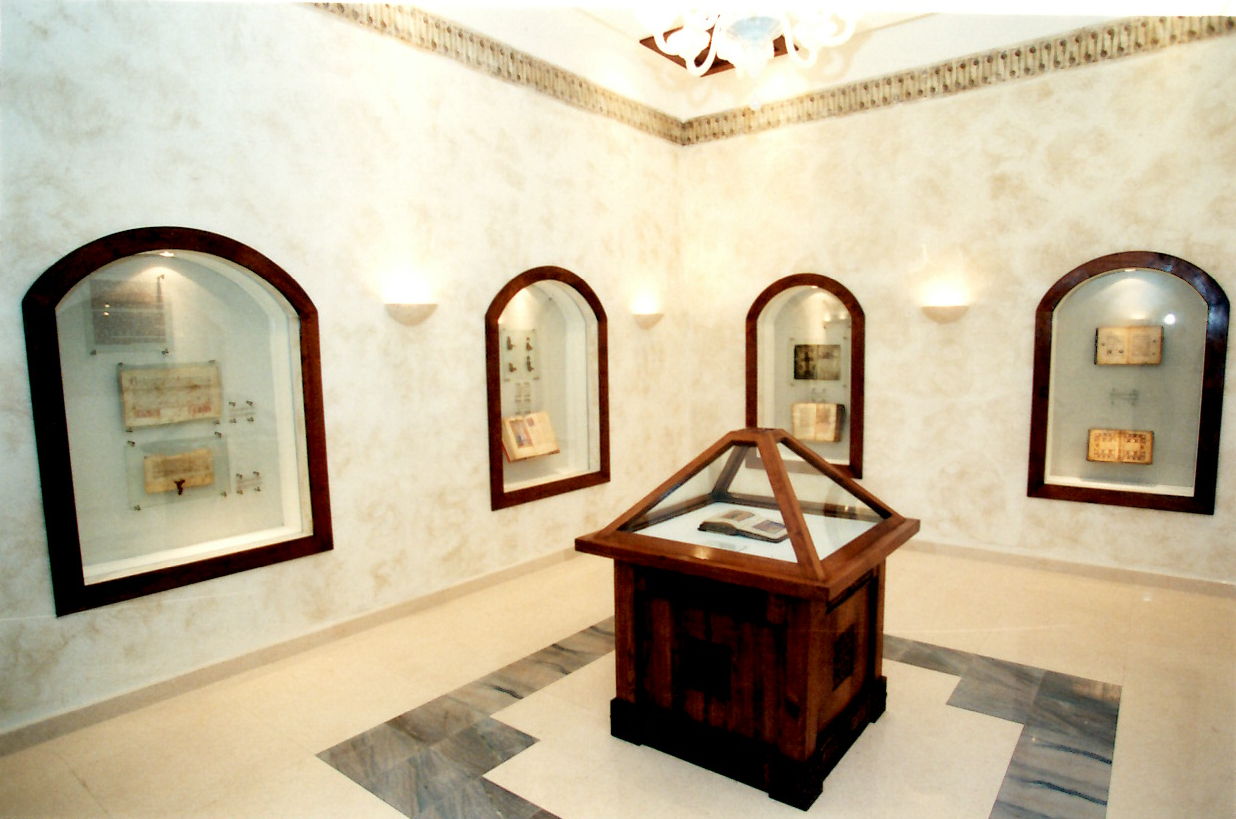
Sarajevo Haggadah vault room, containing the Haggadah as well as Catholic, Orthodox, and Muslim manuscripts

On 2 December 2002, the vault room was dedicated by the Special Representative of the Secretary General in the presence of senior Bosnian government officials, the diplomatic community and international media as well as the public. The Sarajevo Haggadah and other sacred and historical religious documents had, at last, found a worthy home.

In October 2012, the Haggadah's future exhibition was left in limbo following a drought in funding for the National Museum of Bosnia and Herzegovina, which shuttered its doors after going bankrupt and not paying its employees for almost a year. In 2013 the New York Metropolitan Museum of Art attempted to arrange for a loan of the Haggadah, but due to internal political battles within Bosnia and Herzegovina, the loan was eventually refused by Bosnia's National Monuments Preservation Commission.

Following the museum's reopening in 2015, the vault underwent renovation paid by France before reopening in 2018. In 2025, the museum announced that it would donate proceeds from ticket sales to view the manuscript to Palestinian's affected by the Gaza war. Several Jewish organizations, including the Anti-Defamation League, criticized the decision.

== Reproductions ==
In 1985, a reproduction was printed in Ljubljana, with 5,000 copies made. The National Museum subsequently authorized the publication of a limited number of reproductions of the Haggadah, each of which has become a collector's item. In May 2006, the Sarajevo publishing house Rabic Ltd., announced the forthcoming publication of 613 copies of the Haggadah on handmade parchment that attempts to recreate the original appearance of the 14th century original, alluding to the 613 Mitzvot.

A copy of the Sarajevo Haggadah was given to former Prime Minister of the United Kingdom Tony Blair by the Grand Mufti of Bosnia and Herzegovina Mustafa Cerić during the awards ceremony for the Tony Blair Faith Foundation's Faith Shorts competition in December 2011. The Grand Mufti presented it as a symbol of interfaith cooperation and respect, while recounting the protection of the Jewish book by Muslims on two occasions in history. Another copy was given by the Grand Mufti Mustafa Cerić to a representative of the Chief Rabbinate of Israel during the interreligious meeting "Living Together is the Future" organised in Sarajevo by the Community of Sant'Egidio.

== Cultural references ==
There is a brief mention of the manuscript in the motion picture Welcome to Sarajevo. The novel People of the Book, by Geraldine Brooks (2008), crafts a fictionalised history of the Haggadah from its origins in Spain to the museum in Sarajevo. The Winter, 2002, issue of the literary journal Brick published Ramona Koval's account of the disputes surrounding the proposed UNESCO-funded display of the original codex in the context of the post-Dayton Agreement UN-supervised 1995 peace settlement.

The history of Derviš Korkut, who saved the book from the Nazis, was told in an article by Geraldine Brooks in The New Yorker magazine. The article also sets out the story of the young Jewish girl, Mira Papo, whom Korkut and his wife hid from the Nazis as they were acting to save the Haggadah. In a twist of fate, as an elderly woman in Israel, Mira Papo secured the safety of Korkut's daughter during the Bosnian war in the 1990s.

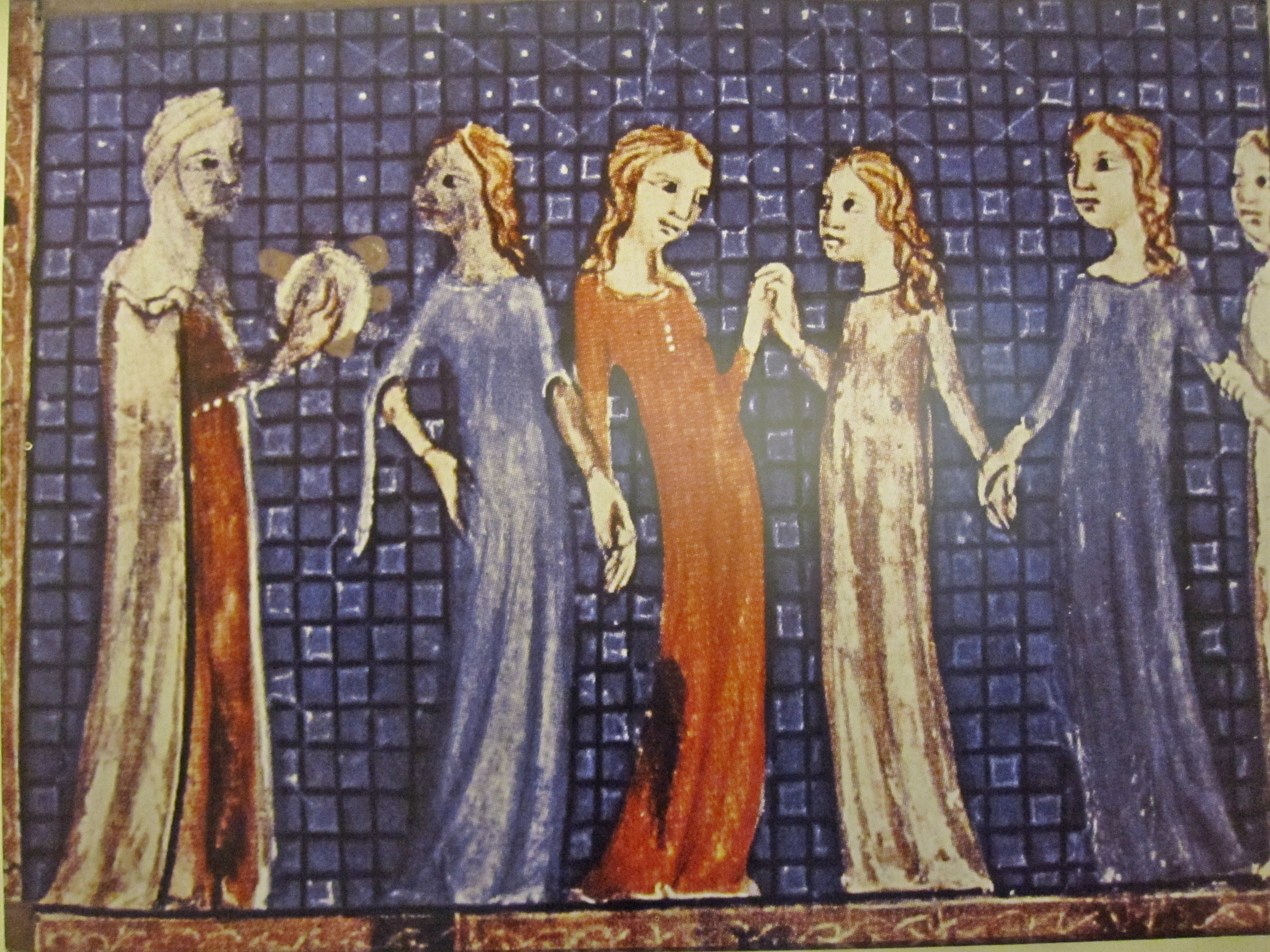
"And Miriam took a timbrel in her hand", Book of Exodus 15:20

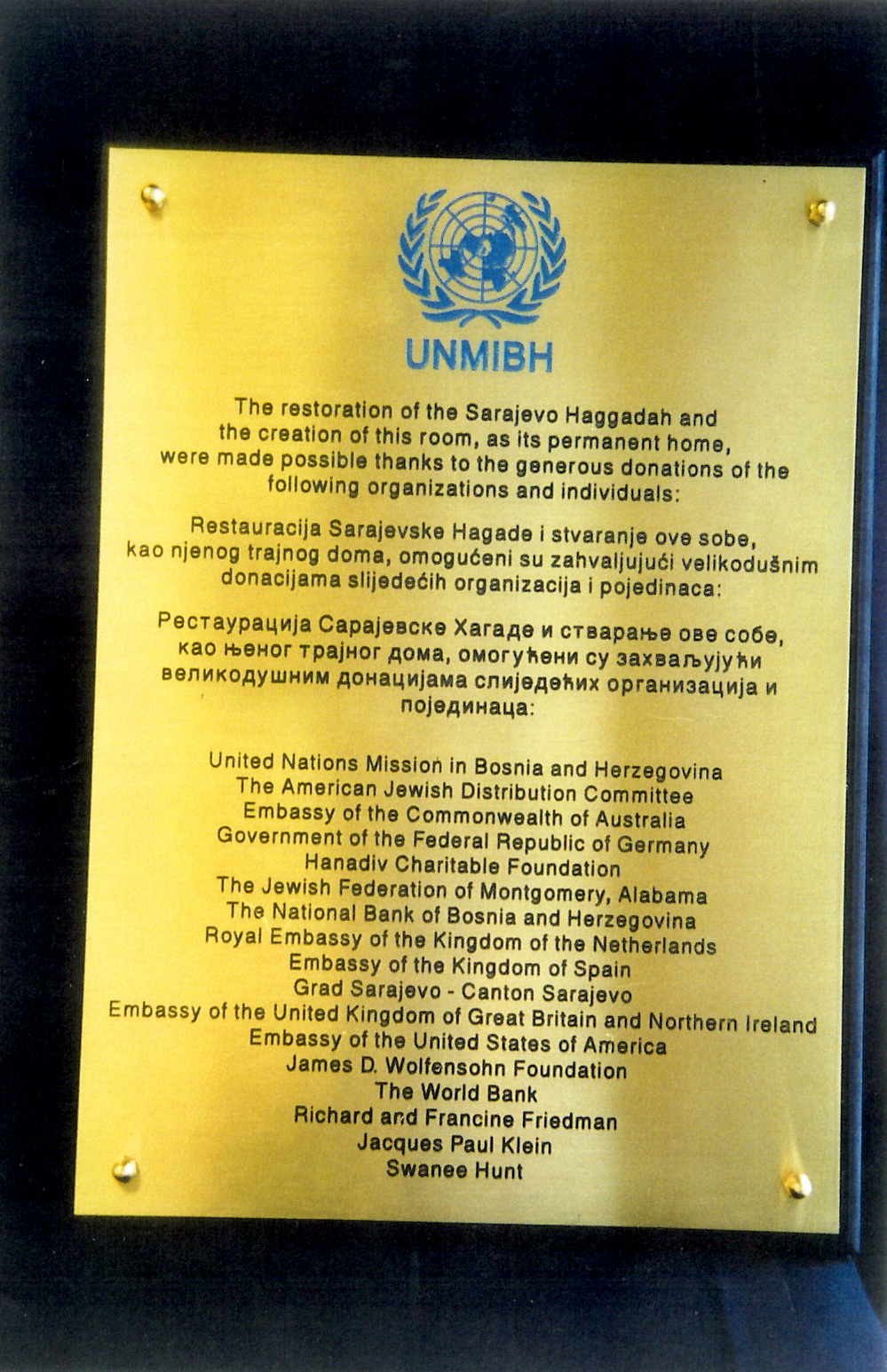
Contributors to the restoration of the Sarajevo Haggadah

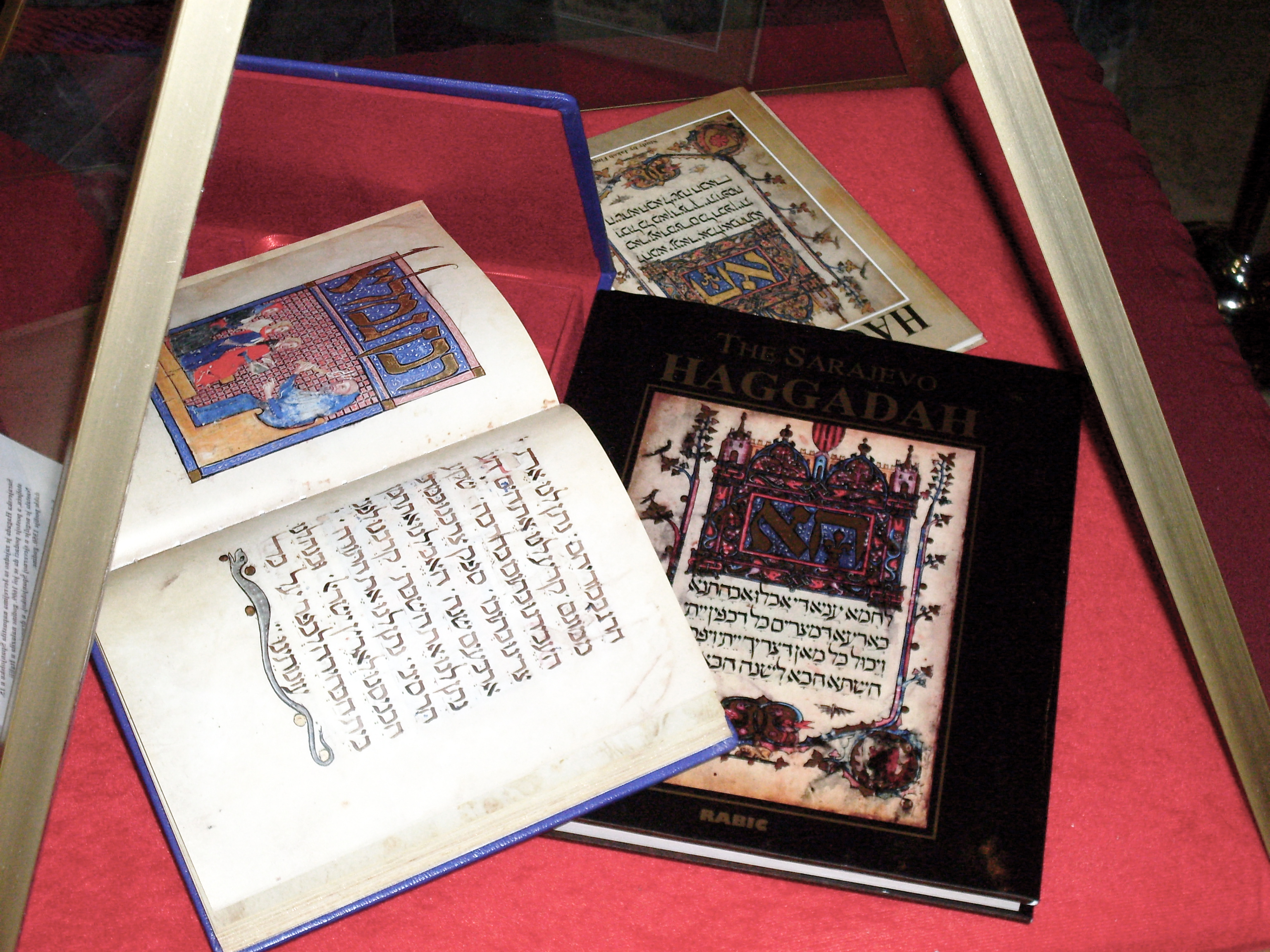
Copies of the Sarajevo Haggadah in the parliament building of Bosnia and Herzegovina
