= Golem (disambiguation) =

A golem is an artificial animated being in medieval and Jewish folklore.

Golem or The Golem may also refer to:

== Film and television ==
- The Golem (1915 film), a film directed by Paul Wegener and Henrik Galeen
- The Golem: How He Came into the World, a 1920 film also starring Paul Wegener
- Le Golem or The Golem: The Legend of Prague, a 1936 film directed by Julien Duvivier
- It!, a 1967 British horror film directed by Herbert J. Leder
- Golem (1979 film), a Polish film directed by Piotr Szulkin
- Golem (2000 film), a 2000 film directed by Louis Nero
- The Golem (2018 film), a 2018 Jewish horror film directed by the Paz Brothers
- The Limehouse Golem (2016 film)
- Golem Creations, a production company
- "The Golem" (Ray Donovan), a 2013 television episode
- "The Golem" (Sleepy Hollow), a 2013 television episode

== Gaming ==
- Golem (Dungeons & Dragons), a man-made creature in Dungeons & Dragons
- Golem (Pokémon), a Pokémon species
- Golem (2018 video game), a 2018 video game by Longbow Games
- Golem (2019 video game), a 2019 video game by Highwire Games
- Golem, a troop featured in the mobile games Clash of Clans and Clash Royale; variations include an Ice Golem and an Elixir Golem

== Literature ==
- Golem (Marvel Comics), a Marvel Comics heroic monster
- The Golem (Meyrink novel), a 1914 novel by Gustav Meyrink
- The Golem (Singer novel), a 1969 novel by Isaac Bashevis Singer
- Golem (Wisniewski book), a 1996 picture book by David Wisniewski
- The Golem (Leivick), a 1921 dramatic poem by H. Leivick
- El Golem, a 1964 poem by Jorge Luis Borges
- "Golem" (short story), a comical short story by Lee Yeongdo
- The Golem: What You Should Know About Science, a book on the sociology of science by Harry Collins and Trevor Pinch

== Music ==
- Golem (band), a German death metal band
- Golem (klezmer band), a New York-based band
- The Golem (album), a soundtrack by Black Francis for the 1920 film The Golem: How He Came into the World
- Golem, track 8 from the 1991 album Angel Rat by Voivod
- Golem, track 6 from the 2014 album Massive Cauldron of Chaos by 1349

== Opera ==
- Golem (Bretan opera) Golem lásadása, a 1923 opera by Nicolae Bretan
- Golem (Casken opera), a 1991 opera by John Casken
- Der Golem (opera), a 1926 opera by Eugen d'Albert based on Holitscher's play
- The Golem, a 1962 opera by Abraham Ellstein
- The Golem, a 1980 grand opera by Larry Sitsky

== People ==
- Golem of Kruja, fl. 1250s, an Albanian nobleman

== Places ==
- In Albania:
  - Golem, Fier, a subdivision of the municipality of Lushnjë, Fier County
  - Golem, Tirana, a village in the municipality of Kavajë, Tirana County
- Golem Grad, an island in Lake Prespa in Macedonia

== Technology ==
- Golem (ILP), an inductive logic programming system
- Golem (computer), a series of computers built at the Weizmann Institute in Rehovot, Israel
- Golaem, a software developer

== See also ==
- Golem XIV, a 1981 novel by Stanisław Lem
- Gollum, a character in J. R. R. Tolkien's Middle-earth
- Gollum (disambiguation)
- Category:Fictional golems
