= Sekirača =

Sekirača Секирача (Serbian)
- Village
- Location within Serbia
- Coordinates: 42°54′N 21°27′E
- Country: Serbia
- District: Toplica District
- Municipality: Kuršumlija

Population (2002)
  - Total: 29
- Time zone: UTC+1 (CET)
  - Summer (DST): UTC+2 (CEST)

Sekirača is a village in the municipality of Kuršumlija, Serbia. According to the 2002 census, the village has a population of 29 people.

== History ==
Sekirača had 49 houses inhabited by Albanians before the Expulsion of the Albanians took place in 1877–1878. All Albanians left the Kuršumlija region by force of the Serbian army and fled to modern-day Kosovo, which was back then the Vilayet of Kosovo of the Ottoman Empire. These Albanians became known as Muhaxhirs and were demographically Albanians of the Gheg dialect and Muslims.

Some families from Sekirača kept their surname as the village they were from which is the reason why this surname appears in Kosovo.

== Notable people ==
- Enver Sekiraqa, businessman, criminal and Kosovo's previous most wanted man
