= Gollum (disambiguation) =

Gollum is a character in English writer J. R. R. Tolkien's fictional universe of Middle-earth.

Gollum may also refer to:

== Taxa ==
- Gollum (shark), a genus of ground shark
- Smeagol (gastropod), a genus of gastropod

See also List of things named after J. R. R. Tolkien and his works#Hobbits for more organisms with "Gollum" in their names.

== Other ==
- Gollum (software), the wiki system used by the GitHub web hosting system
- Gollum browser, a web application designed for using Wikipedia
- Gollum or Golin language, a language of Papua New Guinea
- The Lord of the Rings: Gollum, a video game
- The NATO reporting name for the Smerch/Shtil-1 naval SAM in the Buk missile family

== See also ==
- Golem (disambiguation)
- Collum (disambiguation)
