= Ali Aliev (physicist) =

American Crimean Tatar physicist

Ali Enver Aliev (Crimean Tatar: Ali Enver oğlu Aliyev; Russian: Али Энверович Алиев; born September 10, 1955) is a Crimean Tatar American physicist, research professor at the NanoTech Institute, and adjunct professor at Physics Department, The School of Natural Sciences and Mathematics, University of Texas at Dallas. In 2011 he was recognized an “Inventor of the year” by Time magazine His fields of current research interest are nanoscience and nanotechnologies, electrochromism and acoustics. He holds a number of invention patents from the United States Patent and Trademark Office (USPTO).

== Biography ==
Ali Aliev was born in Tashkent to a Crimean Tatar family; they had been forcibly exiled to the Uzbek SSR as special-settlers (official second-class citizens) along with most of the Crimean Tatar population in the Surgun of May 1944. Despite numerous hardships, in 1973 his father Enver became a Hero of Socialist Labour for cotton production, but subsequently faced reprimand from party leaders for endorsing a letter requesting right of return to Crimea and was only able to return to his homeland in 1990.

In 1977 he graduated with honors from the Radio Engineering faculty of Kharkiv National University of Radio Electronics. 1984 he got his PhD in Molecular and Thermal Physics at the Uzbek Academy of Sciences. Thesis Title: "Study of the Fast Ionic Transport in rare-earth Fluorides". 1992 — Doctor of Science degree in physics (Solid State Physics), Heat Physics Department of Uzbek Academy of Sciences. Thesis Title: "Relaxation Phenomena in Superionic Conductors". From 1988 till 2004 he worked at Heat Physics Department of Uzbek Academy of Sciences. In 1992—2004 he was the Head of the Physical Acoustic Research Laboratory of the named department. Since 2004 Aliev has been research professor at Alan MacDiarmid Nanotech Institute at University of Texas at Dallas.

Ali Aliev is an author of more than 100 scientific articles and 13 patents in the field of nanoscience and nanotechnology, among them, for instance, a patent for a heat visibility cloak.

Aliev is married to Elvira Umerova; they have two daughters.

== Awards ==
- Inventor of the year 2011 by "Time" magazine.
- Nano 50 Award in the United States, 2006: Processes for Carbon Nanotube Yarn and Sheet Fabrication, University of Texas at Dallas.
- 2006 NanoVic Prize for Innovation in Nanotechnology from Nanotechnology Victoria, Australia.
- Science award in Physics, 2004: State award of Republic of Uzbekistan "For Development of Nanomaterials and Nanotechnology”, given by the Minister of Science and Technology Committee of the Republic of Uzbekistan.
- Grand Prize for the achievements in Science, 2001: Recipient of a medal “Glory” for the achievements in Science given by Uzbekistan government.
- Cited in Marquis book “Who’s Who in Science and Engineering” 8th (2005–2006) Edition, NJ.
- Fellowship award by Korean Government Program and Science&Technology Policy Institute (STEPI), 1999–2000.
- Prize (Medal and Diploma) for “Development and Design of Ultrasonic Drilling Machine” awarded on 26th International Salon in Geneva, 1998.
- Young Scientist Award of International Union of Radio Science (URSI), General Assembly, Kyoto, Japan, 1993.
