= Murder of Triumf Riza =

2007 murder of Kosovar police officer

- Location: Pristina, UN administered Kosovo
- Date: 30 August 2007; 19 years ago
- Attack type: murder
- Weapon: Gun
- Victim: Triumf Riza
- Perpetrators: Arben Breisha; Enver Sekiraqa (incitment)

On 30 August 2007, Kosovar police officer Triumf Riza was murdered in Pristina. Riza's death triggered massive protests against organized crime.

Arben Berisha, an associate of mobster Enver Sekiraqa was convicted and sentenced to 35 years in prison in 2010. Sekiraqa meanwhile, who had been on the run for several years, surrendered to EULEX in 2012 and was eventually convicted by a Kosovo Court for inciting his murder and ultimately sentenced in May 2024 to 25 years, following appeals. He has since become a fugitive with the police unable to locate him.

== Background ==
At 20 years old, Triumf Riza (July 5 1979 – 30 August 2007) was among the early recruits of Kosovo's newly established police service, formed at the end of the Kosovo War and establishment of the United Nations Interim Administration Mission in Kosovo (UNMIK) in 1999. He was an accomplished athlete who competed in fitness and bodybuilding competitions, and later served in a special police unit. The unit was responsible for protecting political leaders and visiting dignitaries.

Corruption within the Kosovo Police Force became apparent even in its earliest stages, much due to the low salaries paid to the officers. Organized crime was also identified as a problem. During this time, Enver Sekiraqa became a prominent figure in Kosovo's criminal underworld and was investigated or arrested in connection with criminal activity.

Riza became involved in a series of confrontations with figures associated with Enver Sekiraqa. According to Triumfi's father, the conflict between the two began sometime in 2000, when Triumfi, accompanied by several UNMIK police officers, stopped a car in which Enver Sekiraqa was reportedly traveling. Sekiraqa allegedly emerged from the vehicle holding a hand grenade and threatened the officers. Between 2003 and 2006 Riza reported seven cases involving threats, attacks, intimidation, injuries and attempted murders, allegedly involving Sekiraqa or members of his group. The conflict escalated into an armed confrontation at Pristina's Swiss Casino in December 2005, in which several people were injured.

== Murder ==
The feud between Riza and Enver Sekiraqa escalated when Riza became involved romantically with locally well known singer Adelina Ismajli, previously involved with Sekiraqa. On August 30, 2007, Riza was ambushed on a street in broad daylight and shot to death in Pristina. He was the third Kosovo Police Officer killed in 2007.

== Aftermath ==
=== Prosecution ===
Within days, Kosovo Police had detained several people in connection with the killing. On September 1, Arben Berisha confessed to murdering Riza and surrendered to police. Berisha was sentenced with 35 years in prison in 2010.

Following Riza's murder, Sekiraqa fled and remained a fugitive for several years before surrendering to EULEX in 2012. Enver Sekiraqa was later prosecuted and convicted for inciting Riza's murder, with the courts finding that he had instigated Berisha to carry out the killing. He was sentenced to 37 years in prison in 2016. Upon appeal, his sentence was reduced to 30 years on 16 September 2019, and to 25 years on 3 May 2024 following a second appeal. Two weeks later, police were unable to locate Sekiraqa when they arrived to apprehend him. Due to a court decision after this trial, Sekiraqa was allowed to be free while waiting for the court decision to be finalized, with no detention measures put in place; and by the date of 17 May 2024, when the Court of Appeal had confirmed Sekiraqa's 25 year sentence, he was not found at his residence.

=== Legacy ===
Riza's death sparked outrage from the public, resulting in several thousand protestors, including Kosovo politicians, marching in down town Pristina and demanding reforms.

Riza is seen as a symbol against organized crime and has been described as a "hero" within the young police force, amidst its ongoing battle with internal corruption.
