= Richard Bernas =

British-based conductor

Richard Bernas (born April 21, 1950, in New York City, New York, United States) is a British-based conductor.

He studied music at York University (UK) and conducting with Witold Rowicki in Warsaw (1976).

After a period working as a pianist and percussionist – when he collaborated with such composers as Karlheinz Stockhausen, John Cage, Earle Brown and Morton Feldman and played in the live electronic improvising group Gentle Fire (1968 - 1975) - he founded the new music ensemble Music Projects/London (1978) . The ensemble toured in Europe, recorded for the BBC and other radio stations, appeared at major UK Festivals and recorded for NMC, Virgin, Factory and Decca. His recording of John Casken's opera Golem with Music Projects/London won the Gramophone Award for Contemporary Music (1991).

With the ensemble and other orchestras Bernas has worked with many leading composers. World premieres he has conducted have included Gavin Bryars' opera "Medea" (1984 Lyon and Paris Operas), of which he is also the dedicatee, Nicholas Maw's Odyssey (1989 Royal Festival Hall), James Dillon’s Oceanos (1996 BBC Proms) John Casken's Golem (1989 Almeida Opera) as well as newly commissioned ballets for The Royal Ballet at Covent Garden, where he has been a guest conductor since 1988.

Other theatre work includes Mozart's Idomeneo for the Theatre du Capitole, Toulouse (2000), the Ravel Operas for Opera Zuid Holland (2003), Britten's Death in Venice (Scottish Opera 1988) and The Prince of the Pagodas at Covent Garden and at the MET. He conducted the BBC television production of Mark Anthony Turnage's Greek, which won the Royal Philharmonic Society Award in 1992.

Between 2001 and 2016 Richard Bernas was also a Music Consultant at Tate Modern, London. The work he developed there is gallery and site specific rather than based on conventional concert hall situations. It has included performing Feldman's Rothko Chapel and Tallis' Lamentations in Tate's Rothko Room, commissioning Rebecca Saunders' Chroma (2003) for the large Turbine Hall, performing music during such exhibitions as Arte povera, Brâncuși, Open Systems and Kandinsky, mounting a large scale John Cage Musicircus to celebrate the re-hang of the Abstract collection (2006) and collaborations with BBC Radio 3.

Bernas made his Royal Philharmonic Orchestra debut in March 2009.

== Footnotes ==
- 1. Interview Composition Today November 2006
- 2. Information Please list of 1991 Gramophone Awards
- 3. Peters Edition biography of James Dillon
- 4. May 4, 2005 New York Times, Anthony Tommasini review of Covent Garden
- 5. Web archive Theatre du Capitole Toulouse
- 6. July 21, 1997 New York Times review of Royal Ballet at the Metropolitan Opera
- 7. July 11, 2006 The Independent review The Sound of Colour Almeida Festival
- 8. Web archive Tate Modern
