= Golem (Casken opera) =

1989 opera by John Casken

- Chamber opera by John Casken
- Librettist: The composer, with Pierre Audi
- Language: English
- Premiere: 18 June 1989; Almeida Theatre, London

"Golem" is a chamber opera created by John Casken, an English composer, in collaboration with Pierre Audi, a French-Lebanese theatre director. Casken wrote both the music and the libretto for the opera. It premiered at the Almeida Theatre in London on 18 June 1989. The opera was published by Schott and received subsequent performances and a recording.

== History ==
Golem is a chamber opera by English composer John Casken. It was commissioned by the Almeida Festival. The libretto is by the composer and was created in collaboration with French-Lebanese theatre director Pierre Audi. The opera was premiered at the Almeida Theatre in London on 18 June 1989. It was published by Schott Music.

Since its premiere, Golem had six further productions by Northern Stage/Northern Sinfonia in Newcastle-upon-Tyne in the UK (1991), at the Opernhaus Dortmund (1994) and in Berlin (2001) in Germany, in Omaha (1990) and Aspen (2000) in the US, and a touring production of Rennes, Quimper, Nantes and Angers in France (2006).

== Roles and scoring ==
The roles and their voice types are as follows:

- Maharal, a Rabbi; leader of his community - baritone
- Golem, a large figure made of clay - bass baritone
- Miriam, the Maharal's wife - soprano
- Ometh, a wounded, chained person - countertenor
- Stoikus, a senior figure of the town - tenor
- Jadek, an old man of the town - baritone
- Stump, a cripple from the town - tenor
- Gerty, a middle-aged woman from the town - mezzo-soprano

The instrumental ensemble consists of: flute (doubling alto flute, piccolo), cor anglais, clarinet (doubling bass clarinet), soprano saxophone (doubling alto saxophone), horn, trombone, percussion (one player), harp, violin, cello, double bass and electronic tape.

== Synopsis ==
The opera is in two parts: Part 1: Prelude, Part 2: Legend (in 5 scenes). A performance lasts approximately 95 minutes. The libretto is based on the traditional story from Jewish folklore of the golem, a figure made of clay or mud, brought to life by a magician in order to be the magician's servant, but who eventually becomes violent and has to be destroyed.

- Prelude: The old Maharal remembers creating a golem when he was a young man.
- Legend
  - Scene 1: The young Maharal creates a golem from the clay lying on the banks of a river.
  - Scene 2: The golem is given the name Olem, taught how to perform simple tasks for his master and sees Miriam for the first time.
  - Scene 3: The golem encounters Miriam and experiences desire for the first time. The Maharal angrily orders him to go into the town.
  - Scene 4: Ometh appears. He and Olem realise that together they could root out evil. The Maharal believes that Ometh's appearance is trickery and does not agree to their plan.
  - Scene 5: Along with other townspeople Stoikus is awaiting the arrival of a saviour. Convinced that the saviour is coming Stoikus becomes uncontrolled and Olem kills him. Ometh appears and is reunited with Olem. The Maharal is determined that Olem should act on his own and becomes exultant, anticipating Olem's future. He sees the dead body of Stoikus and realises what Olem has done.

== Awards ==
The opera was the recipient of the first Britten Award for Composition in 1990.

== Recordings ==
Virgin Classics: Adrian Clarke (Maharal), John Hall (Golem), Patricia Rozario (Miriam), Christopher Robson (Ometh), Paul Wilson (Stoikus), Richard Morris (Jadek), Paul Harrhy (Stump), Mary Thomas (Gerty), Music Projects/London, conducted by Richard Bernas (recording subsequently re-issued on the NMC label).

The recording won the 1991 Gramophone Classical Music Award for Best Contemporary Recording.
