= Besim Korkut =

Bosnian scholar (1904-1975)

- Born: 25 June 1904; Travnik, Condominium of Bosnia and Herzegovina, Austro-Hungarian Empire
- Died: 2 November 1975 (aged 71); Sarajevo, SR Bosnia and Herzegovina, SFR Yugoslavia
- Occupation: Arabist
- Known for: Translation of the Quran into Bosnian language
- Parent(s): Ahmed Munib Korkut and Šahida Biščević

Besim Korkut (1904–1975) was a Bosnian scholar. He is the author of the most popular translation of the Quran into the Bosnian language. His brother was Derviš Korkut.

== Biography ==
He was most likely born in Travnik, although some sources list Sarajevo as his birthplace. He attended Ruždija in Travnik and the District Madrasah in Sarajevo. From 1920 to 1925, he studied at the Sharia Judicial School, and upon graduating in 1925, he went to Cairo and continued his studies at Al-Azhar University. He graduated in 1931, and upon his return to Sarajevo, he was appointed a teacher at the Sharia Judicial School the same year. At this school, he taught Arabic language, stylistics, Sharia, aqidah, and the history of Islam. As a teacher at the Sharia Judicial School, he also taught religious studies at the Men's Gymnasium in Sarajevo for a time. When the Higher Islamic Sharia-Theological School was opened in Sarajevo, and the Sharia Judicial School ceased to operate (June 1937), Korkut was transferred to the Sharia Gymnasium and immediately assigned to work at the gymansium in Mostar as a professor-religious teacher.

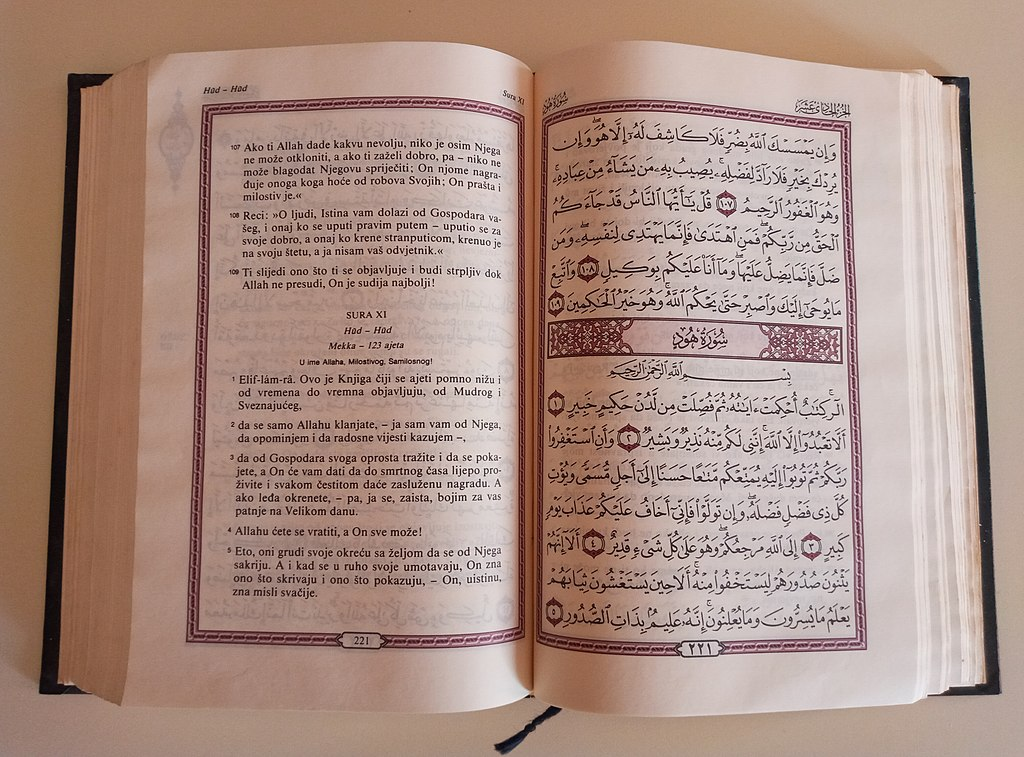
Korkut's translation of the Quran into the Bosnian language

He remained in Mostar until 1940, when he returned to Sarajevo to attend the Sharia Gymnasium, where he remained until the end of 1944. At the same time, he taught Islamic history part-time at the Higher Islamic Sharia-Theological School. After the liberation in 1945, he worked in the Ministry of Education of the People's Government of Bosnia and Herzegovina and the Committee for Higher Education and Scientific Institutions (from 1947 to 1950). Soon after the founding of the Oriental Institute, he moved to work at the Institute and remained there until his retirement in 1969. He retired as a scientific associate of this Institute.

For a time, he taught part-time at the Department of Oriental Studies at the Faculty of Humanities in Sarajevo. He wrote in many Bosnian newspapers and magazines, such as Novi Behar, Gajret, Glasnik VIS-a, and he signed his works with his full name and surname. The crowning achievement of Besim Korkut's scientific and translation work was certainly his complete translation of the Quran into the Bosnian language, on which he worked for more than a decade.

== Translation of the Quran into Bosnian language ==
Besim Korkut worked on translating the Quran into Bosnian language for more than a decade. He translated the Quran from the original Arabic language. However, he did not live to see its publication, which was printed two years after his death, in 1977, first by the Oriental Institute in Sarajevo, and then by the Eldership of the Islamic Community of Bosnia and Herzegovina, Croatia and Slovenia in Sarajevo. This translation is the most widely read and best-rated translation of the Quran into Bosnian language. The translation has gone through many editions. Some of them are also pocket editions.
