= Gollum browser =

Web application for accessing Wikipedia

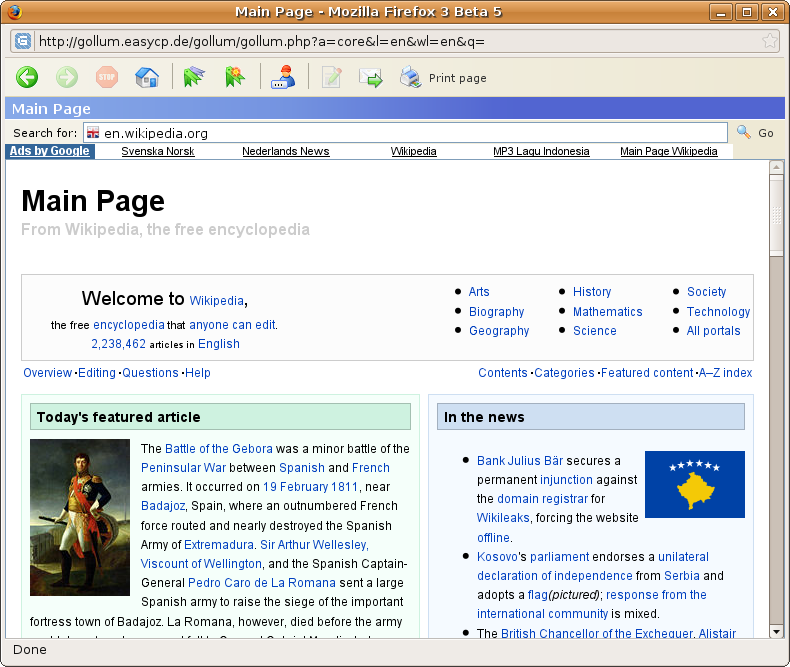
- Screenshot of Gollum displaying the main page of the English Wikipedia (using Mozilla Firefox on Ubuntu)
- Original author: Harald Hanek
- Release: 2005
- Written in: PHP
- Platform: Web browser
- Available in: 32 languages
- Type: web application
- Website: gollum.easycp.de/en/

Gollum browser is a discontinued web browser for accessing Wikipedia. Since 2017, Gollum is no longer accessible online.

Gollum is designed to browse Wikipedia in an easier way than directly using the web browser. Links external to Wikipedia are opened in the user's regular browser. Gollum is opened from a regular browser and makes a window that puts the Wikipedia search bar on the toolbar. Gollum was created by Harald Hanek in 2005 using PHP and Ajax. According to one blogger, Gollum provides a way to bypass censorship of Wikipedia in China.

== Languages ==
Though the website is available only in English and German, Gollum's GUI is available in more than 32 languages and can browse nearly 50 Wikipedia editions.

=== Gollum's GUI ===
- Arabic
- Indonesian
- Bulgarian
- Catalan
- Chinese
- Czech
- Danish
- German
- Estonian
- Greek
- English
- Spanish
- French
- Hebrew
- Croatian
- Italian
- Japanese
- Korean
- Luxembourgish
- Hungarian
- Dutch
- Norwegian
- Norwegian Nynorsk
- Polish
- Portuguese
- Romanian
- Russian
- Finnish
- Swedish
- Tagalog

=== Browsable Wikipedia editions ===
- Arabic
- Bulgarian
- Bosnian
- Catalan
- Chinese
- Croatian
- Czech
- Danish
- Dutch
- English
- Esperanto
- Estonian
- Finnish
- French
- German
- Greek
- Hebrew
- Hungarian
- Icelandic
- Indonesian
- Italian
- * Japanese
- Korean
- Kurdish
- Latin
- Luxembourgish
- Limburgan
- Low German
- Norwegian
- Norwegian Nynorsk
- Persian
- Polish
- Portuguese
- Pushto
- Romanian
- Russian
- Slovak
- Slovenian
- Serbian
- Serbo-Croatian
- Spanish
- Swedish
- Swiss German
- Tagalog
- Turkish
- Ukrainian
- Walloon
- Western Frisian
- Yiddish

== See also ==
- Site-specific browser
