= National minorities in Bosnia and Herzegovina =

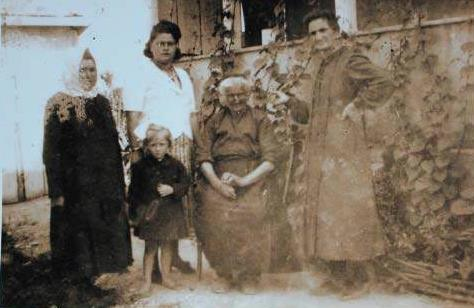
The first Italian immigrants to Štivor, 1883

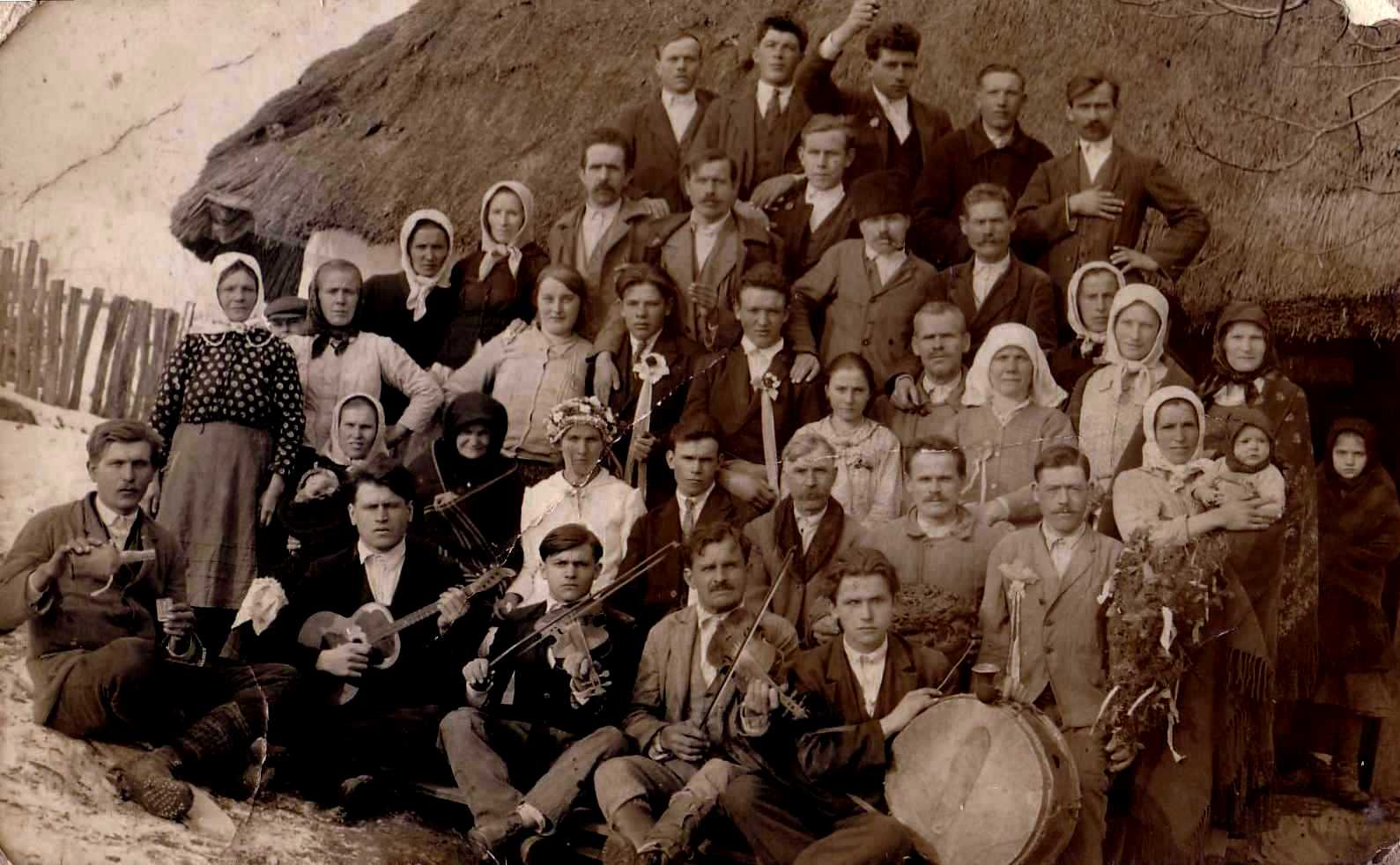
Ukrainians in the Austro-Hungarian Monarchy in 1890, modern Prnjavor

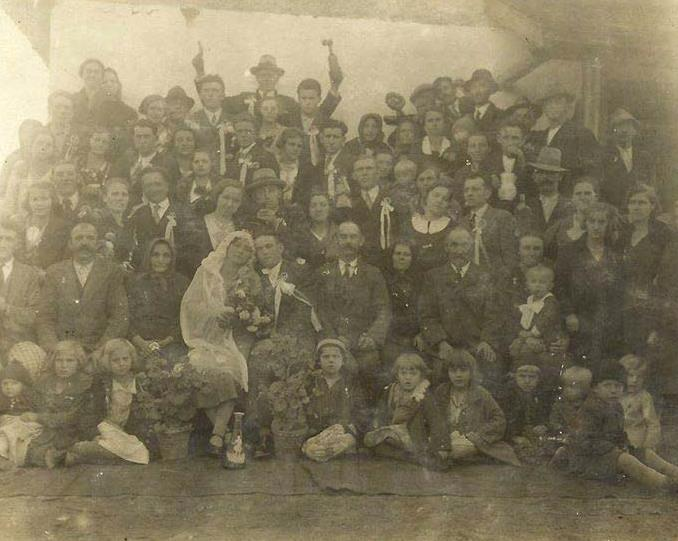
Czech wedding guests in Nova Vesi, near Srbac, 1934

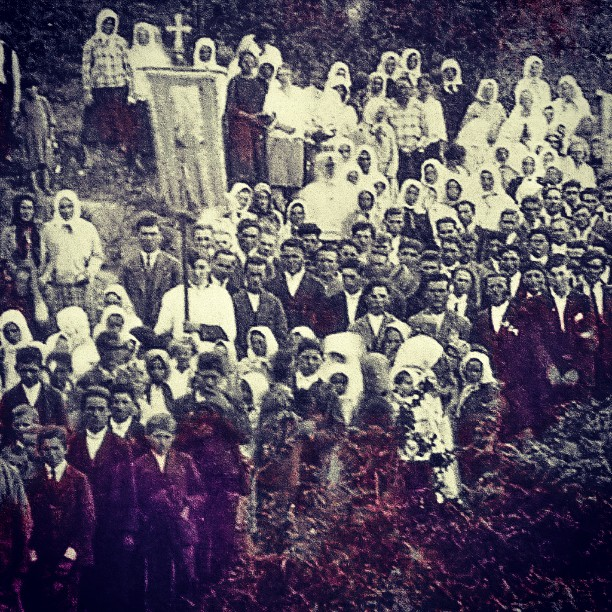
Polish farmers in Bosnia at a procession

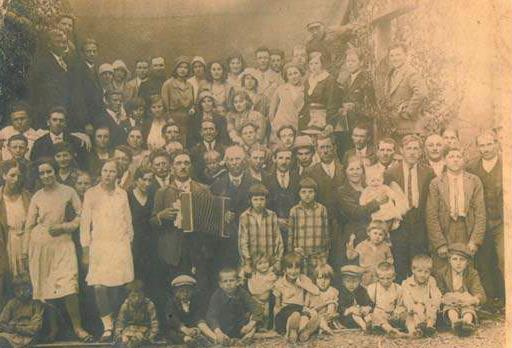
The Slovene Triglav Society, founded in Banja Luka in 1934

The legislation of Bosnia and Herzegovina recognises three constituent peoples and 17 national minorities (nacionalne manjine). These latter include 2.73% of the total population of the country, i.e. 96,539 persons. The biggest community is the Romani people in Bosnia and Herzegovina, which are estimated at around 58,000 persons.

== Legislative framework ==
The state-level Law on the Protection of National Minorities in Bosnia and Herzegovina was adopted in 2003, followed by the Law on the Protection of National Minorities of the Republika Srpska in 2005, and the Law on the Protection of National Minorities in Federation of BiH in 2008. Similar laws were passed also by the Government of the Brcko District of BiH and three cantons of the Federation of BiH. In June 2020 the Brcko District adopted a new Law on the rights of National Minorities.

Bosnia and Herzegovina ratified the European Charter for Regional or Minority Languages in 2010.

== National Minority Councils ==
Since 2006, the Parliamentary Assembly of Bosnia and Herzegovina established the Council of National Minorities, as a special advisory body to give opinions, advice and proposals to the Parliamentary Assembly of BiH on all matters concerning the law, position and interests of national minorities in Bosnia and Herzegovina. The BiH National Minority Council is composed of 17 representatives of national minorities, one representative on behalf of each ethnic minority.

The National Minority Council of the Federation of Bosnia and Herzegovina entity was established in March 2016.

The National Minority Council of the Republika Srpska entity was established in 2005.

The National Minority Council of Sarajevo Canton was established in 2012, with extended powers of legislative initiative.

The National Minority Council of the Brcko District was established in May 2022, on the basis of the new district law on national minorities adopted in October 2020

== Associations ==
In Bosnia and Herzegovina exists more than 100 national minority CSOs. Generally, associations operate individually or within the alliances. The Association of National Minorities of Republika Srpska (ANMRS) was established in 2003 as a voluntary and open non-partisan association of citizens. It gathers, as an umbrella organisations, 40 member associations of national minorities in Republika Srpska.

== Education in minority languages ==
Italian and Ukrainian are taught in one and four schools respectively in the town of Prnjavor (15 and 24 pupils in total in 2015).

German, Russian, and Italian are taught as foreign languages in several high schools throughout the country.

Associations and embassies also organise several elective courses of minority languages as foreign languages.

Several newsletters and bulletins are published periodically in minority languages, including four in Slovene, and one each in Hungarian (Új dobos), Macedonian (Vinozito), Italian (Stella d'Italia) and Czech (Banjalucki Krajani)

== Demographics ==
Minority	1991 census	2013 census	Associations
Albanians in Bosnia and Herzegovina	4,925	2,659+150 (self declared: Kosovars, Shqiptars, Bosnian-Albanians etc.)	
Czechs in Bosnia and Herzegovina			Česká beseda
Germans in Bosnia and Herzegovina			
Hungarians in Bosnia and Herzegovina			Association of Hungarians Sarajevo HUM
Italians in Bosnia and Herzegovina			Association of Italians of the City of Banja Luka; Association of Citizens of Italian Origin (Sarajevo); UGIP "Rino Zandonai" Tuzla
Jews in Bosnia and Herzegovina			
Macedonians in Bosnia and Herzegovina	1,596	738	Association of Macedonians of RS
Montenegrins of Bosnia and Herzegovina	10,071	1,883	
Poles in Bosnia and Herzegovina	526	258	Association of Poles "POLSA"
Romani people in Bosnia and Herzegovina	8,864	12,583 (est. 58,000)	84 associations; BiH Roma Committee
Romanians in Bosnia and Herzegovina			
Russians in Bosnia and Herzegovina			
Ruthenians in Bosnia and Herzegovina			
Slovaks in Bosnia and Herzegovina			
Slovenians in Bosnia and Herzegovina		937	Slovenian Cultural Association "Cankar" Sarajevo
Turks in Bosnia and Herzegovina	267	1,108	
Ukrainians in Bosnia and Herzegovina		2,331	

Population of Bosnia and Herzegovina according to ethnic group 1948–1996
Ethnic group	census 1948		census 1953		census 1961		census 1971		census 1981		census 1991		census UNHCR 1996		census 2013		popul.change 1991-2013	
Ethnic group	Number	%	Number	%	Number	%	Number	%	Number	%	Number	%	Number	%	Number	%	Number	%
Bosniaks	788,403	30.7	891,800	31.3	842,248	25.7	1,482,430	39.6	1,629,924	39.5	1,902,956	43.5	1,805,910	46.1	1,769,592	50.11	-133,364	+6.64%
Serbs	1,136,116	44.3	1,264,372	44.4	1,406,057	42.9	1,393,148	37.2	1,320,644	32.0	1,366,104	31.2	1,484,530	37.9	1,086,733	30.78	-279,371	-0.43%
Croats	614,123	23.9	654,229	23.0	711,665	21.7	772,491	20.6	758,136	18.4	760,852	17.4	571,317	14.6	544,780	15.43	-216,072	-1.95%
Yugoslavs					275,883	8.4	43,796	1.2	326,280	7.9	242,682	5.5			2,570	0.07		
Montenegrins	3,094	0.1	7,336	0.3	12,828	0.4	13,021	0.3	14,114	0.3	10,071	0.2			1,883	0.05		
Roma	442	0.0	2,297	0.1	588	0.0	1,456	0.0	7,251	0.2	8,864	0.2			12,583	0.36		
Albanians					3,642	0.1	3,764	0.1	4,396	0.1	4,925	0.1			2,569	0.07		
Others/undeclared	23,099	0.9	27,756	1.0	28,679	0.8	36,005	1	63,263	1.5	80,579	1.9	58,196	1.5	110,449	3.12		
Total	2,565,277		2,847,790		3,277,948		3,746,111		4,124,008		4,376,403		3,919,953		3,531,159			

== See also ==
- 1991 census
- 2013 census
- Demographics of Bosnia and Herzegovina
- Demographic history of Bosnia and Herzegovina

== Notes ==
- on the short-lived Polish/Ukrainian community of BIH, see Husnija Kamberovic's paper "Iseljavanje Poljaka iz Bosne i Hercegovine 1946. godine."
