= John Casken =

English composer (born 1949)

John Arthur Casken (born 15 July 1949) is an English composer.

Casken was born in Barnsley, West Riding of Yorkshire, England. While at Barnsley Grammar School in the 1960s his music teacher played a recording of Berg's Violin Concerto, which had a lasting influence. He studied composition at the University of Birmingham with John Joubert and Peter Dickinson. He attended the Warsaw Academy of Music between 1971 and 1972, where he studied with Andrzej Dobrowolski but also met and became friends with Witold Lutosławski. He has lectured at the universities of Birmingham (from 1973) and Durham (from 1981), and between 1992 and 2008 he was Professor of Music at the University of Manchester. Casken's students include Michael Alcorn, David Jennings and James MacMillan.

Casken lives in Northumberland. He has acknowledged the landscape as a significant influence on his work. Works such as the orchestral Orion Over Farne (1984), the unaccompanied choral work To Fields We Do Not Know (1985), (described as "a Northumbrian elegy"), the orchestral song-cycle Still Mine (1992), the ensemble piece Winter Reels (2010) and the choral Uncertain Sea (2014) have all drawn inspiration from Northumberland. Casken has also composed two operas: Golem (1988), which has been revived frequently, and God's Liar (2000), the latter based on Tolstoy's novella Father Sergius.

His Cello Concerto of 1991 was written for Heinrich Schiff. The Violin Concerto was premiered at the 1995 Proms with Dmitri Sitkovetsky as soloist, and the Oboe Concerto Apollinaire’s Bird (written for Stéphane Rancourt) and Trombone Concerto Madonna of Silence (written for Katy Jones) were premiered by the Hallé Orchestra in 2014 and 2019 respectively. There is also the Symphony Broken Consort (2004), performed at the 2004 Proms, a Concerto for Orchestra (2007), and a Double Concerto for Violin, Viola and Orchestra That Subtle Knot (2013).

Casken has written much chamber music, including three string quartets, the first in 1982. The Piano Trio (2003) uses themes from the opera God's Liar as its source material. He wrote Rest-ringing, unusually scored for string quartet and orchestra, for the Lindsay Quartet in 2005.

Recent work has shown a renewal of interest in musical theatre, with the melodrama Deadly Pleasures for narrator and small ensemble, based a poem by D M Thomas concerning the life of Cleopatra, and a monodrama, Kokoschka’s Doll, premiered at the Cheltenham Festival in 2017, about Alma Mahler's relationship with the painter Oskar Kokoschka. A CD of Kokoschka’s Doll was released in 2020.

In October 2025, he received an Ivor Novello Award nomination for his piece Mantle for piano and wind quintet.
