= Enver Halilović =

Former Bosnian ambassador

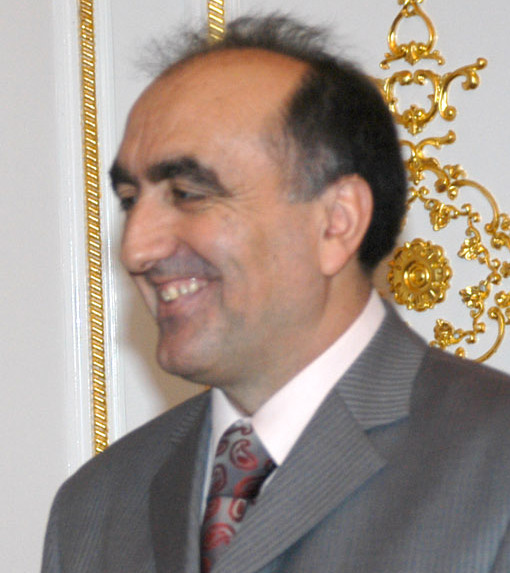
In 2005

Enver Halilović is a former ambassador of Bosnia and Herzegovina to Russia.

== See also ==
- Embassy of Bosnia and Herzegovina in Moscow
