= El Golem =

Poem by Jorge Luis Borges

"El Golem" is a poem by Jorge Luis Borges, published in 1959, and later published as part of the 1964 book El otro, el mismo (The other, the self). The poem tells the story of Judah Loew and his creation of the Golem. In the poem, Borges quotes the works of German Jewish philosopher Gershom Scholem and Cratylus by Plato.

== Background ==
Borges was fascinated by Kabbalah all his life, and besides El Golem, wrote 3 other texts relating to Kabbalah: Una vindicación de la Cábala(1932), Del Culto de los Libros(1951), and La Cábala(1980). He also wrote an uncompleted essay in the 1940s, also titled La Cábala. Additionally, there is a section dedicated to the Golem in Borges' Book of Imaginary Beings. Borges was also influenced by Gustav Meyrink's work The Golem, which he read in his youth and cited as having influenced his own poem.

== Summary ==
The poem is a retelling of the legend of Rabbi Judah Loew and the Golem. Loew creates an artificial man using the sacred name of God, but his creation is flawed - the rabbi cannot hope to repeat the act of creation that God did. In the end, the rabbi comes to the revelation that he is also an imperfect creation of God and no different from the golem. The poem explores the idea that human-created language systems are inherently limited and how reality cannot be confined to language and words, and the idea that creation is necessarily imperfect.
