= Enver Koso =

Bosnian handball player

Personal information
- Nationality: Bosnian
- Born: 5 May 1956 (age 69); Goražde, Yugoslavia

Sport
- Sport: Handball

Enver Koso (born 5 May 1956) is a Bosnian handball player. He competed in the men's tournament at the 1980 Summer Olympics.
