= Enver Aliyev =

Enver Aliyevich Aliyev (Russian: Энвер Алиевич Алиев; 5 August 1927– 23 May 2017) was a Crimean Tatar cotton farmer, who received the title Hero of Socialist Labour. His son Ali is an accomplished physicist in the field of nanotechnology.

== Personal life ==
Aliyev was born on 5 August 1927 to a Crimean Tatar family in Crimea. His father was a driver, and his mother worked in a printing house. He had three siblings. In 1944, he was deported from Crimea because he was Crimean Tatar. His son Ali is a professor at the University of Dallas. In April 1990 he returned to Crimea, and died there on 23 May 2017.

== Labor and politics ==
He began working as a on a collective farm once he arrived in the Uzbek SSR in 1944. He often impressed Sharof Rashidov with his diligent work, and in 1966 he became a member of the Communist Party. For his high productivity as a tractor driver, on 10 December 1973 he was awarded the title Hero of Socialist Labour. In 1973 he supported a letter signed by many Crimean Tatars asking the Soviet government to allow them to Crimea.

== See also ==
- Mustafa Chachi
- Seit Tairov
