= Enver Galim =

Enver Galim (March 15, 1915, Kazan, Russian Empire – March 2, 1988, New York, US), Tatar writer and journalist, was one of the translators of the Bible into the Tatar language.

After graduating from the Institute of the Tatar Language and Literature in 1938, Enver Galim worked as a school teacher and a journalist. He was drafted into the Red Army in 1941 and sent to the front to fight against Nazi Germany. A year later, he was severely wounded and captured by German soldiers. After spending a few months in the POW camp, Enver Galim was released. Fearing repression in Stalin's USSR, he decided to stay in Germany. To avoid deportation, he applied for Turkish citizenship and, after receiving it, changed his name to Enver Galimoglu.

After the war, he continued his career as a journalist, writing articles for the magazine Azad Vatan and other publications. Between 1953 and 1988, Ebver Galim worked for the Tatar-Bashkir Service of Radio Liberty. After 1968 he was Radio Liberty's correspondent based in New York. He contributed numerous articles and analyses to Problems of the Peoples of the USSR, the Turkish-language magazine Dergi, and the Russian-language newspaper Vestnik. One of his major works was the translation of the Bible into the Tatar language.

== See also ==
- Tatar alphabet
- Tatar language
