= Enver Sekiraqa =

Kosovar mobster

- Born: 18 November 1974 (age 51); Pristina, Kosovo
- Status: Escaped
- Criminal charges: Incitement to commit serious murder, coercion
- Penalty: 25 years in prison
- Wanted since: August 2007
- Escaped: 17 May 2024

Details
- Victims: Triumf Riza
- Date: 30 August 2007
- Locations: Pristina, Kosovo
- Date apprehended: 28 September 2012

Enver Sekiraqa (born 18 November 1974) is Kosovo's previous most wanted man, and was sought by the Kosovo Police and Interpol in connection with an investigation into organized crime and murder of police officer Triumf Riza. He was arrested in Pristina in September 2012 when he handed himself over to EULEX and the Kosovo Police after four years on the run.

Since his arrest, he has been convicted three separate times for the crimes of incitement to commit serious murder and coercion, Sekiraqa was also originally charged for rape, but these charges were later dropped in the first trial. In his first trial, Sekiraqa was sentenced to 37 years on 17 May 2016. This was appealed and reduced to 30 years on 16 September 2019, and appealed a second time and reduced to 25 years on 3 May 2024.

Two weeks after his third and most recent trial, police were unable to locate Sekiraqa when they arrived to apprehend him. Due to a court decision after this trial, Sekiraqa was allowed to be free while waiting for the court decision to be finalized, with no detention measures put in place; and by the date of 17 May 2024, when the Court of Appeal had accepted Sekiraqa's 25 year sentence, he was not found at his residence. This escape has put the judges' of Sekiraqa's case into question and even brought up concerns of corruption, with Albulena Haxhiu, Kosovo's Minister of Justice, saying "This case, among others, also raises suspicions of involvement in corruption, therefore there should be a professional investigation and responsibility from those who made this escape possible".

== Sekiraqa Bar bombing 2007 ==
On the morning of 24 September 2007, a C4 explosive detonated inside a coffee bar owned by Sekiraqa near Bill Clinton Boulevard in Pristina, killing two people and injuring 11 others. This bomb was found to be planted and detonated by six police officers, in an apparent attempt at intimidation towards Sekiraqa. Two of the policemen who enacted this attack were arrested and convicted for first degree murder, serious injuries and inciting public risk, and a further two were arrested in connection to the attack.
