= Enver Imamović =

Bosnian archaeologist (born 1940)

Professor Enver Imamović
- Born: 29 October 1940 (age 85); Fojnica

Academic background
- Education: University of Zagreb
- Thesis: Ancient Cult and Votive Monuments at in the area of the inner part of the Roman province of Dalmatia (1974)

Academic work
- Discipline: Archaeologist
- Institutions: University of Sarajevo

Enver Imamović (29 October 1940) is a Bosnian archaeologist and historian. Imamović's area of interest is ancient past of the Balkan Peninsula, and the history of early medieval Bosnia.

== Biography ==
Imamović was born on 29 October 1940, in Fojnica. He graduated from high school in Sarajevo in 1960, went on to study archaeology in 1965 at the Faculty of Philosophy in Zagreb. He received his doctorate from the Faculty of Philosophy at the University of Belgrade in 1974 with a thesis on Ancient Cult and Votive Monuments at in the area of the inner part of the Roman province of Dalmatia. In 1968, he was elected an assistant, in 1976 an assistant professor, in 1979 an associate professor, and in 1986 a full professor at the department of general ancient history of the Faculty of Philosophy in Sarajevo.

Imamović went through specialisation on ancient studies at the University of Rome, he also taught as a visiting professor at the universities of Cairo, Minya, New Delhi, Bombay and Calcutta. He participated in archaeological expeditions in Tibet, Nepal, India, Thailand, the Andes, the Galapagos and the Amazon region. During the Bosnian war between 1992 and 1995, he was the director of the National Museum, and since 1995 he has been the president of the National Committee of the International Museum Council (ICOM) for Bosnia and Herzegovina.

== Journals and annuals ==
Imamović collaborated in the journals such as Istorijski zapisi (Titograd 1972, 1975, 1978), Jadranski zbornik (1972), Naše starine (1972), Otočki ljetopisi (1973, 1975, 1980), Yearbook of the Center for Balkanological Studies of ANUBiH (1974), Contributions of the Institute for history in Sarajevo (1975–76, 1978, 1980, 1990), Yearbook of the Society of Historians of Bosnia and Herzegovina (1976), Proceedings of the Faculty of Philosophy in Sarajevo (1976, 1980), Gazette of the National Museum of Bosnia and Herzegovina (1979–80, 1996), Notices of the Croatian of the Archaeological Society (1983), Tribunia (1983), Proceedings of the Archaeological Society of BiH (1983), Dometi (1984), Acta historico-oeconomica Yugoslaviae (1987), Annales de l'Institut français de Zagreb (1987), Kabes (1998), and other.

== Bibliography ==
- Antički kultni i votivni spomenici na području Bosne i Hercegovine (1977)
- Nerezine na otoku Lošinju (1979)
- Povijesno-arheološki vodič po Osoru (1979)
- Olimpijske igre u starom vijeku (1984)
- Otoci Lošinj i Cres od ranog srednjeg vijeka do konca XVIII stoljeća (1987)
- Korijeni Bosne i bosanstva (1995)
- Porijeklo i pripadnost stanovništva Bosne i Hercegovine (1998)
- Historija bosanske vojske (1999)
- O Sarajevskoj hagadi (2009)
- On the Sarajevo Hagadda (2009)
- Afroditin grijeh (2009)
- Ajvaz-dedin san (2012)
- Korijen i život Bosanskog plemstva kroz historiju (2018)
- Pogibija braće Morić (2021)
- Propast Bosanskog kraljevstva (2025)
