= Science to Youth Movement =

- Type: Public scientific organization for Youth
- Purpose: Research, Education
- Headquarters: Sarajevo
- Location: Bosnia and Herzegovina
- President: Muriz Spahić, PhD
- Staff: 10 employers, and numerous volunteers
- Website: Official former website
- Formerly called: Movement "Science to Youth"

Science to Youth Movement (Serbo-Croatian: Pokret Nauku mladima), formerly Alliance of Young Researchers of Bosnia and Herzegovina" until 1992. It acted within the "People's Technique of Bosnia and Herzegovina, the Association of Innovators" established in 1946. However, the Faculty of Science, University of Sarajevo oversaw organization, activities, management, administrative service and accommodation of the movement. The first organizers and presidents were professors for the University of Sarajevo's Faculty of Sciences .

== Function ==
The Movement’s activities were organized as networks of local young researchers at the annual festivals of the B&H, and at the federal level of the Former Yugoslavia. The participants, mostly high school students, competed to test their knowledge of natural sciences and mathematical sciences in the freely selected topics. The works were written in the form of graduation/diploma theses. They were then defended to the professors of the Faculty of Sciences and the Faculty of Biotechnical and Biomedical sciences, and the National Museum of Bosnia and Herzegovina. Three prizes were awarded annually, in the form of books.

Bi-weekly or monthly summer schools were commonly held in historically notable cities/locations, such as Tjentište, Boračko jezero, Treskavica – Vučja Luka (Wolf Harbour) Jezero (near Jajce) and others.

Many engaged activists from the Faculty of Sciences received the highest awards of the Movement and the "People's Technique" (which can be found by searching the Internet).

== See also ==
- University of Sarajevo
- National Museum of Bosnia and Herzegovina
