= National Museum of Bosnia and Herzegovina =

National museum

Coordinates: 43.8545°N 18.4025°E

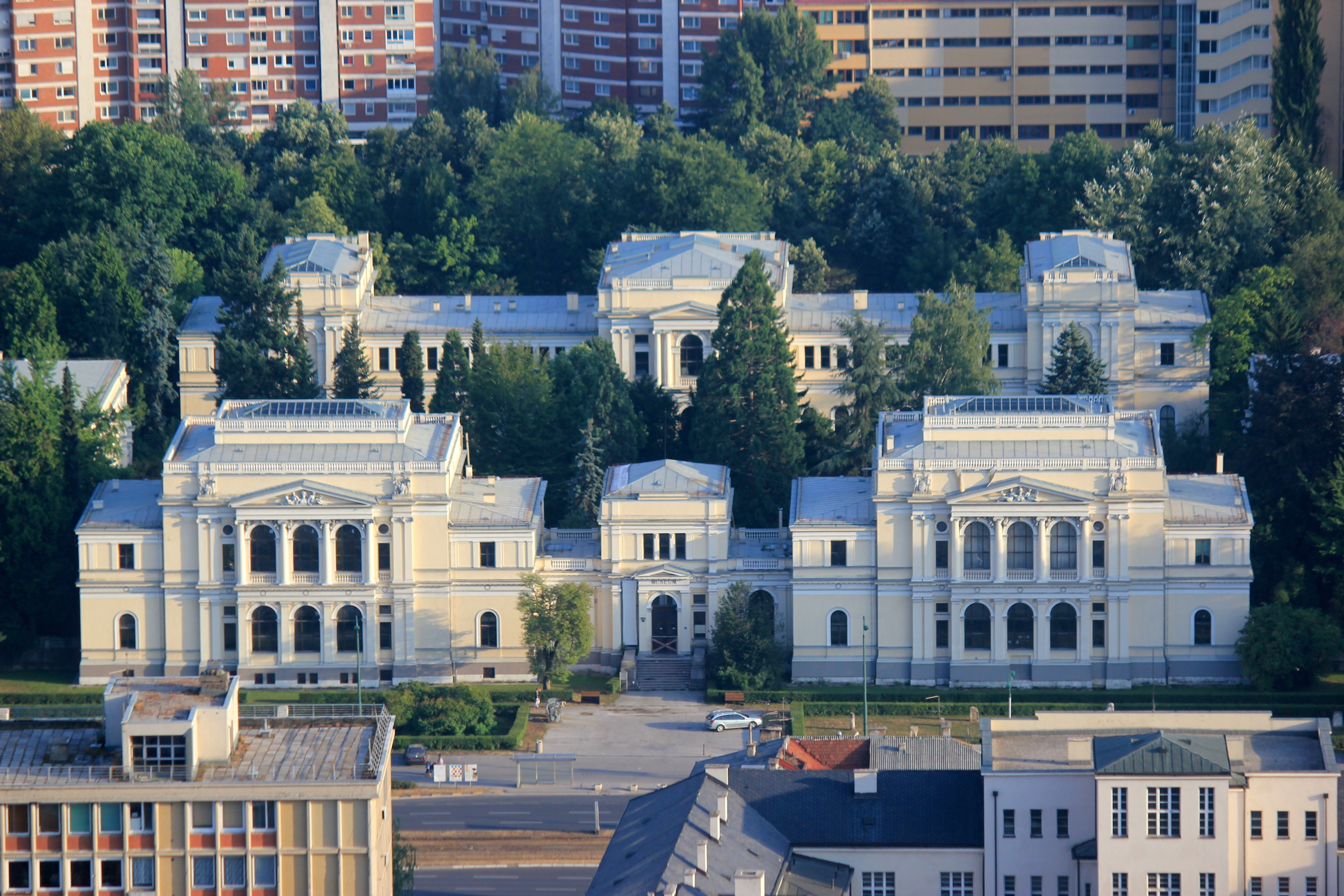
- Aerial photo of the National Museum – what is today backside of the complex (second row facing tree-alley) was main entrance and frontal facade before
- Established: 1888 (Conceived in 1850)
- Location: Ulica Zmaja od Bosne 3
- Website: www.zemaljskimuzej.ba

The National Museum of Bosnia and Herzegovina (Bosnian and Croatian: Zemaljski muzej Bosne i Hercegovine) is located in central Sarajevo, the capital of Bosnia and Herzegovina.

It was established in 1888, having originally been conceived around 1850 and expanded in 1913 by the Czech architect Karel Pařík adding four symmetric pavilions that contain the departments of archaeology, ethnology, natural history, and a library.

The museum is a cultural and scientific institution covering a wide range of areas including archaeology, art history, ethnology, geography, history and natural history. The Sarajevo Haggadah, an illuminated manuscript and the oldest Sephardic Jewish document in the world issued in Barcelona around 1350, containing the traditional Jewish Haggadah, is held at the museum. It has a library with 162,000 volumes.

After being closed for several years due to heavy damage during the Bosnian War, the museum has re-opened and is in the process of mounting new and pre-existing exhibits. The museum was closed between 2012 and 2015 due to disagreements about funding.

== Architecture ==
In 1913, the museum building was expanded by the Czech architect Karel Pařík who designed and added a structure of four symmetric pavilions with a facade in the Italian Renaissance Revival style. These pavilions enclosing a space in between forming a museum's specious courtyard. This courtyard is used as a botanical garden around which various stone monuments are exhibited. These monuments consist mostly of relocated stećaks. The four pavilions contain the departments of archaeology, ethnology, natural history, and a library.

== History and governance ==
=== Museum development ===
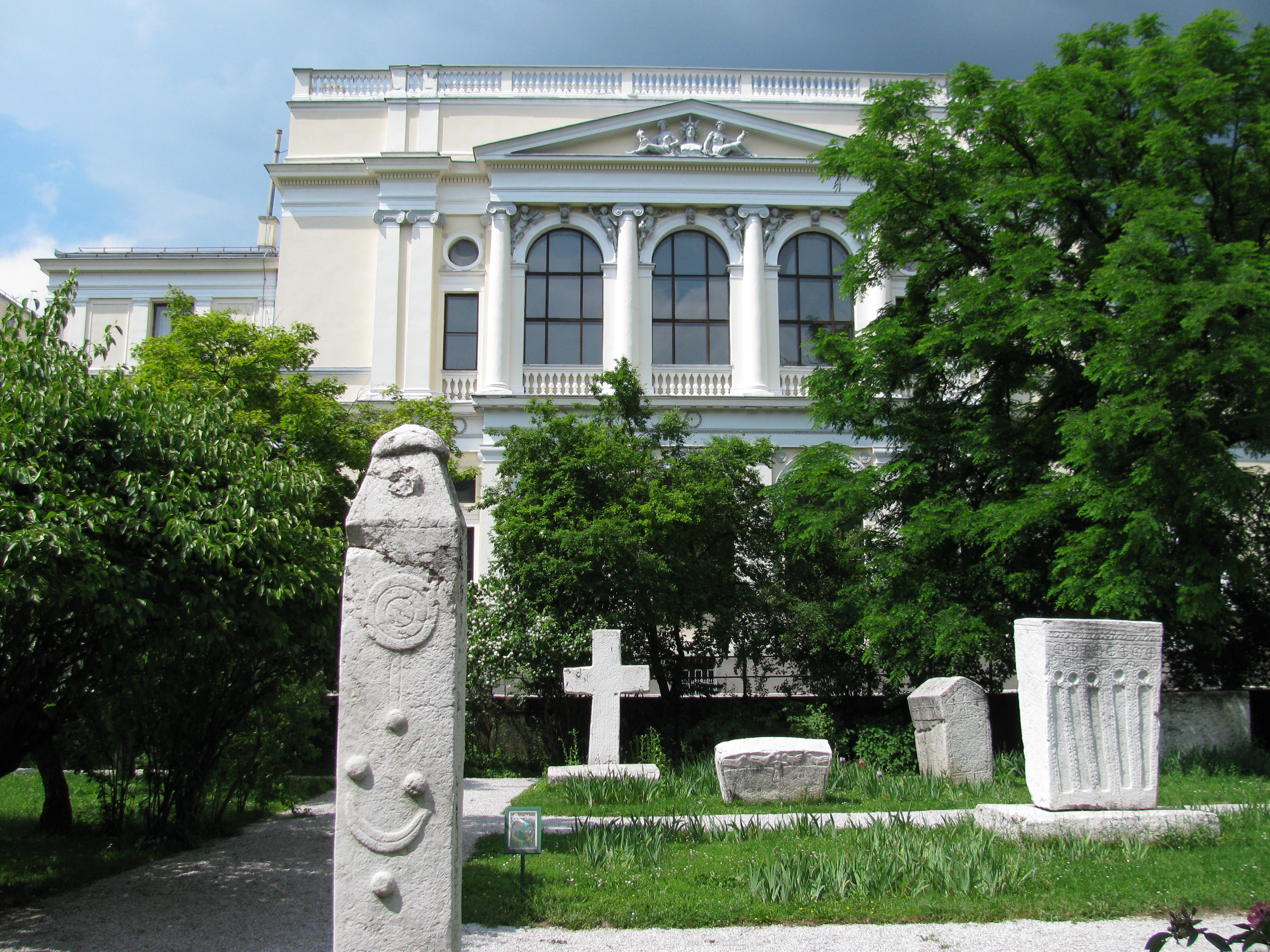
Medieval tombstones in National Museum of Bosnia and Herzegovina courtyard's botanical garden.

The museum is a cultural and scientific institution in Bosnia and Herzegovina. Though conceived in 1850 as an idea by the Ottomans when they ruled Sarajevo, it was not until the rule of the Austro-Hungarian Empire (which captured modern day Bosnia and Herzegovina from the Ottomans in 1878) that the museum was officially established and built.

==== 1888–1913 ====
Part of the Austro-Hungarian policy goals was to raise literacy levels and maintain European-standard education. Under their administration, a Museum Society was formed on February 1, 1888, in order to further this agenda in the form of a museum. The first director of the museum was Kosta Hörmann, an advisor to the Austro-Hungarian government. Greatly influenced by the orientation of 19th-century European science heuristics and culture, the museum's collection under Hörmann grew rapidly especially in the departments of natural history and archaeology. By the early 20th century, the museum began to outgrow its original premises and in 1908, construction on a new building to house the museum's collections began. Construction on the new building completed in 1913 and the museum was officially opened on October 4 of that year. Throughout this all, the museum was funded by the Austro-Hungarian's departments of education and culture as well as by private donations and charity events led by the Museum Society.

==== 1913–1991 ====
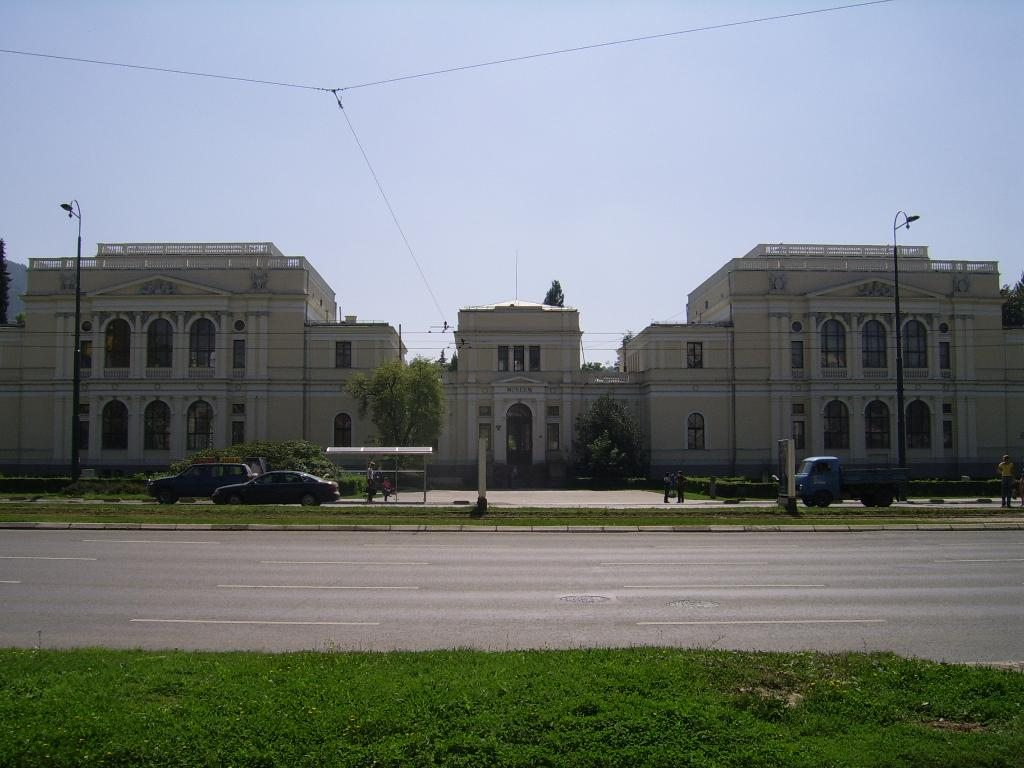
National Museum of Bosnia and Herzegovina

With the opening of the museum in its new home in 1913 (where it still remains), its collections that varied from history, geography, archaeology (prehistoric, ancient and mediaeval), ethnology, history of art and natural history (biology, geology and mineralogy), and to some extent language, literature, statistics and bibliography, were divided into four buildings based on a new set of categories: Archaeology, Ethnology, Natural History, and the Library.

Two years later in 1914, as World War I began, the museum suspended its operations. After the end of the war in 1918, which was followed by the first union of the South Slavs, the museum resumed its operations under the administration of what was then called the Kingdom of Serbs, Croats and Slovenes, which was later known as Yugoslavia. Under this administration, which lasted during the interwar years of 1918–45, a hegemonic centralized administration was developed in which the judicial branch of government along with the Serbian bourgeoisie, paid very little economic and cultural attention to Bosnia and Herzegovina. This led to an abrupt socio-economic, political and cultural decay in Sarajevo as it found itself in the margins of the Kingdom. The National Museum thus lost much of its funding and clout and was beginning to lose its ability to maintain and archive its artifacts. As World War II approached in 1941 (and lasted until 1945), the National Museum's troubles further developed as its opportunities to operate diminished. It was during this war-time period that the National Museum experienced the least activity and development.

After World War II, under a Socialist Yugoslavia, the National Museum made slow progress until the early part of the 1960s. Culture was declared to be of special importance for society by the Socialist Government and this period in time marked some of the National Museum's highest achievements in scientific research and publishing activities and exhibitions. (See the publications)

During this period, was significant the contribution of Museum's Natural departments in the development of the Movement “Science to Youth" – Alliance of Young Researchers of Bosnia and Herzegovina.

==== War years 1992–1995 ====
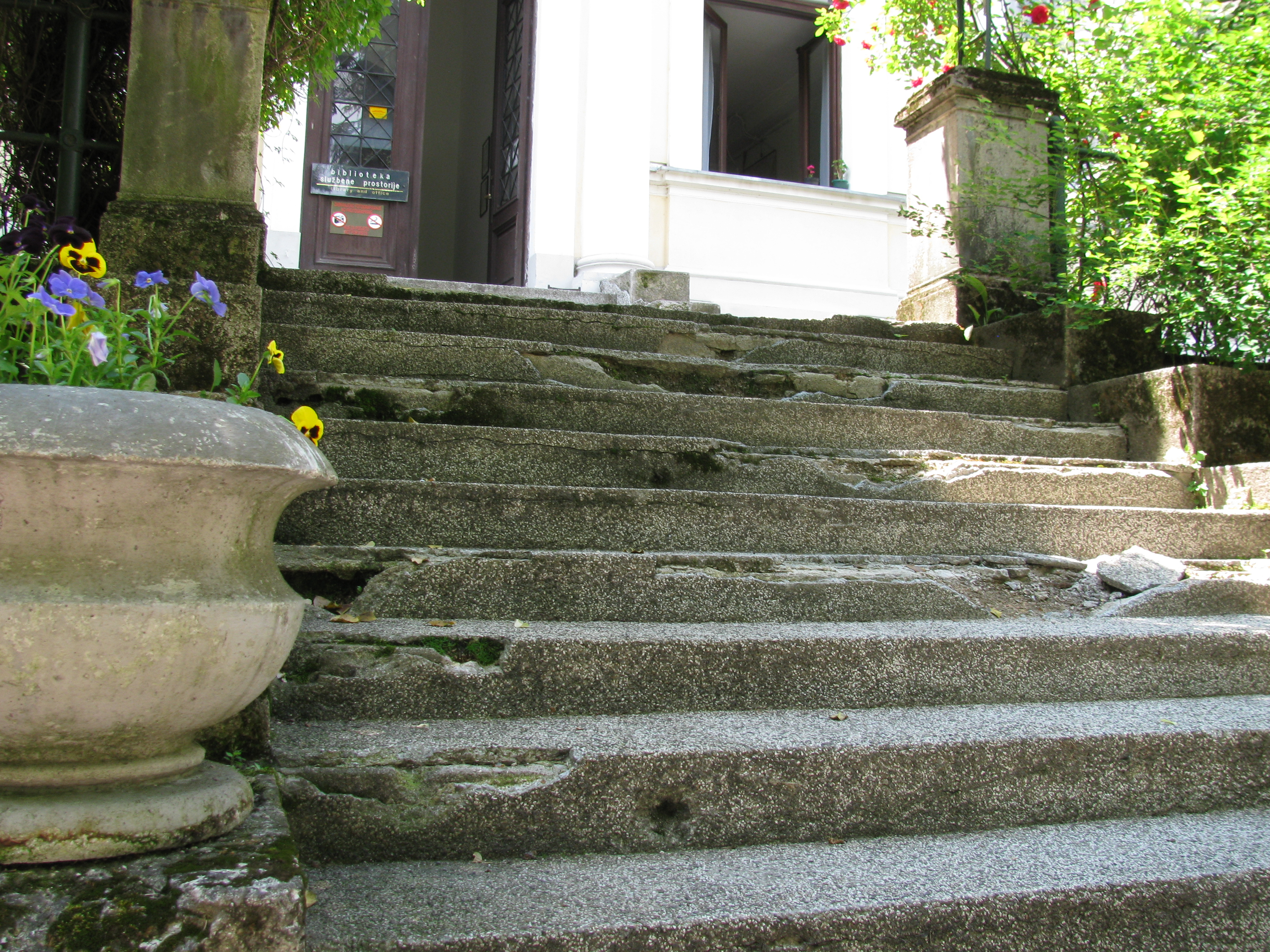
Structural damage in Museum's courtyard (botanical garden), sustained in 1992–95.

The War in Bosnia and Herzegovina in 1992–95 not only ended the prolific activity of the National Museum, but it directly caused structural damage to the building. During this time, artillery shells crashed through the roof, 300 windows were broken, and many of its gallery walls torn down. Sections of the museum's artifacts and archives that could not be hidden were exposed to the elements or artillery. The museum's director at the time, Dr. Rizo Sijarić, was killed by a grenade blast on December 10, 1993, while he was arranging the holes in the museum's building to be covered by UN relief plastic sheeting. Nevertheless, it never closed completely.

==== 1995–2012 ====
After the end of the war, the museum reopened as a work in progress thanks to numerous donations and contributions by: the Institute for Protection of Cultural Monuments and National Museum, the Historical and Natural Heritage of Bosnia and Herzegovina, UNESCO, the Federal Ministry of Education, Science, Culture and Sport, the Institute for Planning and Construction of the City of Sarajevo, the International Peace Center in Sarajevo, Swiss museums, Swiss ICOM and the Swiss National Museum in Zurich, BHHR, Norks Folkesmuseum from Oslo, the Swedish Cultural Heritage without Borders Foundation, the Museum of Natural History, the Museum of Ethnography, the Museum of Islamic Art and other Swedish museums, as well as many others.

==== Closure 2012–2015 ====
After 2010 the museum began to run out of funds; during 2011 the museum's 65 employees came to work for over a year without being paid.

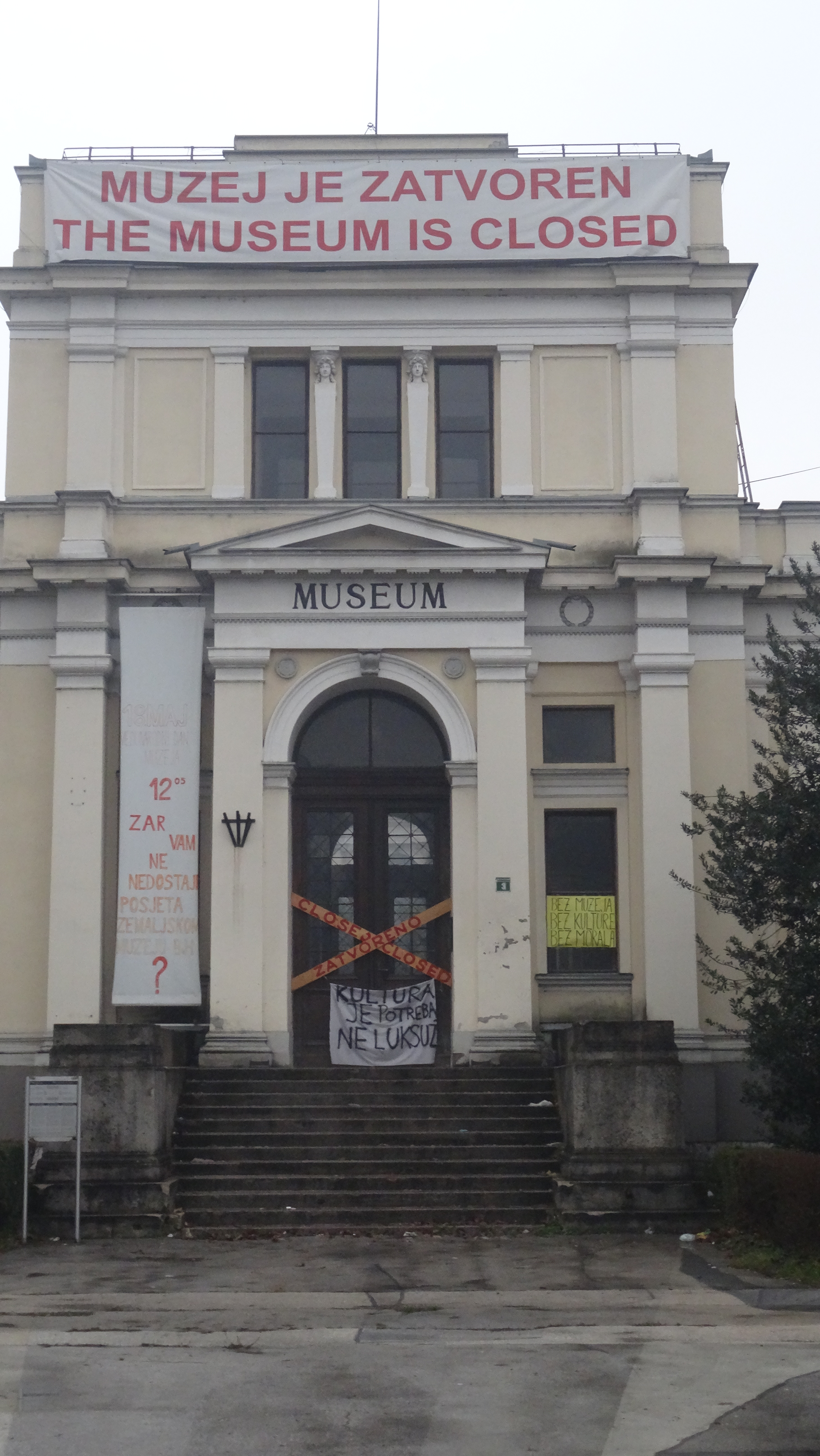
National Museum of Bosnia and Herzegovina - posters on entrance

On 4 October 2012, the National Museum of Bosnia and Herzegovina closed its doors completely and indefinitely, the first time in 124 years. The Council of Europe noted: "After the war the different cultural groups, who define themselves as nations, have all wanted their own national cultural institutions.", leading to the neglect of the former national institutions such as the museum, the Historical Museum and the National and University Library.

Demonstrations took place to protest the closure. Several students chained themselves to a pole in the lobby and remained inside, declaring they would stay there until the museum reopened, while dozens of others held a sit-in in front of the building.

During the shutdown, staff continued to work unpaid, safeguarding the collection and the building.

==== 2015- ====
The museum reopened its doors to the public in September 2015, following an agreement between the different layers of Bosnia's complex government pledging financing for the museum and six other national cultural institutions.

== Departments and exhibitions ==
=== The Department of Archaeology ===
The Department of Archaeology includes sections for prehistory, ancient history, mediaeval history, documentation and a conservation laboratory. The archaeological collections document all aspects of human life in Bosnia and Herzegovina from the Old Stone Age to the late Middle Ages. The artifacts of the collections have mainly been collected during field research, though some have been acquired by exchange, gift or purchase.

==== Exhibitions ====
Bosnia and Herzegovina in Ancient History, Bosnia and Herzegovina in the Middle Ages.

=== The Natural History Department ===
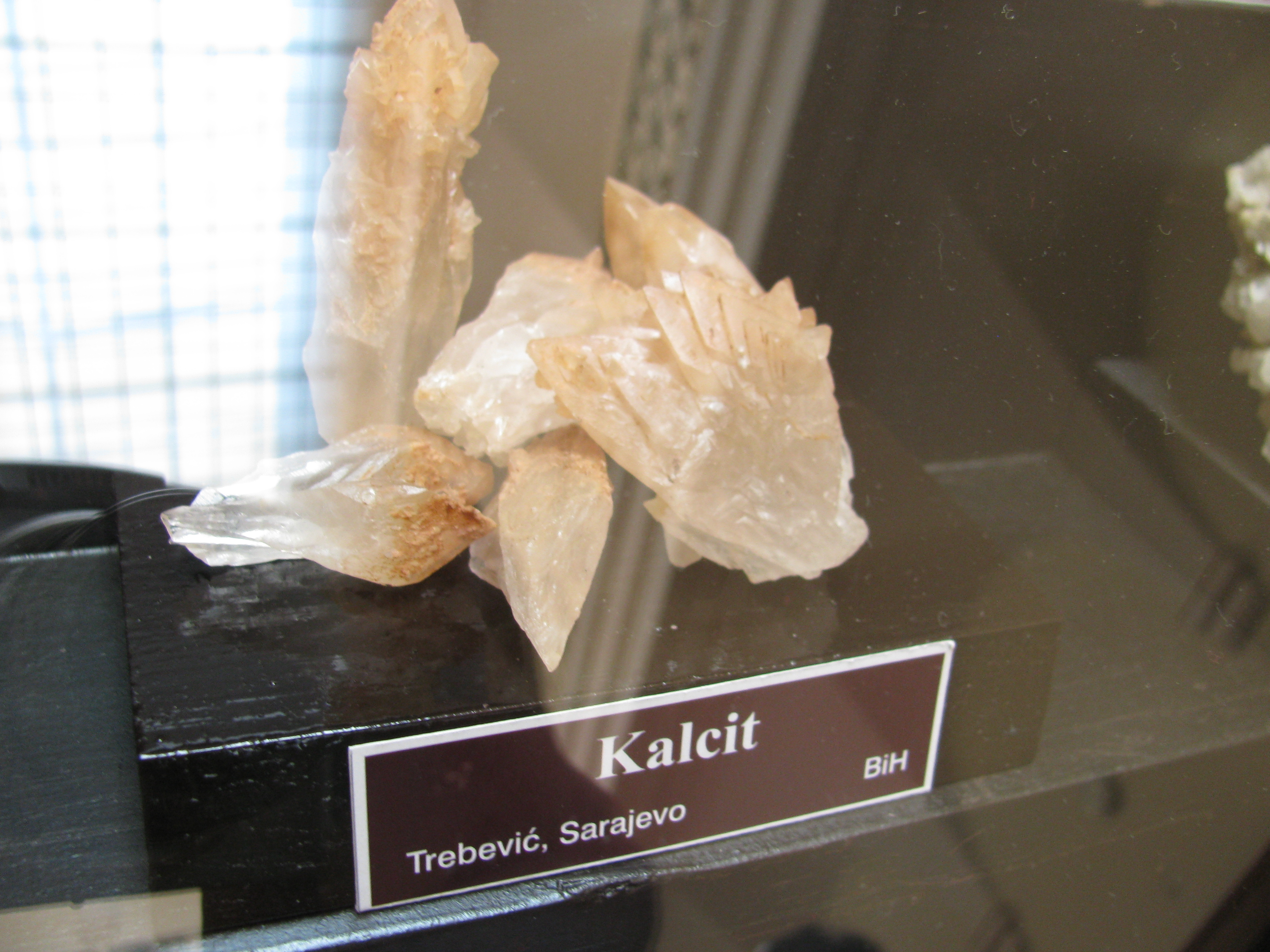
Calcite Crystal found at Trebević mountain around Sarajevo; Bosnia and Herzegovina on display at National Museum of Bosnia and Herzegovina.

The Natural History Department covers the flora and fauna and the geology of Bosnia and Herzegovina and elsewhere, consisting of around 2,000,000 specimens collected from field research, exchange, gift or purchase. The department consists of a Geology Section, a Zoology Section and a Botany Section, the latter including the Botanical Garden.

==== Exhibitions ====
Botanical Garden, Pleistocene and subfossil vertebrates of Bosnia and Herzegovina, Fauna of mountain rivers and streams, Cave fauna, Minerals, Rocks and ores, Flora and fauna of Bosnia and Herzegovina, Higher fungi (Macromycetes, Medicinal plants and endemic plants of the Dinarides, Mammals, Invertebrates and Birds of Bosnia and Herzegovina.

=== The Ethnology Department ===
The Ethnology Department is responsible for collecting, preserving, exhibiting and studying all aspects of the material, spiritual and social culture of the peoples of Bosnia and Herzegovina. Since 1913, the department has been arranged to illustrate a traditional urban house in Bosnia and Herzegovina. The collection of ethnological material began when the museum was established in 1888, with the purchase of some very valuable ethnological artifacts such as sets of traditional costume. The department is engaged in museological work, scientific research and educational work.

==== Exhibitions ====
Dioramas and models, The life and Culture of Bosnia and Herzegovina's Urban Population in the 19th century. - temporary exhibition.

=== Botanical garden and the courtyard ===
A building is designed of four symmetric pavilions with a facade in the Italian Renaissance Revival style. Pavilions enclosing a space in-between forming a museum's courtyard.

==== Exhibitions ====
A courtyard is specious and used to house a botanical garden. Around are exhibited various stone monuments, mostly relocated stećaks among which is one of the most important examples, the Zgošća Stećak and the Zgošća Pilar.

=== The Library of the National Museum ===
The Library of the National Museum of Bosnia and Herzegovina was opened in 1888 as the first scientific library in Bosnia and Herzegovina. It contains about 250,000 publications (journals, periodicals, books, newspapers) in the fields of archaeology, history, ethnology, folklore, mineralogy, geology, botany, zoology and museology. Publications are now exchanged with 341 institutions.

== Sarajevo Haggadah ==
The Sarajevo Haggadah, a 600-year-old Jewish manuscript, and one of Bosnia's most prized relics, is housed in a high-security glass case. The manuscript, handwritten on bleached calfskin, dates to the once-thriving Jewish community in Spain and describes events ranging from the Creation to the Jewish exodus from ancient Egypt to the death of Moses. It is estimated to be worth over 7 million dollars.

New York's Metropolitan Museum of Art offered in November 2012 to host the relic for three years, but the country's Commission for the Preservation of National Monuments rejected the offer due to the unresolved legal status of the National Museum. Additionally, moving the document to New York would have required special care, for which the funds needed to prepare for the transfer were unavailable.

In 2025, the museum was criticized by several Jewish organizations such as the Anti-Defamation League after the former announced that proceeds from ticket sales to view the manuscript would be donated to Palestinian victims of Israeli actions in the Gaza war.

== Herald of the Museum and journals ==
The Gazette (Herald) of the National Museum of Bosnia and Herzegovina (Bosnian: Glasnik Zemaljskog Muzeja Bosne i Hercegovine) is the oldest scientific journal in the country, with a first issue published on 1 January 1889. Herald was published quarterly, and its first editor was Kosta Hörmann.

- Glasnik Zemaljskog Muzeja Bosne i Hercegovine English: Gazette of the National Museum of Bosnia and Herzegovina
- Anali Zemaljskog Muzeja Bosne i Hercegovine u Sarajevu English: Annals of the National Museum of Bosnia and Herzegovina

== Publications ==
- "Zbornik srednjovjekovnih natpisa Bosne i Hercegovine" I (1962), II (1964), III (1964), IV (1970)
- Sergejevski, D.: "Bazilika u Dabravini" (1956)
- Benac, A. & Čović, B.: "Glasinac" I (1956), II (1957)
- Pašalić, E.: "Antička naselja i komunikacije u BiH" (1960)
- Čulić, Z. : "Narodne nošnje u BiH" (1963)
- Buturović, Đ.: "Narodne pjesme Muslimana u BiH" (1966)
- Vuković, T. & Ivanović, B.: "Slatkovodne ribe Jugoslavije" (1971)
- Đurović, E, Vuković, T. & Pocrnjić, Z. : "Vodozemci BiH" (1979)
- Šilić, Č.: "Monografija rodova Satureja L, Calamintha Miller, Micromeria Bentham, Acinos Miller i Clinopodium L. u flori Jugoslavije" (1979)
- Trubelja, F. & Barić, LJ. : "Minerali BiH" Vol. I, Silikati (1979)
- Čović, B.: "Pod kod BugojnA. Naselje bronzanog i željeznog doba u centralnoj Bosni" I: Rano bronzano dobA. (1991)
- Mediaeval tombstones of Bosnia and Herzegovina,
- "Radimlja", (1950) Benac, A.
- "Široki Brijeg", (1952) Benac A.
- Sergejevski, D. "Ludmer", (1952)
- Vego, M. "Ljubuški", (1954)
- "Anali Zemaljskog Muzeja Bosne i Hercegovine u Sarajevu" (1961, 1938 - 1962, 1963, 1964, 1966)
- "Spomenica stogodišnjice rada Zemaljskog muzeja BiH 1888 - 1988" (1988)
- Proceedings of the Scientific Conference "Minerali, stijene, izumrli i živi svijet BiH" (1988)
- International Symposium "Bosna i Hercegovina u tokovima istorijskih i kulturnih kretanja u jugoistočnoj Evropi" (1988).

== Notable staff ==
- Nada Miletić - archaeologist.

== Gallery ==
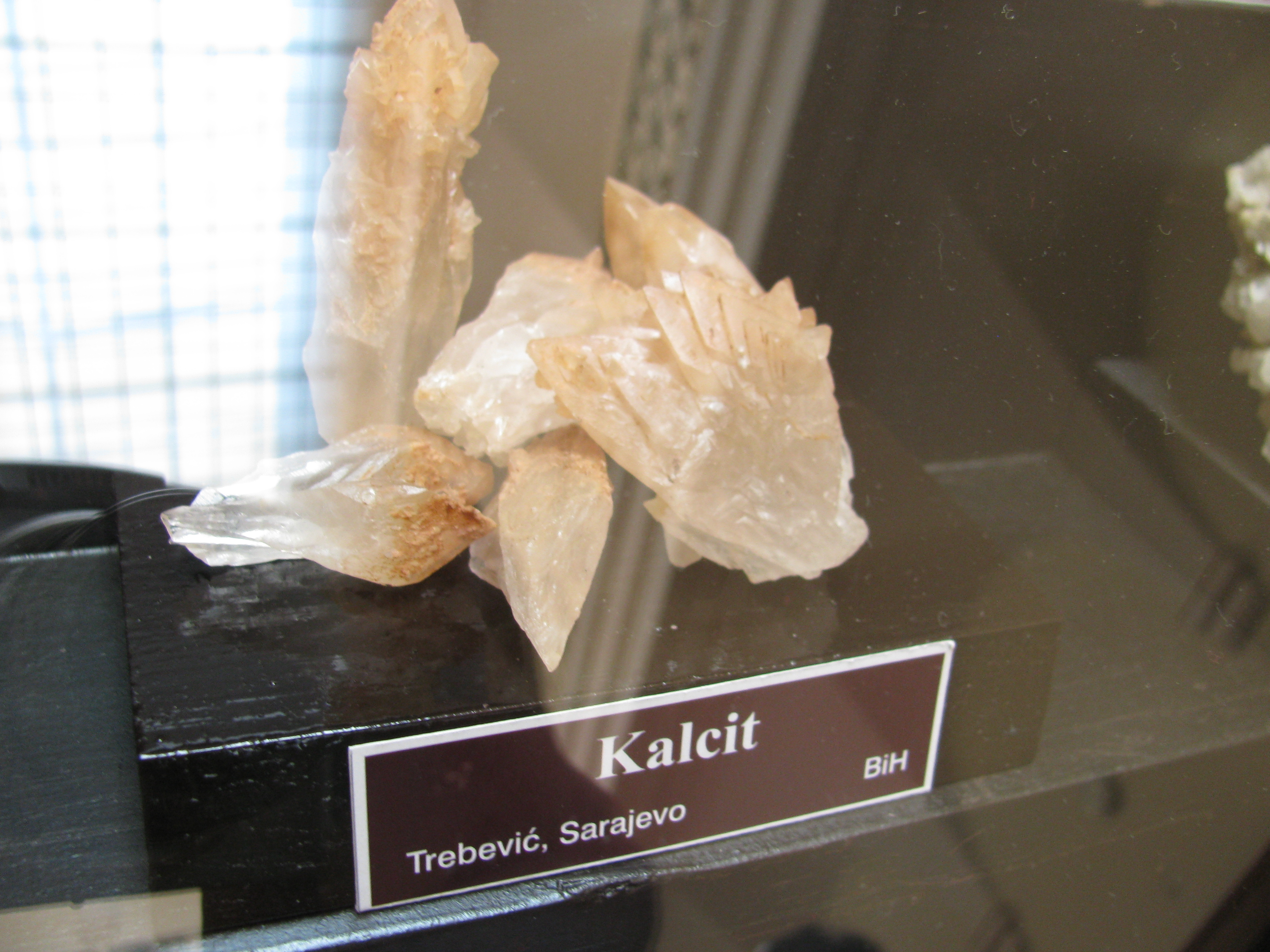
Calcite crystal from Trebević on display at the museum

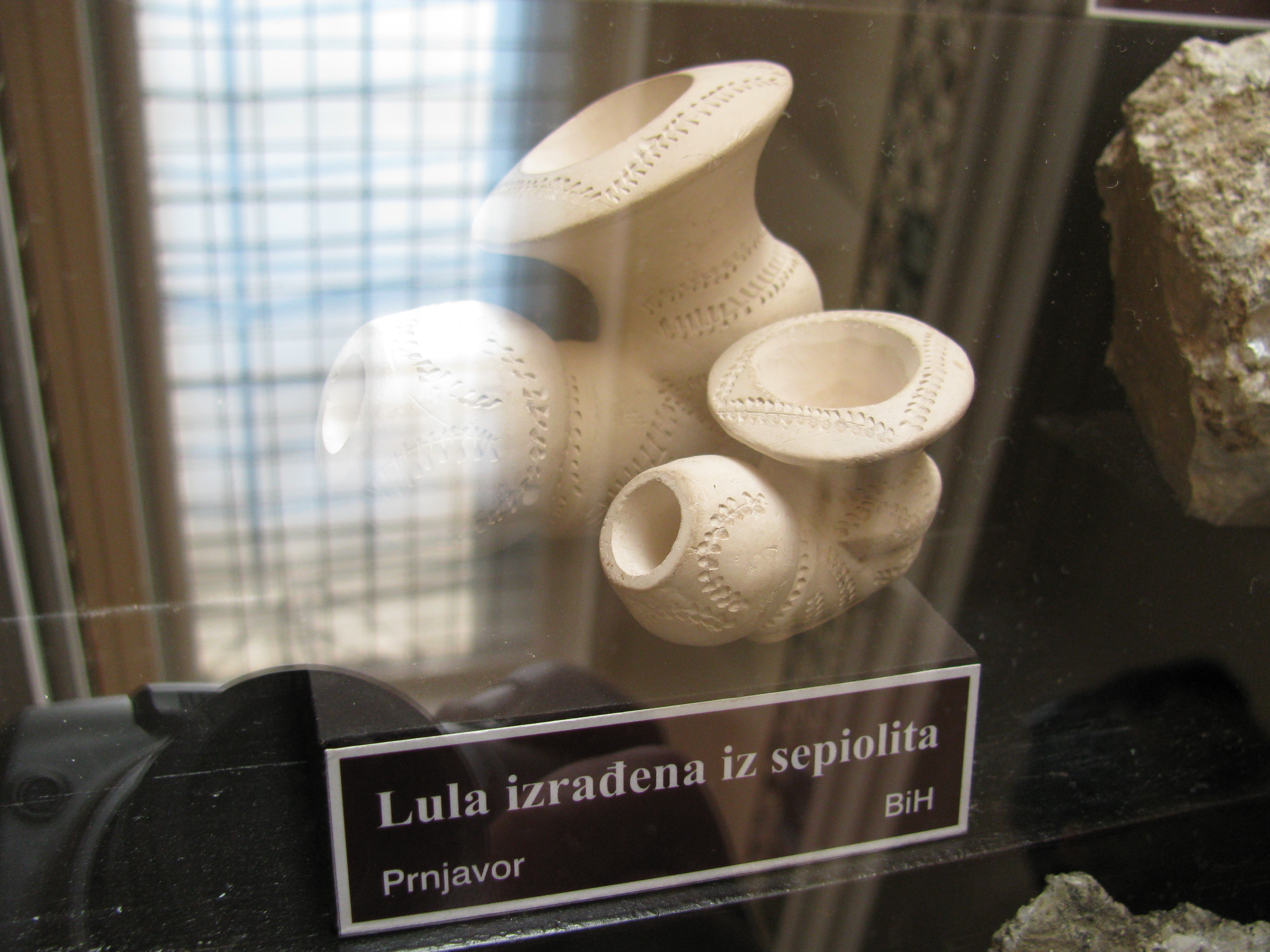
Smoke pipe made out of sepiolite from Prnjavor

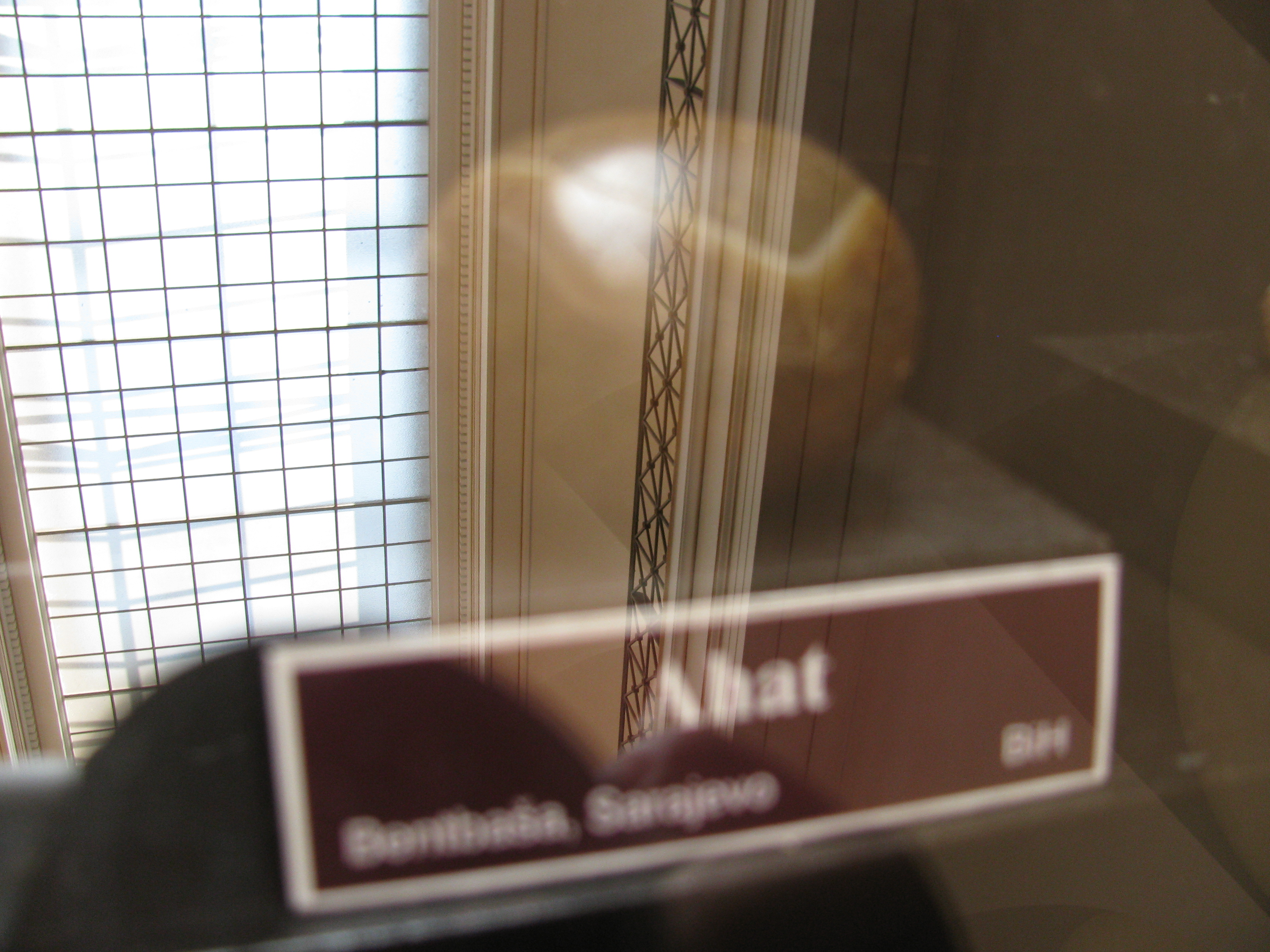
Sarajevo Agate from Bentbaša region.

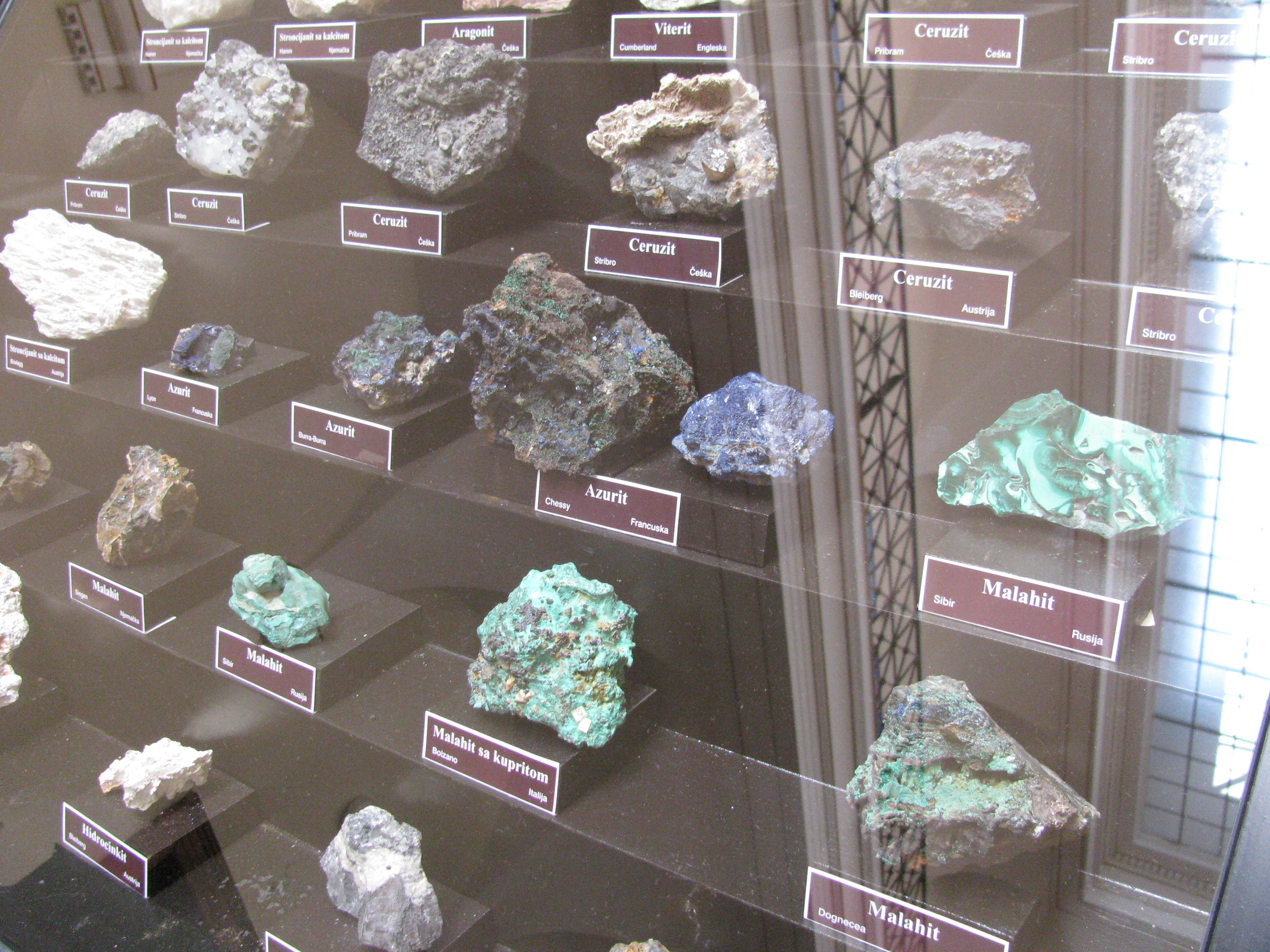
Museum minerals on display

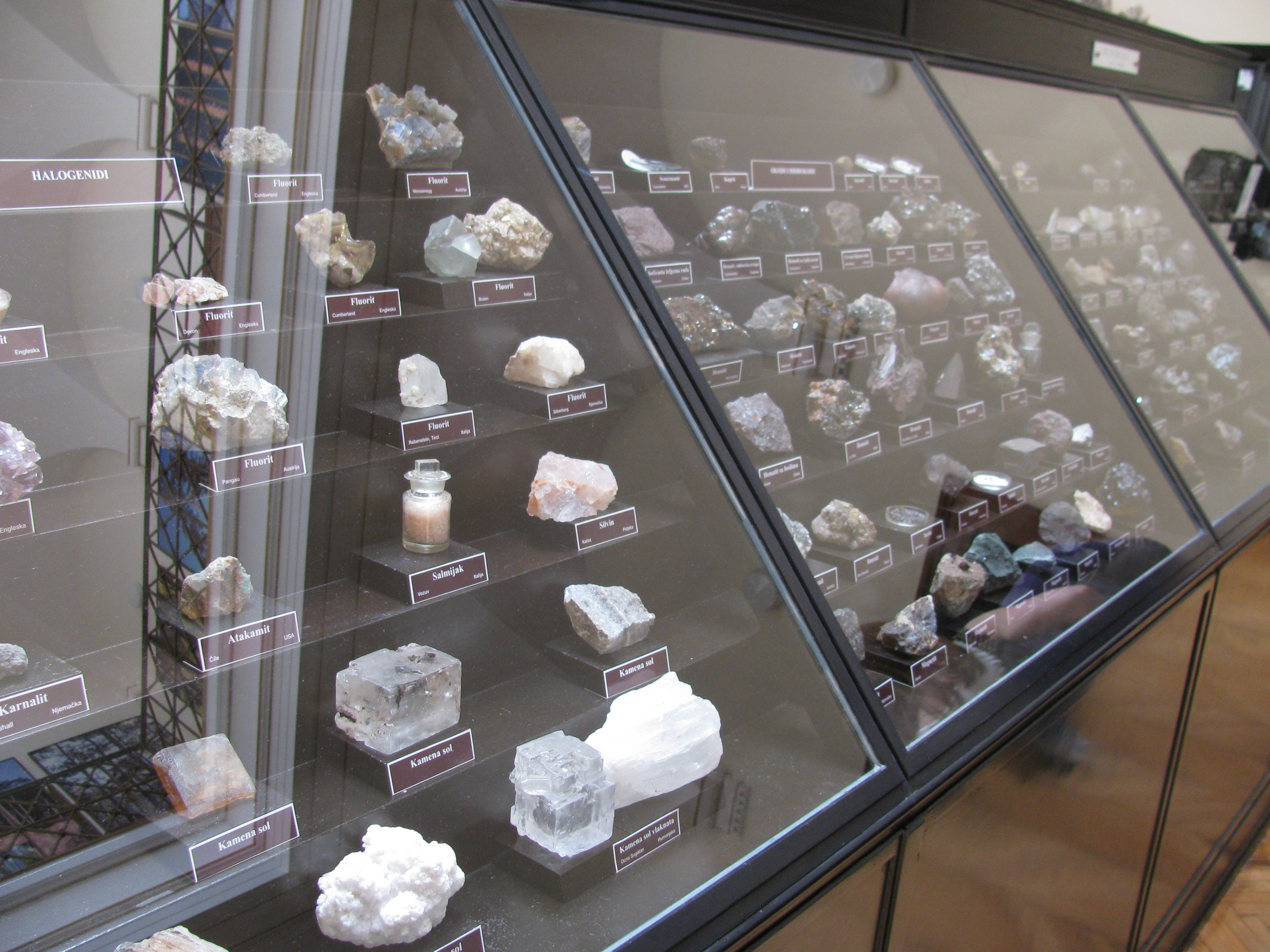
Museum rocks on display

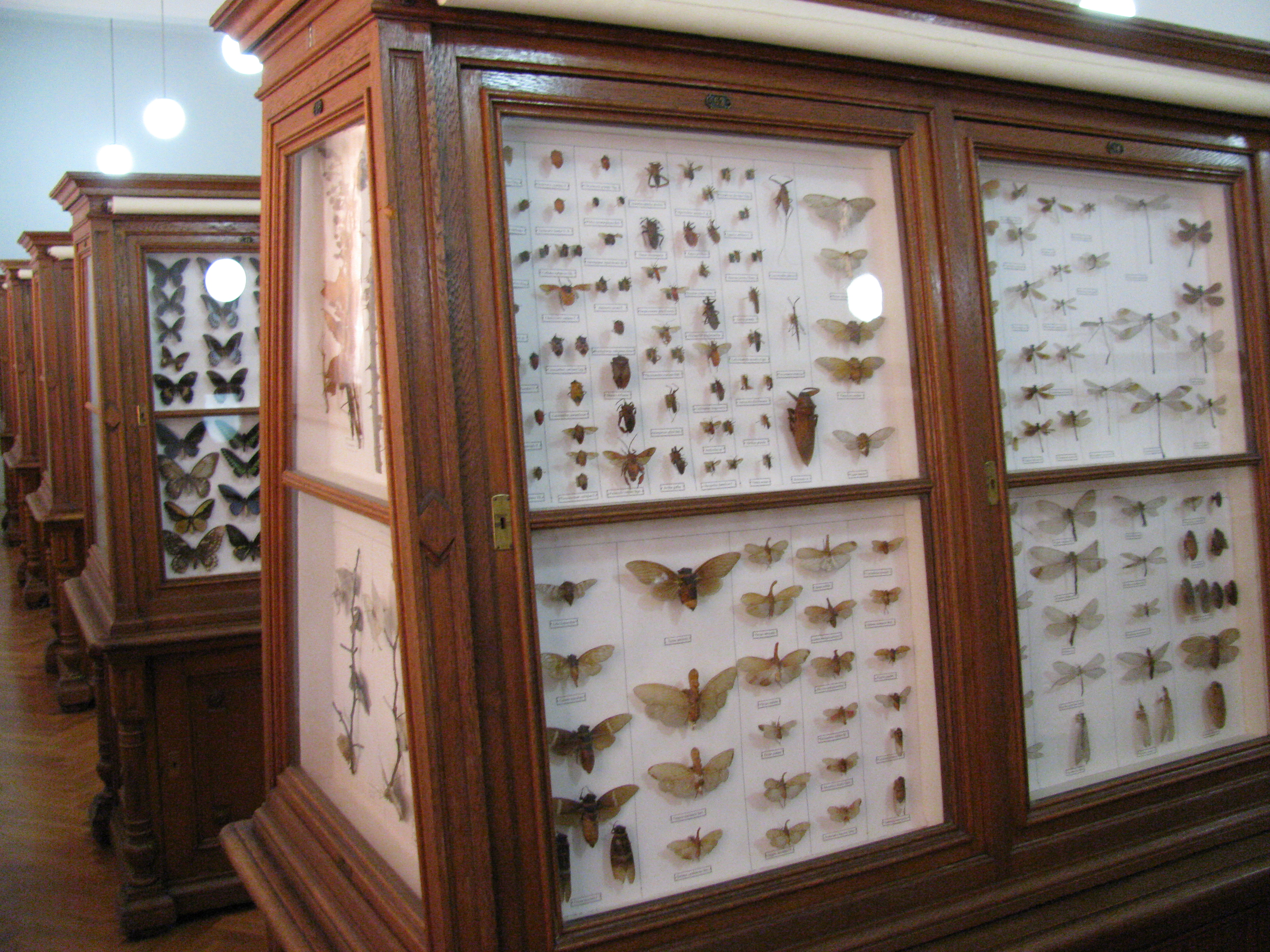
Butterfly collection

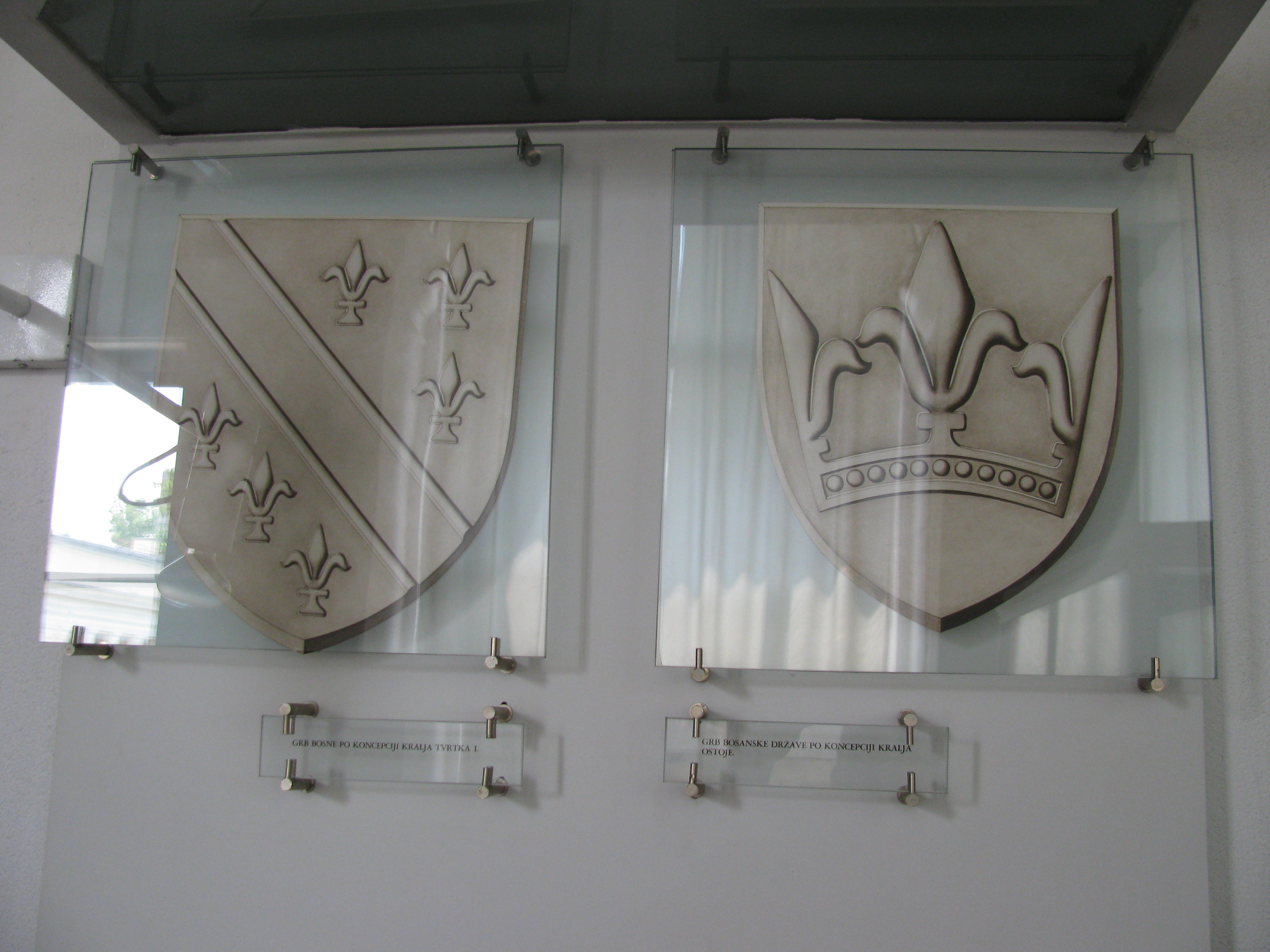
Coat of arms Kings of Bosnia.

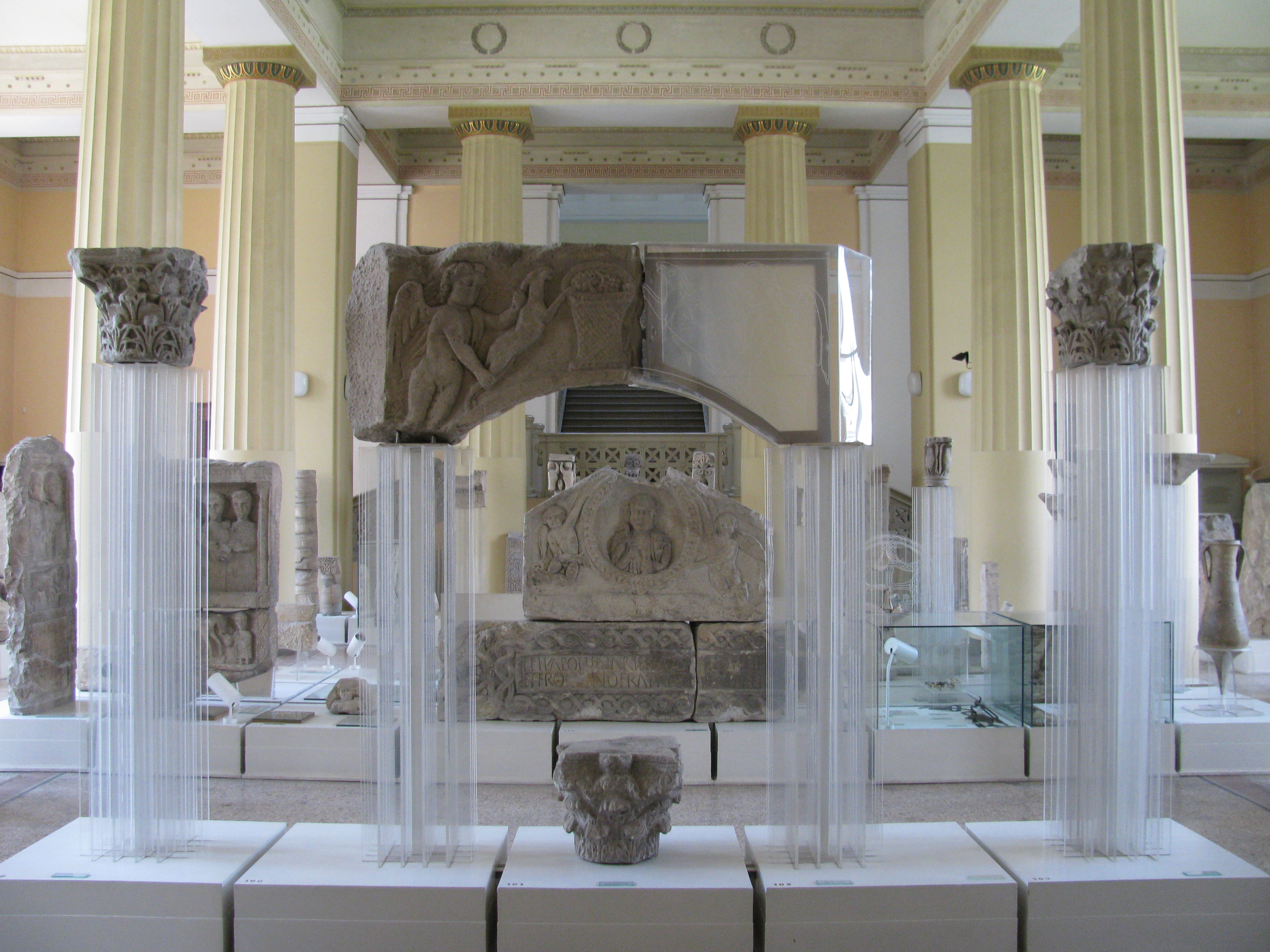
Museum inside view

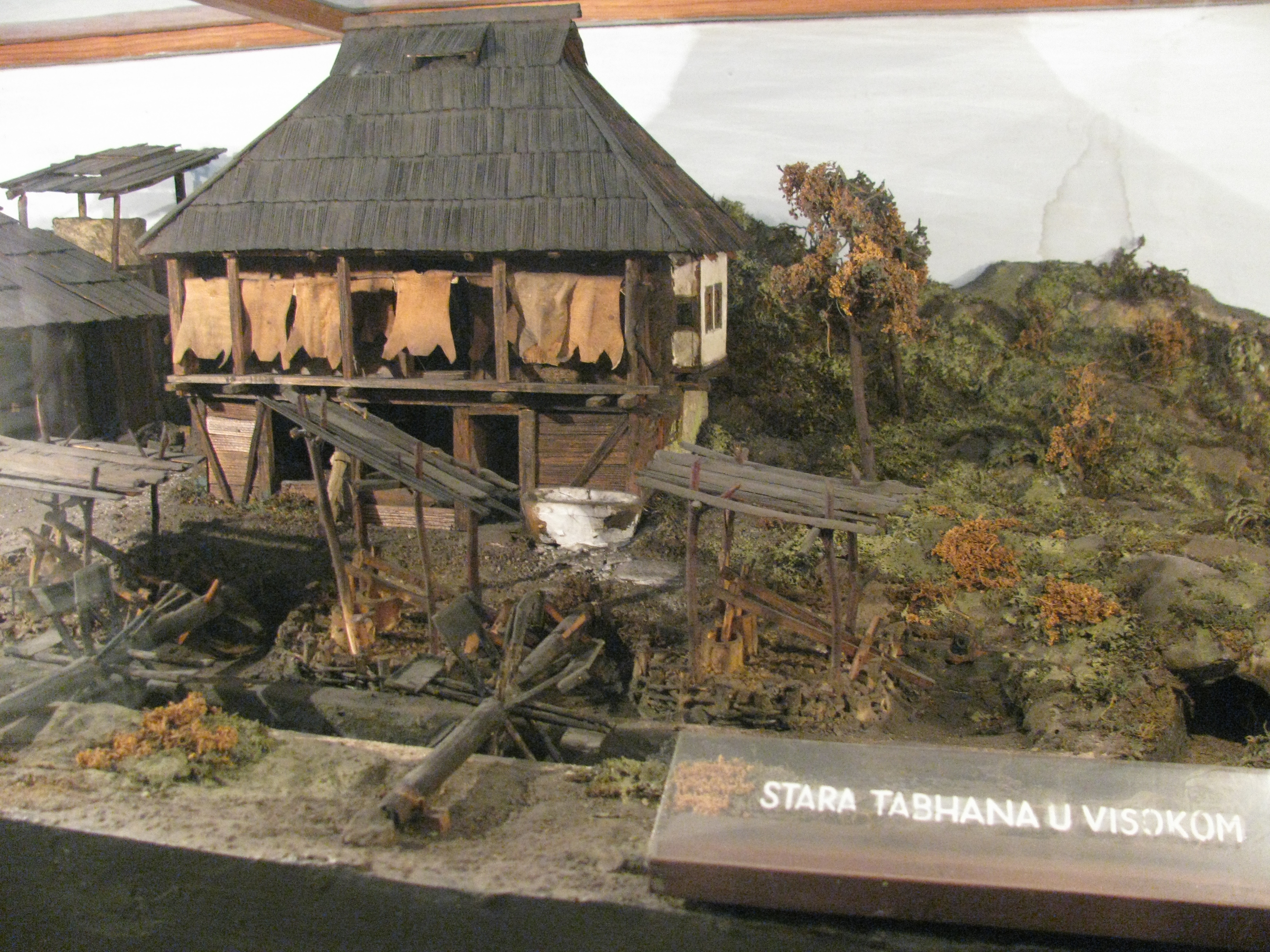
Visoko traditional Bosnian building for processing of leather

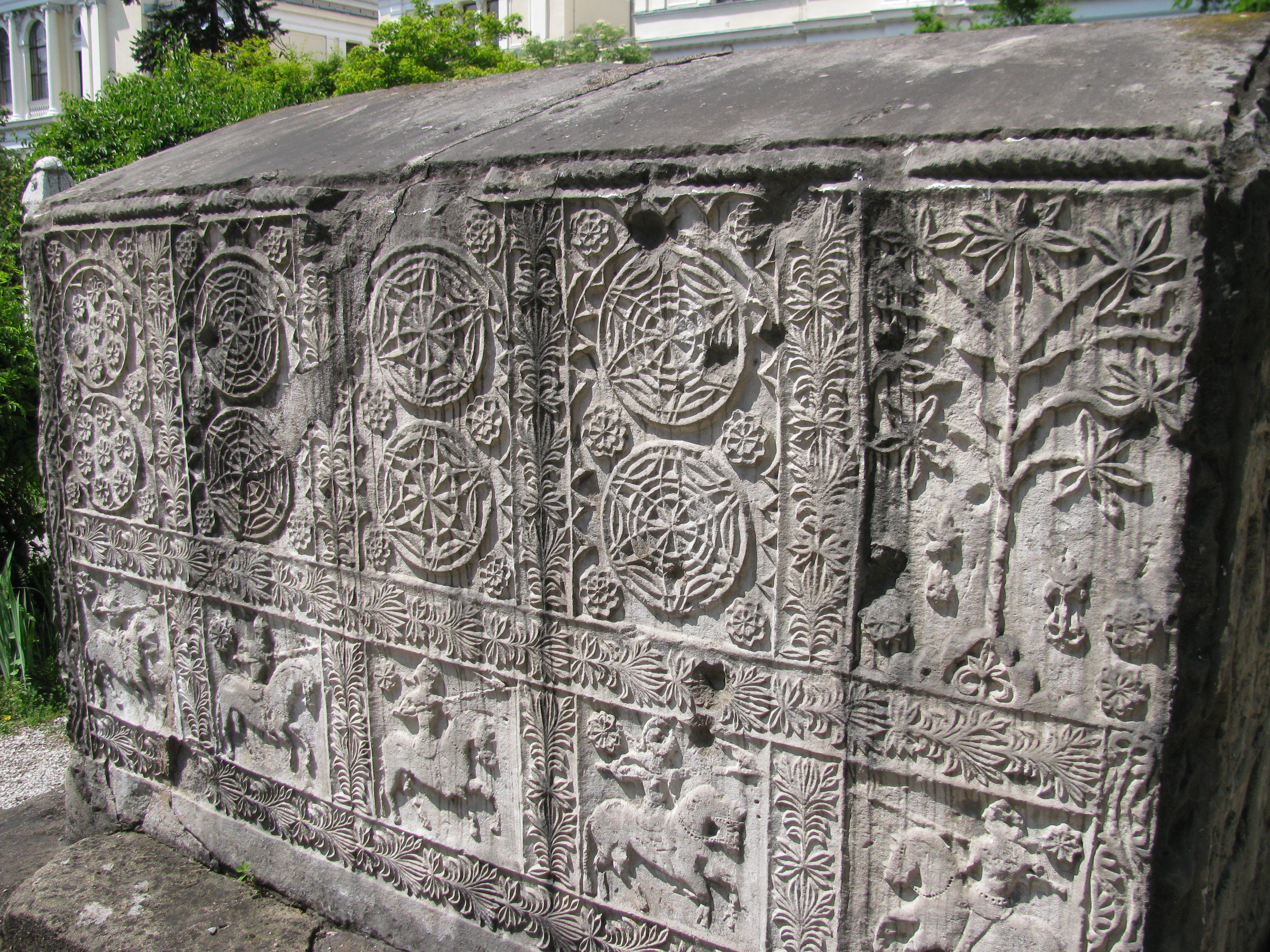
Stećak located at National Museum of Bosnia and Herzegovina

== See also ==
- National Library of Bosnia and Herzegovina
- List of museums in Bosnia and Herzegovina
- Movement “Science to Youth" – Alliance of Young Researchers of Bosnia and Herzegovina
