= Gazette of the National Museum of Bosnia and Herzegovina =

Glasnik Zemaljskog muzeja Bosne i Hercegovine
- Language: Bosnian/Croatian/Serbian and English

Publication details
- History: 1 Jan 1889–present
- Publisher: National Museum of Bosnia and Herzegovina (Bosnia and Herzegovina)
- Frequency: quarterly
- ISO 4: Find out here

Indexing
- ISSN: 0581-7501
- ISSN: 0581-751X
- ISSN: 0581-7528

Links
- Journal homepage

The Gazette of the National Museum of Bosnia and Herzegovina is the oldest scientific journal in Bosnia and Herzegovina. It is published by National Museum of Bosnia and Herzegovina with a seat in the capital of Sarajevo.

== History ==
After the establishment of the National Museum in Sarajevo, a scientific research institution in Bosnia and Herzegovina that took on the task of collecting, processing, studying and preserving valuable archaeological, ethnological and other finds, the need was soon identified to launch a scientific journal that would monitor fieldwork, and where prominent scientists from across the Austria-Hungary Monarchy would be able to publish the results of their research endeavors.

The initiative to launch a publication of this type was realized at the end of 1888, and the first issue of the Gazette of the National Museum was submitted for public inspection on 1 January 1889. Initially, the Gazette was published four times a year, and the first editor, from 1889 to 1906, was Kosta Hörmann.

Within the so-called "old series" of the Gazette (1889–1943), 55 volumes of the magazine were published in 134 volumes. The editorial board was headed by great names in Bosnian and Herzegovinian science and museology at the time, from the aforementioned Hörmann, through Ćiro Truhelka (1906 – 1921), Vladislav Skarić (1921/1922 – 1936), Mihovil Mandić (1936 – 1941), Jozo Petrović (1941 – 1942), to Vejsil Ćurčić (1943).

The second chapter in the history of the journal began after World War II, in 1946, when its "new series" began to be published. According to the scientific fields covered by the published articles and contributions, Gazette appeared in the following volumes: Social Sciences (1946–1953), History and Ethnography (1954–1957), Archaeology (1954 to 2006), Ethnology (1958 to 2006), and Natural Sciences (1945 to 2006).

The concept of the journal, outlined in the program published in the first issue, has remained to this day. The task of the Gazette of the National Museum of Bosnia and Herzegovina was and remains to bring original scientific and professional articles from all areas studied at the National Museum of Bosnia and Herzegovina, and to have both Museum employees and external collaborators participate in it with their contributions.

Since 2010, the Gazette has been changing its appearance: it is published in a larger format, and the papers in the volumes Archaeology and Ethnology are published in Bosnian/Croatian/Serbian and English, while the volume Natural Sciences is in English.
