= The Collected Shorter Novels of Tim Winton =

The Collected Shorter Novels of Tim Winton is a collection of early short novels by award-winning Australian author Tim Winton. Published in 1995, it includes An Open Swimmer, That Eye, The Sky and In the Winter Dark.

== Contents ==
The three novels had previously been published as stand alone novels., An Open Swimmer was published in 1982 and was the winner of the 1981 Australian Vogel National Literary Award. That Eye, The Sky was published in 1986 and In the Winter Dark published 1988.
