= Blueback =

Blueback may refer to any of a number of unrelated fish species with blue coloration:

- Blueback (novel), a 1997 novel by Australian author Tim Winton
- USS Blueback (SS-326), a US Navy submarine of the Balao-class
- USS Blueback (SS-581), a Barbel-class submarine and the last non-nuclear submarine to join the US Naval Fleet
- Beardslee trout or bluebacks
- Blueback, a juvenile hooded seal
- Blueback (film), an Australian drama
- Blueback chart - nautical map produced for merchant navy use

== See also ==
- Blueback herring or blueback shad
- Blueback salmon or sockeye salmon
