= In the Winter Dark (disambiguation) =

In the Winter Dark may refer to:

- In the Winter Dark, 1988 novel by Tim Winton
- In the Winter Dark (film), 1998 film adaptation of the novel
