= Breath (novel) =

2008 novel by Tim Winton

- First edition
- Author: Tim Winton
- Language: English
- Publisher: Hamish Hamilton, Australia
- Publication date: 2008
- Publication place: Australia
- Media type: Print (Hardback)
- Pages: 215
- ISBN: 978-0-241-01530-8
- OCLC: 225975281
- Preceded by: Dirt Music

Breath is the twentieth book and eighth novel by Australian author Tim Winton. His first novel in seven years, it was published in 2008, in Australia, New Zealand, the UK, the US, Canada, the Netherlands, and Germany.

== Plot summary ==
The novel is set in a small Western Australian logging village named Sawyer, near the fictional coastal town of Angelus, which has featured in several of Winton's works, including Shallows and The Turning. It is narrated by Bruce "Pikelet" Pike, a divorced, middle-aged paramedic, and takes the form of a long flashback in which he remembers childhood experiences of friendship with another boy, of surfing under the mentorship of an older surfing champion, and of repeated statutory rape by the older surfer's wife. The main events of the novel takes place in the 1970s.

Before the main events of the story take place, the opening chapter depicts a scene of two paramedics responding to an emergency call. The older paramedic, who is the narrator, immediately recognises that the boy that they have been called to help is dead as a result of hanging himself. The paramedic consoles the disconsolate mother who asks him how she will explain his death. After leaving, the younger paramedic says that it was the first suicide she had encountered, but the narrator says that it was not a suicide, without explaining that it had been an accident resulting from an autoerotic asphyxiation.

The story then shifts to the narrator's childhood. The narrator, Bruce "Pikelet" Pike, recounts his boyhood friendship with Ivan "Loonie" Loon. They first meet when eleven-year-old Pikelet stumbles across Loonie pretending to drown in a river in order to frighten a young family sitting nearby. The boys bond over their love for dangerous stunts, despite being the polar opposites of each other. They form a tight friendship and spend the majority of their time together. The two boys witness a group of young men surfing a gigantic wave and are inspired to pick up surfing as a hobby. They then meet a professional surfer named Bill "Sando" Sanderson, who encourages them to pursue this ambition and offers to teach them both how to surf. The trio bond quickly and the boys are constantly over at Sando's house, which is a treehouse in the middle of the Australian bush, shared by Sando's American wife Eva Sanderson.

After teaching them the basics, Sando quickly encourages the two now-teenage boys to attempt extremely dangerous stunts in the ocean, using their strong desire for his approval to drive a rivalry between them. At first, Pikelet has plenty of fun with the others, though he soon becomes tired of how Sando pits Loonie and himself against each other - and how the older man shows favouritism towards Loonie. The two boys' friendship sours when Loonie breaks a bone and is unable to join the others as they take on a very large wave, Old Smokey, which lies a mile from the shore, causing Loonie to become jealous of Pikelet and treat him with increasing hostility. Once his arm heals, the three take on an even more ambitious wave, Nautilus, which lies three miles offshore and breaks on an extremely shallow shoal. However, once out at sea, while Sando and Loonie both attempt the wave, Pikelet flatly refuses, seeing it as far too dangerous, which causes the other two to begin to see Pikelet as more cowardly. The rift between them is cemented when Sando invites Loonie on a trip to Bali with him, but purposely excludes Pikelet. This puts a heavy strain on Pikelet and Loonie's friendship.

While Sando and Loonie are away, Pikelet surfs Old Smokey by himself. He has one successful ride, which reinvigorates his battered self-confidence, but on the second attempt he falls and suffers multiple hold-downs from a series of waves, losing his board and having to swim home as a result. Sando, after returning to Australia, hears of Pikelet's actions and congratulates Pikelet. Loonie finds out too and asks Pikelet begrudgingly if it is true, and Pikelet confirms that it is. Pikelet then realises that their friendship is over and watches the now sixteen-year-old Loonie walk away without saying goodbye, not knowing that he would never see Loonie again.

Sando and Loonie depart again for a more extended trip, which takes them back to Indonesia, and then to various places around the Pacific. While the others are gone, Pikelet finds comfort in Eva, and discovers that she was an elite skier whose career came to an abrupt halt after she crippled one of her legs. Eva is psychologically tortured by watching her husband continue to do what he loves every day while she is forced to wither away. Eva eventually initiates a secretive, sexual relationship with Pikelet, who is underage. Their relationship evolves into Eva requesting Pikelet to asphyxiate her during sex. Pikelet eventually notices that Eva is pregnant. Pikelet asks if he is the father and Eva implies that he is not, though there is ambiguity in this response.

Sando eventually returns to Australia, but Loonie does not return with him. Sando tells Pikelet that Loonie abandoned him on the trip. Sando also tells Pikelet that he is going to be a father and that he and Eva are moving back to the United States to raise the baby. After an accident at work, Pikelet’s father passes away. At the same time of Pikelet’s father’s death, the baby is born and the Sandersons leave soon after. Years later, Pikelet finds out that Eva has died as a result of an autoerotic fatality. He also learns Loonie was murdered in a bar after a drug deal gone wrong.

Pikelet, now in his fifties, reflects on his experience with the Sandersons and Loonie. He notes that his bond with his mother was never recovered, his marriage had fallen apart and that he had himself committed to an asylum. The book ends with Pikelet claiming that surfing was the only activity he could do without any reason and that the sport was still dear to his heart even after all those years.

== Characters ==
- Bruce "Pikelet" Pike
- Ivan "Loonie" Loon
- Bill "Sando" Sanderson
- Eva Sanderson

== Themes ==
Reviewer Cathleen Schine describes Winton as "a writer who values themes, a practitioner of what might be called the school of Macho Romanticism, or perhaps better, Heroic Sensitivity". She writes that Winton's characters "tend to flirt with death, long for death, while at the same time bravely suffering physical hardship in order to escape death". In a somewhat similar vein, Aida Edemariam contrasts Winton to Hemingway, writing that in Winton "Land and sea are too implacable for such [ie Hemingway's] triumphalism, too capable of the sudden knock-out blow" and she goes on to say that "Winton's books are stalked by the possibility of the fatal undertow, on sea, on land, emotionally; by the knowledge of how fragile the strongest bodies, the bravest minds, can be".

It is a book about risk, about finding a balance between being extraordinary and ordinary. The imagery Winton uses to explore these concepts is that of "breathing and gasping for breath". The boys' friendship is established through their daring each other to hold their breath under water, but breath also appears in other forms in the novel: in Pikelet's father's snoring, in the loss of breath when being knocked over in the surf, in games that toy with asphyxiation, and in the resuscitation that is crucial to Pike's work as a paramedic. In Winton's conception, the very ordinary act of breathing can take on a grandeur when associated with "the ecstasy and brief transcendence vouchsafed to those who challenge seas".

Andrew Riemer, in his review, suggests than "Thomas Mann dealt with the same paradox, the same tragic dilemma of beauty and destruction, in Death in Venice, though from a very different perspective. Winton's book belongs, I think, to the same tradition, though in place of Mann's typically European immersion in high culture, Winton articulates his concerns in an almost unsullied Australian vernacular."

Canadian reviewer Ian McGillis, on the other hand, compares Winton with Ian McEwan, writing that "Breath shares with Ian McEwan's On Chesil Beach that sense of a good if compromised life lived in the aftermath of decisions made without adequate preparation." He writes "that the choices he [Bruce Pike] made in youth will follow him, for better or worse, to the grave" and that Winton does not offer any easy solutions but rather leaves "the reader to ponder the implications".

== Surfing ==
In an interview with Aida Edemariam, of The Guardian, Winton says about surfing:

"I can afford to blow the morning off and go for a surf. I think, 'oh god, I'm nearly 50, you know? If I can get another 10 or 15 years of surfing - that's fine. I've worked hard, I tell myself, as I'm throwing the board in the car. I owe it to myself. A bit of water over the gills. That's my reward. I'm happier. In the same way I did when I was a teenager. Going down to the sea in anguish and turmoil and bewilderment, pubescent eruption, then coming home blissed out and happy. At one with the world."

== Literary significance and reception ==
Breath featured as the Book at Bedtime on BBC Radio 4 from 23 June to 4 July 2008.

The Publishers Weekly Signature review by David Maine praises Breath: "This slender book packs an emotional wallop."

== Film adaptation ==
Filming of Breath began in April 2016. Australian actor and The Mentalist star Simon Baker directed the production, producer Mark Johnson having teamed to acquire feature rights to the novel. Baker also starred in the movie, which was released in 2017.

== Awards and nominations ==
- 2008 Age Book of the Year, Fiction – winner
- 2008 Indie Book Awards Book of the Year – Fiction – winner
- 2009 Miles Franklin Award – winner
- 2009 Commonwealth Writers' Prize, South East Asia and the South Pacific Region – shortlisted
- 2009 New South Wales NSW Premier's Literary Awards, Christina Stead Prize – shortlisted
