= Cloudstreet =

Novel by Tim Winton

- First edition
- Author: Tim Winton
- Language: English
- Publisher: McPhee Gribble
- Publication date: May 1991
- Publication place: Australia
- Media type: Print (Hardback & Paperback)
- Pages: 426 pp
- ISBN: 0-14-027398-0
- OCLC: 220869584
- Preceded by: In the Winter Dark
- Followed by: The Riders

Cloudstreet is a novel by Australian writer Tim Winton published in 1991. It chronicles the lives of two working-class families, the Pickles and the Lambs, who come to live together in a large house called Cloudstreet in Perth, Western Australia, over a period of twenty years, 1943 to 1963. The novel received several awards, including a Miles Franklin Award in 1992, and has been adapted into various forms, including a stage play and a television miniseries.

In 2022, the novel was included on the "Big Jubilee Read" list of 70 books by Commonwealth authors, selected to celebrate the Platinum Jubilee of Elizabeth II, and in 2026, was listed #1 in ABC Radio National's countdown of the top 100 Australian Books.

== Plot summary ==
In 1943, precipitated by separate personal tragedies, two poor families, the Lambs and the Pickles, flee their rural homes to share a large house called Cloudstreet in Perth, Western Australia. The Pickles include the father, Sam, the mother, Dolly, and their three children, Ted, Rose, and Chub. The Lambs are led by father, Lester, and mother, Oriel, and they have six children, Hattie, Elaine, Mason (nicknamed "Quick"), Samson (nicknamed “Fish”), Red and Lon. The Pickles own Cloudstreet, but rent half of the house to the Lambs, who open a grocery store on the ground floor of the house. The two families contrast each other; the devoutly religious Lambs find meaning in hard work and God's grace, while the Pickles hope for good luck and do not share the Lambs' appetite for hard work. The novel focuses on the experiences and relationships of these two families over a period of 20 years.

== Major themes ==
The novel is a celebration of community and people's search for connection with family, the past, and the environment in which they live. The novel also explores several Australian cultural myths, including the idealisation of the Aussie battler, the heroic figure of the ANZAC, rural and suburban identity, and the idea of Australia as "the lucky country". Peter Garrett also noted the importance of landscapes in the book: "he writes about the physicality of our landscapes and whether it's sort of, you know, railway cuttings, or bits of the desert, or the coast, or the estuaries where they go fishing occasionally, and he casts that landscape across the top of the lives that people are leading and their emotional landscapes are sort of contrasting against the landscapes of things they're doing at different times".

== Historical context ==
Cloudstreet is framed by many key events in world history, including World War II, the Korean War and the assassination of John F. Kennedy. Winton depicts Australia at this time as, for the most part, comfortable and conservative, characterised by backyard barbecues, by wives – who were no longer needed for the war effort – consigned to the home, and by the growth of the Australian dream. World events influence the Lambs and Pickles, but distantly, like an echo that sends ripples across the surface of their lives. The novel focuses on the domestic, and this serves as the filter through which history is measured. The most prominent historical character within Cloudstreet is the "Nedlands monster", whose real name is Eric Edgar Cooke, a serial killer. The Australian Dictionary of Biography writes that Winton's novel Cloudstreet embodied the social impact of Cooke's crimes, which saw a change in personal and household security and a loss of a relaxed style of living.

== Critical reception ==
The novel has received positive reviews. Australian writer Marion Halligan praised Winton's prose, deeming it "full of energy, vitality, [and] wit". Writer Mem Fox stated "If you have not read Cloudstreet, your life is diminished . . . if you have not met these characters, this generous community, these tragedies, the humour. It is so wonderful." In his introduction to the 2013 Folio Society edition, Australian writer Alex Miller calls it "Australia's most iconic novel" and "one of the greatest acts of the human imagination of the late twentieth century".

== Awards and recognition ==
Cloudstreet was the recipient of the National Book Council Banjo Award for Fiction, the Western Australian Fiction Award and the Deo Gloria Award in 1991, and a Miles Franklin Award in 1992. In 2003, members of the Australian Society of Authors (ASA) voted Cloudstreet as their favourite Australian novel. The same year, Cloudstreet came out on top in a readers' poll organised by the ASA and ABC Radio National. Cloudstreet was the "overwhelming favourite" in the 2010 "ABR Favourite Australian Novel" poll conducted by the Australian Book Review, and in 2012, viewers of First Tuesday Book Club voted Cloudstreet #1 on a list of "10 Aussie Books You Must Read Before You Die". On 5 November 2019, BBC News listed Cloudstreet on its list of the 100 most inspiring novels.

== Adaptations ==
Cloudstreet has been adapted into various forms:

- Paige Gibbs adapted the book into a radio play in 1996 for ABC Radio National.
- In 1998, the novel was adapted into a stage play by Nick Enright and Justin Monjo, which opened in Sydney in January 1998 under the direction of Neil Armfield, produced by Company B and Black Swan Theatre for the Sydney Festival, and published by Currency Press. The play won several awards, including an AWGIE Award in 1999, and the Helpmann Award for Best Play and Helpmann Award for Best Direction of a Play in 2002. The joint production also ran in a limited season at Theatre Royal Sydney in June and July 2001.
- In 2019 and 2020, the play was revived in a Black Swan State Theatre Company and Malthouse Theatre co-production under the direction of Matthew Lutton, staged from February 21 to March 15, 2020 at His Majesty's Theatre as a part of Perth Festival.
- A three-part television miniseries was made for the Showcase subscription television channel, which first screened from 22 May 2011.
- In May 2016, an operatic version with music by George Palmer was premiered in Adelaide by the State Opera of South Australia.
- In June 2023 a three part radio version was broadcast on BBC Radio 4.
