= Blood and Water (short story collection) =

Short story collection by Tim Winton

- First edition (publ. Picador)
- Author: Tim Winton
- Language: English
- Genre: Short story collection
- Publisher: Picador
- Publication date: 1993
- Publication place: Australia
- Media type: Print
- Pages: 266 pp.
- ISBN: 033032554X

Blood and Water is a 1993 short story collection by Australian author Tim Winton. Its contents are drawn from the previous two short story collections, Scission and Other Stories and Minimum Of Two, as well as some previously uncollected stories.

== Critical reception ==
According to Peter Kemp, writing for The Times Literary Supplement, "Tim Winton shows himself, in this collection of his briefer pieces, painfully live to all the ways that people can be damaged (and not only people)...The book's chief focus, though, is on youngish and fairly recently married couples, usually short of money, in poor jobs or in no jobs at all...Towards these characters and the adjustments, crises and estrangements they face, Winton brings a tough sensitivity reminiscent of Raymond Carver or Andre Dubus. Sharp with crisp and solid detail, his stories – quick encapsulatings of aspects of life – resemble snapshots."
