= The Turning (2013 film) =

- Theatrical release poster
- Directed by: The Turning Ensemble
- Screenplay by: The Turning Ensemble
- Based on: The Turning by Tim Winton
- Produced by: Robert Connolly; Maggie Miles; The Turning Ensemble
- Starring: Cate Blanchett; Rose Byrne; Hugo Weaving; Miranda Otto
- Cinematography: The Turning Ensemble
- Edited by: The Turning Ensemble
- Music by: The Turning Ensemble
- Production companies: Level K Arenamedia; Media Super; Australian Broadcasting Corporation
- Distributed by: Madman Entertainment
- Release dates: 3 August 2013 (Melbourne International Film Festival); 26 September 2014
- Running time: 180 minutes
- Country: Australia
- Language: English

The Turning is a 2013 Australian anthology drama film based on a 2004 collection of short stories by Tim Winton. Produced by Robert Connolly and Maggie Miles, the film starred Cate Blanchett, Rose Byrne, Hugo Weaving, and Miranda Otto. It premiered at the Melbourne International Film Festival on 3 August 2013. It received a nomination for the Asia Pacific Screen Award for Best Feature Film, as well as many nominations for AACTA Awards, including a Best Actress win for Rose Byrne.

== Synopsis ==
The film consists of seventeen chapters, which are linked and overlap each other. An eighteenth component is provided by the epigraph. The same characters appear in several of the chapters which revolve around turning points in their lives and changes in their relationships.

== Cast ==
- Cate Blanchett as Gail Lang ("Reunion")
- Libby Tanner as Gail Lang ("Damaged Goods")
- Hugo Weaving as Bob Lang ("Commission")
- Miranda Otto as Sherry ("The Turning")
- Rose Byrne as Rae ("The Turning")
- Mirrah Foulkes as Fay Keenan ("Small Mercies")
- Harrison Gilbertson as Vic Lang ("On Her Knees")
- Callan Mulvey as David Wilson ("Aquifer")
- Myles Pollard as Dan ("The Turning")
- Susie Porter as Carol Lang ("On Her Knees")
- Matt Nable as Max ("The Turning")
- Meyne Wyatt as Frank Leaper ("Family")
- Daniel Wyllie as Vic Lang ("Defender")

== Directors & Writers ==
The film had 18 directors, including Mia Wasikowska, David Wenham, and Stephen Page, who made their directorial debuts, as well as Justin Kurzel and Warwick Thornton. Other directors were: Jonathan auf der Heide, Tony Ayres, Jub Clerc, Shaun Gladwell, Rhys Graham, Yaron Lifschitz, Anthony Lucas, Claire McCarthy, Ian Meadows, Ashlee Page, Simon Stone, Anthony Lucas and Marieka Walsh (epigraph).

Initially, Cate Blanchett intended to direct before switching to an acting role, with Simon Stone taking her place. Many of the directors were also involved in screenwriting, along with additional writers Andrew Upton, Marcel Dorney, Justin Monjo, Emily Ballou, Circa Contemporary Circus, and Kris Mrksa.

== Production ==
The anthology was produced by Robert Connolly and Maggie Miles, with individual chapters produced by Donna Chang, Kath Shelper (produced 2 chapters), Liz Kearney, Maggie Miles (produced 5 chapters), Tenille Kennedy, Anthony Lucas, Phillipa Campey, Sonya Humphrey, Julie Eckersley, Sue Italiano, John Harvey, Katherine Slattery, Jo Dyer, Sarah Shaw, Anna McLeish, Ben Knapton, Alex Barnes, and Rita Walsh.

== Chapter Titles ==
Although the order of the chapters was not necessarily going to follow the order of the book when the anthology was envisaged, that was the final order for the film, the chapters are: Epigraph - Ash Wednesday, Big World, Abbreviation, Aquifer, Damaged Goods, Small Mercies, Film Camp, On Her Knees, Cockleshell, The Turning, Sand, Family, Long, Clear View, Reunion, Commission, Fog, Boner McPharlin's Moll, Immunity and Defender.

== Release ==
The Turning premiered at the Melbourne International Film Festival on 3 August 2013. It was screened in the Berlinale Special Galas section of the 64th Berlin International Film Festival in February 2014.

The film was cut down and rearranged for broadcast on ABC1, debuting on 23 February 2014. Running for approximately 90 minutes (as opposed to the 180-minute theatrical cut), with eight of the original 17 stories included: "Reunion", "Aquifer", "On Her Knees", "The Turning", "Long, Clear View", "Commission", "Cockleshell", and "Sand". The remaining nine stories were made available online as multi-platform ABC iView content. The producers also created a special Western Australian version to screen at CinefestOz, titled Abbreviation, it contained all of the WA produced chapters.

== Reception ==
On the review aggregator website Rotten Tomatoes, 86% of 28 critics' reviews are positive, with an average rating of 6.6/10. The website's consensus reads: "Australia at its most sublime, The Turning blends top-tier talent with great views and winding narrative roads."

English critic Peter Bradshaw reviewed the cut down version, which was released in the UK in 2015. He only awarded the film 2 stars out of 5 in 2015, finding that collection did not quite "come together". He praised the final three stories in that version: "Long, Clear View" by Mia Wasikowska; "Boner McPharlin’s Moll" by Justin Kurzel; and "Big World" by Warwick Thornton.

== Accolades ==
Award	Category	Recipient	Result
AACTA Awards	Best Film	Robert Connolly	Nominated
AACTA Awards	Best Film	Maggie Miles	Nominated
AACTA Awards	Best Film	The Turning Ensemble	Nominated
AACTA Awards	Best Direction	The Turning Ensemble	Nominated
AACTA Awards	Best Adapted Screenplay	The Turning Ensemble	Nominated
AACTA Awards	Best Actor	Hugo Weaving	Nominated
AACTA Awards	Best Actress	Rose Byrne	Won
AACTA Awards	Best Supporting Actress	Mirrah Foulkes	Nominated
AACTA Awards	Best Editing	The Turning Ensemble	Nominated
Asia Pacific Screen Awards	Best Film	Robert Connolly, Maggie Miles	Nominated
