= The Riders (film) =

Upcoming drama film by Edward Berger

- Directed by: Edward Berger
- Screenplay by: David Kajganich
- Based on: The Riders by Tim Winton
- Produced by: Brad Pitt; Dede Gardner; David Kajganich; Jeremy Kleiner; Edward Berger; Ridley Scott; Michael Pruss
- Starring: Brad Pitt; Julianne Nicholson; Coco Greenstone; Rosie Anne O'Gorman; Michael Smiley; Danny Huston; Camille Cottin; Ulrich Thomsen
- Cinematography: Florian Hoffmeister
- Production companies: Plan B Entertainment; Scott Free Productions; Nine Hours; Bulletproof Cupid; Big Fish
- Distributed by: A24
- Countries: United States; United Kingdom; Ireland; Belgium; Germany
- Language: English

The Riders is an upcoming psychological thriller film directed by Edward Berger. It is based on the 1994 novel by Tim Winton, being produced by Brad Pitt under his production company Plan B Entertainment. The film stars Pitt, Julianne Nicholson, Coco Greenstone, Michael Smiley, Danny Huston, Camille Cottin, Rosie Anne O'Gorman and Ulrich Thomsen.

== Premise ==
Fred Scully is a family man who has bought a farm house in Ireland and is renovating it while his wife Jennifer and 7-year-old daughter Billie are on a trip to their homeland in Australia. After his wife disappears during the trip, Fred is left with his traumatized 7-year-old daughter and must travel across Europe searching for answers.

== Cast ==
- Brad Pitt as Fred Scully
- Julianne Nicholson as Jennifer Scully
- Coco Greenstone as Billie Scully
- Rosie Anne O'Gorman as Billie Scully #2
- Michael Smiley
- Danny Huston
- Camille Cottin
- Ulrich Thomsen
- Lara Pulver
- Kimonas Kouris

== Production ==
=== Development ===
The rights to Tim Winton's novel The Riders were secured by Susie Brooks-Smith in 2000. In 2004, Robert Fox signed on as producer. It was announced in 2012 that Sam Worthington was cast in the lead role, with Timothy Spall and Charles Dance in supporting roles. Brooks-Smith had adapted the screenplay with Michael Hirst and Francesca Brill, and Robert Connolly would direct. It was later revealed that filming would soon begin in February 2013 in Korčula and Budapest, with a planned release date for February 2014, but the project did not proceed. In February 2014, Hans Fabian Wullenweber was announced to replace Connolly as director, and Ronan Keating, Luke Hemsworth, and Mark Strong were all added to the cast, with Spall being the only original actor reported. Filming was set to begin in Dublin later that year. However, just a couple of months later, Jahmil X.T. Qubeka was announced as the new director, and an entirely new cast consisting of Liam McIntyre, Pixie Davies, and Richard E. Grant were all set to appear. The film went into development hell for several years.

In 2018, it was reported that David Kajganich would adapt the novel and brought the film rights to Ridley Scott to produce through his Scott Free Productions company. In April 2025, Brad Pitt signed on to star with Edward Berger directing from a screenplay by Kajganich. A24 would finance and distribute the film, with shooting commencing in early 2026. In January 2026, Julianne Nicholson Coco Greenstone and Rosie Anne O'Gorman joined the cast. In February 2026, Michael Smiley, Danny Huston, Camille Cottin and Ulrich Thomsen joined the cast. Lara Pulver and Kimonas Kouris were added to the cast a month later.

=== Filming ===
Principal photography began on February 2, 2026 in Ireland. The shooting will span several locations across the country, including areas around Dublin, Wicklow, Cork, Kerry, and Laois. The film is also set to continue shooting across mainland Europe, with confirmed sequences planned on the Greek island of Hydra. In March, production moved to the canals of Amsterdam in the Netherlands, followed by several locations in Belgium, including Brussels and Heverlee. Further filming took place on the heritage railway between Puurs and Dendermonde.
