= Eyrie (novel) =

Book by Tim Winton

- First edition
- Author: Tim Winton
- Language: English
- Genre: Novel
- Publisher: Hamish Hamilton, Australia
- Publication date: 2013
- Publication place: Australia
- Media type: Print (hardback & paperback)
- Pages: 432
- ISBN: 978-0374151348
- Preceded by: Breath

Eyrie (2013) is a novel by Australian author Tim Winton. It was shortlisted for the 2014 Miles Franklin Literary Award.

== Plot summary ==
Tom Keely is alone, living at the top of the Mirador apartments, a highrise in Fremantle, Western Australia. Once a high-powered environmental activist, he is now divorced and destitute. "Tim Winton's heart-stopping, exhilarating Eyrie asks how, in an impossibly compromised world, we can ever hope to do the right thing."

== Reviews ==
Lyn McCredden in the Sydney Review of Books wrote about Winton's theme of families who "...can be sustaining, even redemptive. They work on intimate premises different to those of the political and social. They can be bulwarks against a hostile world and places of repetitive, formative violence and loss. ..can be units of resistance against personal dissolution, even in the face of utter loss and falls from grace, but they also carry the seeds of tragedy and hostility."

Michael Williams in The Guardian considered it a "superb novel", a tale about people "trying to work out how to be good to one another" He writes that while some critics have written about the bleakness of Eyrie they could also write about "... the narrative is as propulsive as anything he has written before—or applaud the novel's caustic and frequently laugh-out-loud sense of humour."

== Awards and nominations ==
- 2014 winner Western Australian Premier's Book Awards – People's Choice Award
- 2014 shortlisted Victorian Premier's Literary Awards – Fiction
- 2014 shortlisted Indie Awards – Fiction
- 2014 shortlisted Miles Franklin Literary Award
- 2014 shortlisted Australian Book Industry Awards (ABIA) – Australian Literary Fiction Book of the Year
- 2014 shortlisted Western Australian Premier's Book Awards – Fiction
- 2014 shortlisted Voss Literary Prize
- 2014 shortlisted Queensland Literary Awards – Fiction Book Award
