= Shaun Gladwell =

Australian contemporary artist (born 1972)

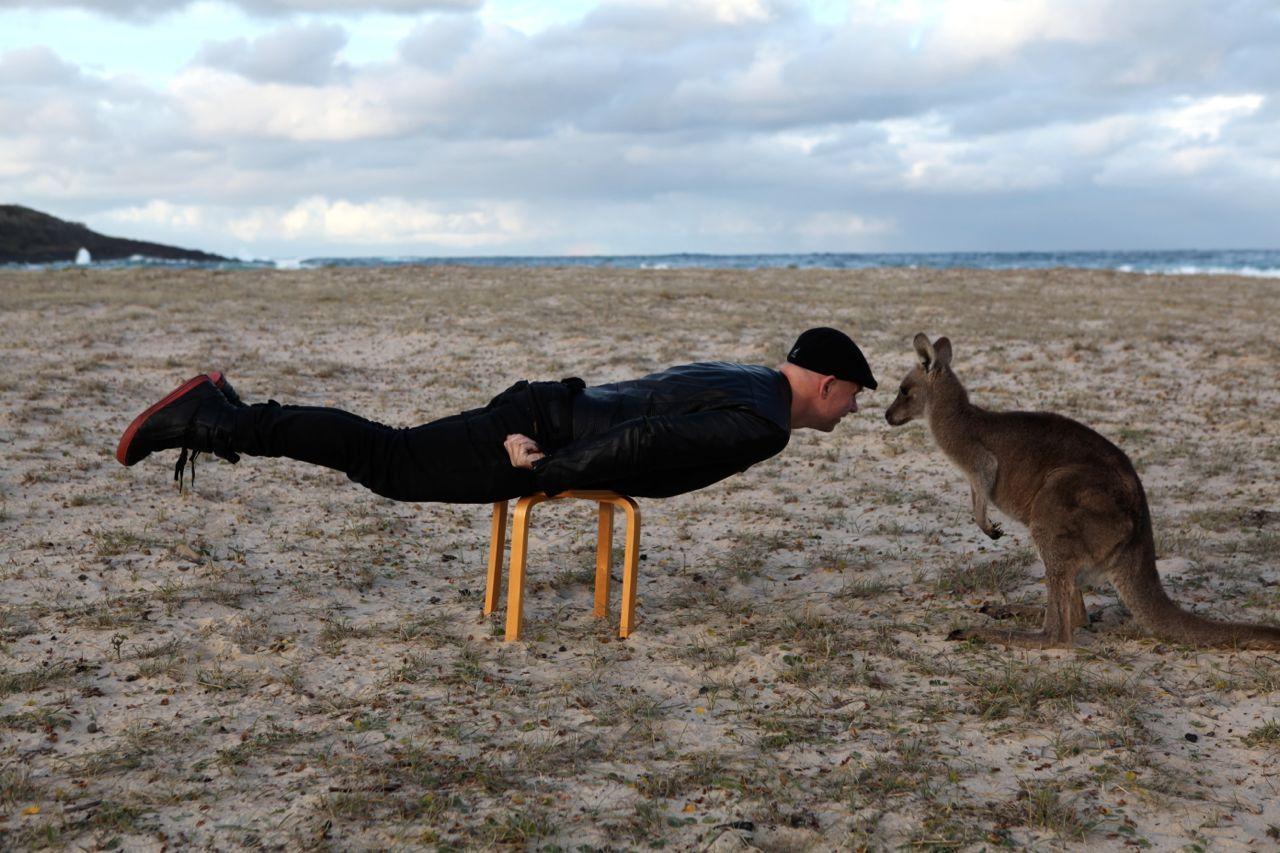
- Gladwell planking with a Kangaroo
- Born: 1972 (age 53–54); Sydney, Australia
- Education: Sydney College of the Arts, UNSW College of Fine Arts, Goldsmiths, University of London
- Known for: Video art, sculpture, photography, painting
- Notable work: Storm Sequence, The Turning (film)
- Movement: Multimedia art
- Patrons: Elton John

Shaun Gladwell (born 1972) is an Australian contemporary artist whose work spans moving image, painting, photography, sculpture, installation, performance and virtual reality.

== Early life ==
Gladwell was born in Sydney in 1972 and graduated from Sydney University's Sydney College of the Arts. He subsequently gained a master's degree from the University of New South Wales' College of Fine Arts and undertook further studies as an associate researcher at Goldsmiths, University of London (2001–2002) on a Samstag Scholarship from the University of South Australia. Initially, the artist studied painting but explored video and other mediums as a postgraduate student. In the late 1990s, Gladwell was a member of the Sydney-based art collective, Imperial Slacks.

== Work ==
=== 2000–2013 ===
Gladwell's video work from 2000 until 2013 saw the artist attempt to systematically catalogue many of the 'movement cultures' that were emerging and evolving within his generation. In interviews, Gladwell has described his interest in forms of Street dance, extreme sport, and skateboarding.

=== Maddestmaximvs 2009 ===
From 2007 until 2009 the artist applied many of his ideas concerning performance, gesture and the transformation of urban space to natural environments. During this period, Gladwell spent extended amounts of time in the Australian desert, producing his iconic series of works titled Maddestmaximus (2009). The series included video of Gladwell car surfing (Interceptor Surf Sequence) and ritualistically burying roadkill kangaroos (Apologies 1–6).

=== Official Australian war artist 2009–2010 ===
In late 2009, Gladwell was the Australian War Memorial's Australian official war artists in Afghanistan. This commissioning program began in World War I with Gladwell being the first video/new media artist in the history of the scheme. Gladwell has stated that during this commission he became both reliant upon and extremely critical of military technology within the theatre of war. A key work Gladwell made during his time in Southern Afghanistan is titled Double Field/Viewfinder (Tarin Kowt), 2009–2010.

The artist's work from this commission has been documented and analysed in the book Double War by Kit Messham-Muir, published by Thames and Hudson, 2015.

=== Skateboarders VS Minimalism 2016 ===
In January 2016, Gladwell presented a new video work titled Skateboarders VS Minimalism. The project was commissioned for the 40th Anniversary of the Sydney Festival and illustrates the artist's interest in juxtaposing popular sports culture with art history and museum culture. The video features skateboarders (including professional Rodney Mullen) riding on exact replicas of well known minimalist artworks. The soundtrack for this video features the music of Philip Glass.

=== Shaun Gladwell: Pacific Undertow ===
In mid to late 2019, Gladwell exhibited at the Museum of Contemporary Art, Sydney with Pacific Undertow. Pacific Undertow was the largest survey exhibition to date of the work of Australian artist Shaun Gladwell, best known for his videos representing the body in motion. The exhibition title, Pacific Undertow, is taken from a pivotal video piece. It resonates with a sense of elemental forces, motion and the heft of gravity: key principles that inform Gladwell's work.

=== Julian Assange ===
Gladwell's portrait of Julian Assange was a finalist for the 2024 Archibald Prize. The Archibald requires the artist to have one "live sitting" with the subject, which was difficult because Assange was incarcerated in Belmarsh Prison fighting extradition to the US. Due to the oppressive restrictions at Belmarsh, which prevented Gladwell from taking paper or pen into his visit to Assange, Gladwell sketched Assange with chocolate on a twenty-five pound banknote.

== Extended reality ==
In 2016, Gladwell co-founded BADFAITH, an independent virtual reality content collective that has since concluded as a project. Members of BADFAITH included artists, film directors, and a scientist involved in VR and AR research. BADFAITH was dubbed a VR pioneer by Vice.

In interviews, Gladwell stated BADFAITH as a direct reference to the concept proposed by Jean Paul Sartre and Simone de Belvouire. Gladwell produced several VR experiences through the BADFAITH network including the 6 minute animation Orbital Vanitas. Orbital Vanitas premiered at Sundance's 2017 New Frontiers.

In 2017, Orbital Vanitas was also shown at Cannes film festival and the Sydney Film festival amongst others. Orbital Vanitas was also selected for distribution via the New York Times op docs VR distribution platform NYTVR. Under the BADFAITH moniker, Gladwell co-curated the 2017 Sydney Film Festivals VR program.

Beyond BADFAITH, in 2016 Gladwell was the first documented artist to sell a virtual reality artwork on the Australian market. His XR works have been exhibited in leading museums including the National Gallery of Australia, Canberra; Museum of Contemporary Art Australia, Sydney; and in 2023 the National Gallery of Victoria, Melbourne inaugurated the globally acclaimed Passing Electrical Storms.

== Opera ==
Gladwell was commissioned by the 2013 Gergiev Festival to produce video art for a concert version of Richard Wagner's The Flying Dutchman. The opera was performed by the Rotterdam Philharmonic Orchestra, conducted by Yannick Nézet-Séguin on Sunday 15 September 2013 at De Doelen, Rotterdam. Gladwell interpreted Richard Wagner's opera as an Australian surf film by replacing all sailing references in the libretto with ones involving surfing. Regarding this work, Gladwell has stated that he was inspired by the seminal Australian surf film Morning of the Earth (1971). The video used a cast of performers that were both professional dancers and surfers.

== Performance and choreography ==
Gladwell has presented several live performances and choreographies since 2011. Gladwell's performance piece Reversed Readymade (2014) features a professional BMX bicycle rider performing stunts on Marcel Duchamp's Bicycle Wheel (1913). The work premiered at the inaugural Per4m program at Artissima 21, Turin, Italy, in November 2014. Initially, the piece was performed by professional Welsh BMX rider, Matti Hemmings, however subsequent performances in Australia have been enacted by Simon O'Brien.

== Film ==
In 2012, Gladwell directed a chapter titled "Family" for the feature film The Turning (2013). The anthology film is based on a collection of short stories by Australian author, Tim Winton. Gladwell cast Meyne Wyatt and Wayne Blair into the roles of two brothers in dispute. The Turning premiered at the Melbourne International Film Festival on 3 August 2013.

== Writing ==
In 2015, Gladwell published an artist book titled PATAFUNCTIONS in association with his solo exhibition titled The Lacrima Chair at the Sherman Contemporary Art Foundation. Gladwell describes the book as "fictional theory" and "simulated theory." The text features contributions from Denise Thwaites, Paul Patton and Kit Messham-Muir. PATAFUNCTIONS offers an exegesis on Gladwell's art practice and his wider thinking on issues of function and transformation. The cover design for PATAFUNCTIONS is an exact graphic appropriation of the Semiotext(e) Foreign Agents Series design by Jim Fleming from the 1980s.

== Criticism ==
Gladwell's entire artistic career has been questioned by a number of critics, particularly within Australia. Negative criticism was surveyed in a 2015 feature article in The Australian newspaper by Ashleigh Wilson:

Official war artist. Australia's representative in Venice. A prominent spot at the Royal Academy. A distinct theme has been emerging in recent times with Gladwell's career. But if this skateboarder turned artist has become something of an establishment figure, he's managed to do it without the assistance of Australian art critics. This newspaper's Christopher Allen has described him as overrated, while his counterpart at The Sydney Morning Herald, John McDonald, wrote a piece recently that questioned his appeal: "Watching the inexorable rise of Shaun Gladwell during the past decade makes me feel like the only teetotaller at a drunken party."

The art critic most vocally against Gladwell's work is John McDonald who identifies the work as 'hype'. In doing so, McDonald calls into question the Australian art institutions that support Gladwell:

If measured solely in terms of his representation in public collections, his international exhibitions and institutional honours, Gladwell is certainly "significant", but one would have to be very trusting in our institutions to believe that the most rewarded artists are necessarily the best.

== Exhibitions ==
Gladwell has been exhibiting extensively throughout Australia, Asia, the United States and Europe since 2001. He has participated in many international biennales and triennales, including: the Yokohama Triennale (2005); Busan Biennale and Bienal de São Paulo (both 2006); La Biennale di Venezia (2007 & 2009); the Biennale of Sydney, Taipei Biennial and Biennale Cuvée, Linz (all 2008); Cairo Biennial (2010); the Shanghai Biennale, China (2012); The California-Pacific Triennial and SCAPE 7, Public Art Christchurch Biennial, New Zealand (both 2013); as well as la Biennale d’Arte Contemporain, Douai (2015). In 2009, Gladwell was Australia's representative at the 53rd Venice Biennale.

=== Elton John ===
Gladwell's photographs, lightboxes and videos have been collected by Elton John, particularly work relating to human interaction with other species and the natural world.

== Skateboarding ==
Whilst skateboarding frequently features in Gladwell's artworks, he himself competed in freestyle skateboarding competitions throughout the late 1980s. He occasionally competes in freestyle skateboarding events such as the 2011 Malmo Super Bowl in Sweden and the 2012 World Roundup in Cloverdale Canada. For the 2013 SCAPE 7 public art triennale in Christchurch, New Zealand, Gladwell designed skate-able sculptures that reflected the fractured urban landscape post 2011 Christchurch earthquake. For the 2016 Perth International Arts Festival, Gladwell was in a public conversation with legendary freestyle skateboarder Russ Howell.

=== Environmentalism ===
The artist has described himself as "environmentally concerned", presenting his ideas on art and the environment at ARTCOP 21 in Paris (2015), having been a finalist in the COAL Prize for Art and Environment that same year.

Gladwell lives and works in Melbourne, Australia.

== Literature ==
- Shaun Gladwell: Pacific Undertow (2019). Published by the Museum of Contemporary Art Australia. ISBN 9781925806021
- Shaun Gladwell: The Lacrima Chair (2015). Published by the Sherman Contemporary Art Foundation. ISBN 9780987490933
- Double War: Shaun Gladwell, Visual Culture and the Wars in Afghanistan and Iraq Kit Messham-Muir (2015). Published by Thames & Hudson ISBN 9780500500545
- Patafunctions (2015). Published by the Sherman Contemporary Art Foundation. ISBN 9780987490971
- Cycles of Radical Will (2013) Essay by Richard Grayson. Published by the De La Warr Pavilion, U.K. ISBN 9780956286635
- Point of View: Afghanistan (2013) Published by the Australian War Memorial ISBN 9781921353154
- Perpetual 360 Degree Sessions (2011) Published by Schunck, The Netherlands. ISBN 9789490624002
- Shaun Gladwell MATRIX 162 (2011) Published by the Wadsworth Atheneum of Art, Hartford, Connecticut.
- Stereo Sequences (2011), Published by Schwartz City & The Australian Centre for the Moving Image. ISBN 9780646530017
- Interceptor Intersection (2010) Published by Schwartz City and Cambelltown Art Center. ISBN 9781875199754
- Maddestmaximus: Planet and Stars Sequence (2009) Published by Schwartz City/ Australia Council for the Arts. ISBN 9781863954419
- Shaun Gladwell Videoworks (2008) Published by Artspace, Sydney. ISBN 9781920781347
- Untitled. Portraits of Australian Artists (2007) by Sonia Payes, Published by Macmillan Art Publishing ISBN 9781876832285
- Practices of the City and the Kickflipping Flaneur (2000) Kit Messham-Muir. Published by Artspace, Sydney. ISBN 1876017732
