= Simon Baker =

Australian actor and director (born 1969)

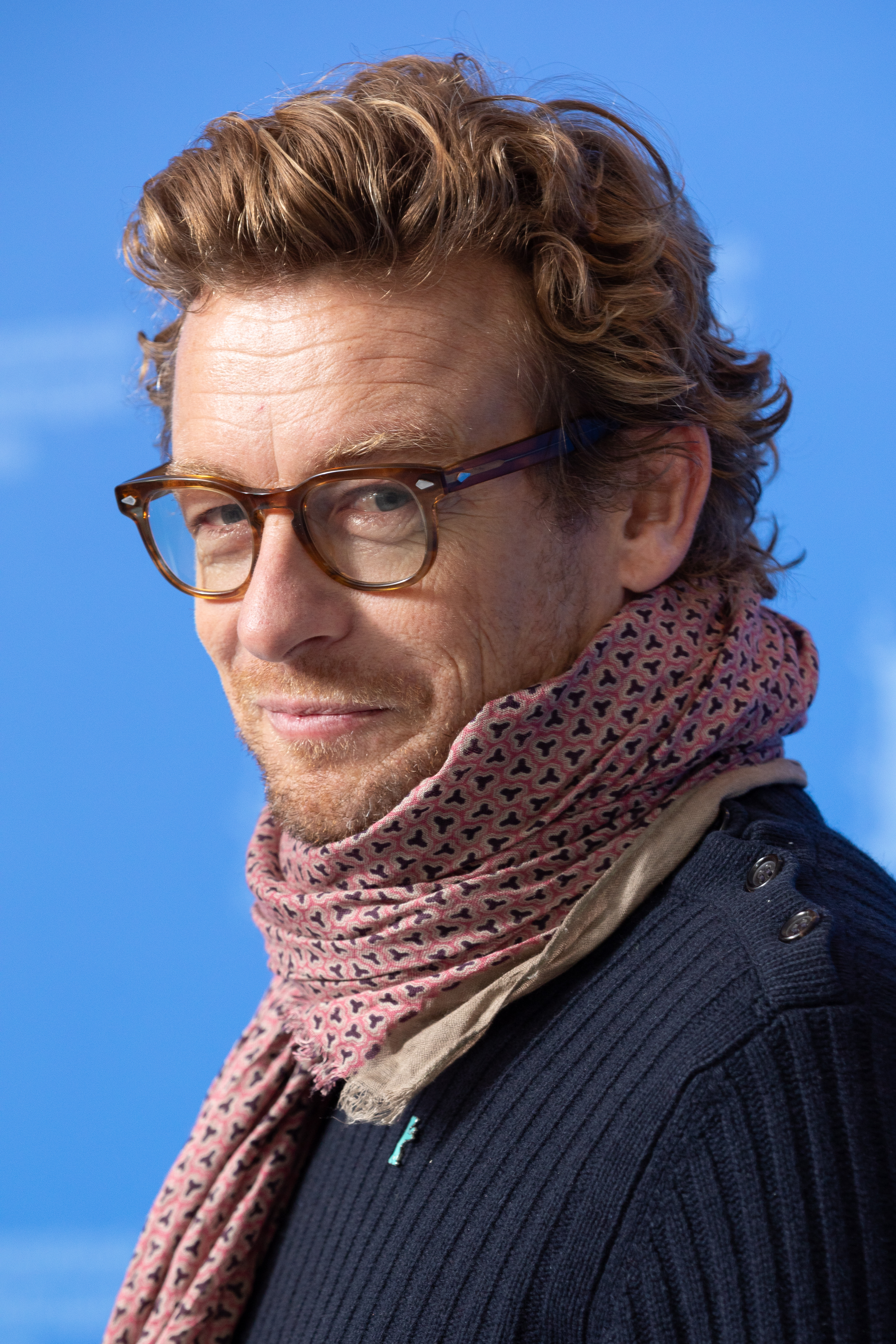
- Baker in February 2020
- Born: Simon Lucas Baker; 30 July 1969 (age 57); Launceston, Tasmania, Australia
- Other names: Simon Denny; Simon Denny Baker; Simon Baker-Denny
- Citizenship: Australia; United States
- Occupations: Actor; filmmaker; model
- Years active: 1992–present
- Spouse: Rebecca Rigg (m. 1998; sep. 2020)
- Children: 3, including Stella

Simon Lucas Baker (born 30 July 1969) is an Australian actor and director. He appeared on the Australian soap opera E Street (1992–1993). In 1997 he had a supporting role as Matt Reynolds in L.A. Confidential (1997). This role marked his American film debut and a pivotal turning point in his career, successfully establishing his presence in the international film industry.

He starred in the CBS legal drama The Guardian (2001–2004), for which he received a Golden Globe nomination for Best Actor in a Television Series – Drama in 2002. He played Patrick Jane in the 2008–2015 procedural drama series The Mentalist, earning a Primetime Emmy Award nomination for Outstanding Lead Actor in a Drama Series in 2009. Baker has also appeared in several films, including, Restaurant (1998), The Devil Wears Prada (2006), and Margin Call (2011).

== Early life ==
Simon Lucas Baker was born on July 30 1969 in Launceston, Tasmania. His father, Barry, was a mechanic and school caretaker, and his mother, Elizabeth, was a high-school English teacher. He has an older sister, two half-brothers and a half-sister. Baker's family moved to New Guinea when Baker was nine months old. His parents' marriage ended when he was two, and his father did not get in touch until Baker was an adult. His mother remarried to Tom Denny, a butcher, but Baker did not get on well with his stepfather. His mother and stepfather divorced.

Baker spent part of his childhood living in the suburbs of Sydney, but he mainly grew up in the Northern Rivers coastal town of Lennox Head, New South Wales. He attended high school at Ballina High School and Trinity Catholic College. Baker has been an avid surfer since his youth, and he considers surfing and the relationships with his surfing friends an important part of his upbringing. Following high school graduation, Baker moved to the Gold Coast with a few of his friends into a beachfront fibro shack in Surfers Paradise where he would spend his days surfing in the morning and working as a pool boy at the recently opened Hyatt Regency in Sanctuary Cove.

== Career ==
Baker's first acting role was in a commercial. He got the role while waiting for a friend to audition when he himself was asked to audition for it. From 1992 until its cancellation in 1993, Baker played Constable Sam Farrell in E Street. The role earned him the Logie Award for Most Popular New Talent award in 1993. After E Street, Baker received several job offers and he accepted a guest role in A Country Practice as mechanic Stewart Waterman, who comes into conflict with his father Jack (played by Frankie J. Holden). He also filmed an appearance in G.P.. In November 1993, he joined the cast of Home and Away for eight weeks as James Hudson, a teacher and love interest for Roxy Miller (Lisa Lackey). He also appeared in Heartbreak High as Tom Summers in 1996.

Baker relocated to the United States in the mid-1990s. In 1997, he appeared in a supporting role in L.A. Confidential.

Baker is known for his portrayal of Patrick Jane in the television series The Mentalist co-starring with Robin Tunney. In 2010, he was earning US$350,000 per episode of the show. Shortly afterwards, he signed a new contract that delivered a payment of US$30 million for his role of the title character.

He portrayed Nick Fallin in The Guardian.

In film, he is known for his roles as Max Rourke in the remake of the Japanese horror film The Ring Two, Riley Denbo in Land of the Dead, and Christian Thompson in the film adaptation of The Devil Wears Prada.

Baker made his directorial debut with the 2017 film Breath. He also co-wrote, co-produced and starred in the film. It is based on the Tim Winton novel.

In 2026, Baker won the Logie Award for Best Supporting Actor in a Drama for his performance in the 2025 television miniseries The Narrow Road to the Deep North.

== Honours ==
In June 2012, Baker was invited to join the Academy of Motion Picture Arts and Sciences along with 175 other individuals.

On 14 February 2013, Baker was honoured with a star on the Hollywood Walk of Fame for his contribution to the entertainment industry. Baker's star can be found at 6352 Hollywood Blvd.

== Personal life ==
Baker married Australian actress Rebecca Rigg on 2 October 1998, after five years of living together. Baker told The Ellen DeGeneres Show that one of their two weddings was held on the beach at Carmel-by-the-Sea, California. They have a daughter, Stella, and two sons. Baker and Rigg separated in April 2020.

Baker was raised Catholic, but became agnostic.

Baker follows the Parramatta Eels in the National Rugby League.

== Filmography ==
=== Film ===
Year	Title	Role	Notes
1997	L.A. Confidential	Matt Reynolds	
1997	Most Wanted	Stephen Barnes	
1998	Restaurant	Kenny	
1998	Judas Kiss	Junior Armstrong	
1998	Love from Ground Zero	Eric	
1999	Ride with the Devil	George Clyde	
2000	Sunset Strip	Michael Scott	
2000	Red Planet	Chip Pettengill	
2001	The Affair of the Necklace	Rétaux de Villette	
2004	Book of Love	David Walker	
2005	The Ring Two	Max Rourke	
2005	Land of the Dead	Riley Denbo	
2006	Something New	Brian Kelly	
2006	The Devil Wears Prada	Christian Thompson	
2007	Sex and Death 101	Roderick Blank	
2007	The Key to Reserva	Roger Thornberry	Short film
2009	The Lodger	Malcolm Slaight	
2009	Not Forgotten	Jack Bishop	
2009	Women in Trouble	Travis McPherson	
2010	The Killer Inside Me	Howard Hendricks	
2011	Margin Call	Jared Cohen	
2013	I Give It a Year	Guy Harrap	
2017	Breath	Bill 'Sando' Sanderson	Also director, co-producer and co-writer
2018	Here and Now	Nick	
2020	High Ground	Travis	Also executive producer
2022	Blaze	Luke	
2023	Limbo	Travis Hurley	Also executive producer
2026	Klara and the Sun	Paul	Scenes deleted

=== Television ===
Year	Title	Role	Notes
1988	Shades of Love: Midnight Magic	—N/a	Television film
1989	Tales from the Crypt	Party Guest	Episode: "Only Sin Deep"
1992–1993	E Street	Constable Sam Farrell	112 episodes
1993	A Country Practice	Stewart Waterman	2 episodes
1993	GP	Ben Miller	Episode: "A Family Affair"
1993–1994	Home and Away	James Hudson	19 episodes
1994	Which Way to the War	Private Stan Hawke	Television pilot
1995	Naked	—N/a	Television pilot
1995–1996	Heartbreak High	Mr. Thomas 'Tom' Summers	8 episodes
1996	Naked: Stories of Men	Gabriel	Episode: "Blind-Side Breakaway"
1996	Sweat	Paul Steadman	Episode: "Episode 3"
1999	Secret Men's Business	Andy Greville	Television film
2001–2004	The Guardian	Nick Fallin	67 episodes; also director
2006	Smith	Jeff Breen	7 episodes
2008–2015	The Mentalist	Patrick Jane	151 episodes; also director and producer
2022	Roar	Adam	Episode: "The Woman Who Ate Photographs"
2024	Boy Swallows Universe	Robert Bell	7 episodes
2025	The Narrow Road to the Deep North	Keith Mulvaney	4 episodes
2025	Ten Pound Poms	Sidney Skinner	Episode: "Episode 2"
2026	Scarpetta	Benton Wesley	8 episodes
TBA	Lioness	—N/a	Director and producer

== Awards and nominations ==
Year	Award	Category	Work	Result	Ref.
1993	Logie Awards	Most Popular New Talent	E Street	Won	
2000	Australian Film Institute Awards	Best Performance by an Actor in a Leading Role in a Telefeature or Mini-Series	Secret Men's Business	Nominated	
2002	Golden Globe Awards	Best Performance by an Actor in a Television Series – Drama	The Guardian	Nominated	
2004	Logie Awards	Most Popular Overseas TV Star	The Guardian	Nominated	
2005	PRISM Awards	Performance in a Drama Series Storyline	The Guardian	Nominated	
2009	Primetime Emmy Awards	Outstanding Lead Actor in a Drama Series	The Mentalist	Nominated	
2010	Golden Globe Awards	Best Performance by an Actor in a Television Series – Drama	The Mentalist	Nominated	
2010	Screen Actors Guild Awards	Outstanding Performance by a Male Actor in a Drama Series	The Mentalist	Nominated	
2010	Australian Film Institute Awards	Best Actor	The Mentalist	Nominated	
2011	People's Choice Awards	Favorite TV Crime Fighter	The Mentalist	Nominated	
2011	Gotham Awards	Best Ensemble Performance	Margin Call	Nominated	
2012	Independent Spirit Awards	Robert Altman Award	Margin Call	Won	
2015	People's Choice Awards	Favorite Crime Drama TV Actor	The Mentalist	Nominated	
2017	Australian Academy of Cinema and Television Arts Awards	Trailblazer Award		Honored	
2018	Australian Directors Guild Awards	Best Direction in a Feature Film	Breath	Won	
2018	Seattle International Film Festival	Best Feature Film	Breath	Nominated	
2018	Australian Academy of Cinema and Television Arts Awards	Best Supporting Actor	Breath	Won	
2018	Australian Academy of Cinema and Television Arts Awards	Best Adapted Screenplay (Shared with Gerard Lee and Tim Winton)	Breath	Nominated	
2018	Australian Academy of Cinema and Television Arts Awards	Best Direction	Breath	Nominated	
2018	Australian Academy of Cinema and Television Arts Awards	Best Film (Shared with Mark Johnson and Jamie Hilton)	Breath	Nominated	
2019	Australian Film Critics Association Awards	Best Supporting Actor	Breath	Nominated	
2019	Australian Film Critics Association Awards	Best Screenplay (Shared with Gerard Lee)	Breath	Nominated	
2019	Australian Film Critics Association Awards	Best Director	Breath	Nominated	
2019	Film Critics Circle of Australia Awards	Best Supporting Actor	Breath	Won	
2019	Film Critics Circle of Australia Awards	Best Script (Shared with Gerard Lee and Tim Winton)	Breath	Won	
2019	Film Critics Circle of Australia Awards	Best Director	Breath	Nominated	
2019	Film Critics Circle of Australia Awards	Best Film (Shared with Mark Johnson and Jamie Hilton)	Breath	Nominated	
2021	Australian Academy of Cinema and Television Arts Awards	Best Lead Actor in Film	High Ground	Nominated	
2022	Australian Academy of Cinema and Television Arts Awards	Best Supporting Actor in Film	Blaze	Nominated	
2023	Film Critics Circle of Australia Awards	Best Supporting Actor	Blaze	Nominated	
2024	Australian Academy of Cinema and Television Arts Awards	Best Lead Actor in Film	Limbo	Nominated	
2024	Film Critics Circle of Australia Awards	Best Actor	Limbo	Nominated	
2024	Logie Awards	Best Lead Actor in a Drama	Boy Swallows Universe	Nominated	
2024	Asian Academy Creative Awards	Best Actor in a Supporting Role	Boy Swallows Universe	Won	
2025	Australian Academy of Cinema and Television Arts Awards	Best Supporting Actor in a Drama	Boy Swallows Universe	Nominated	
2026	Logie Awards	Best Supporting Actor in a Drama	The Narrow Road to the Deep North	Won	
