= Amanda Douge =

Australian actress

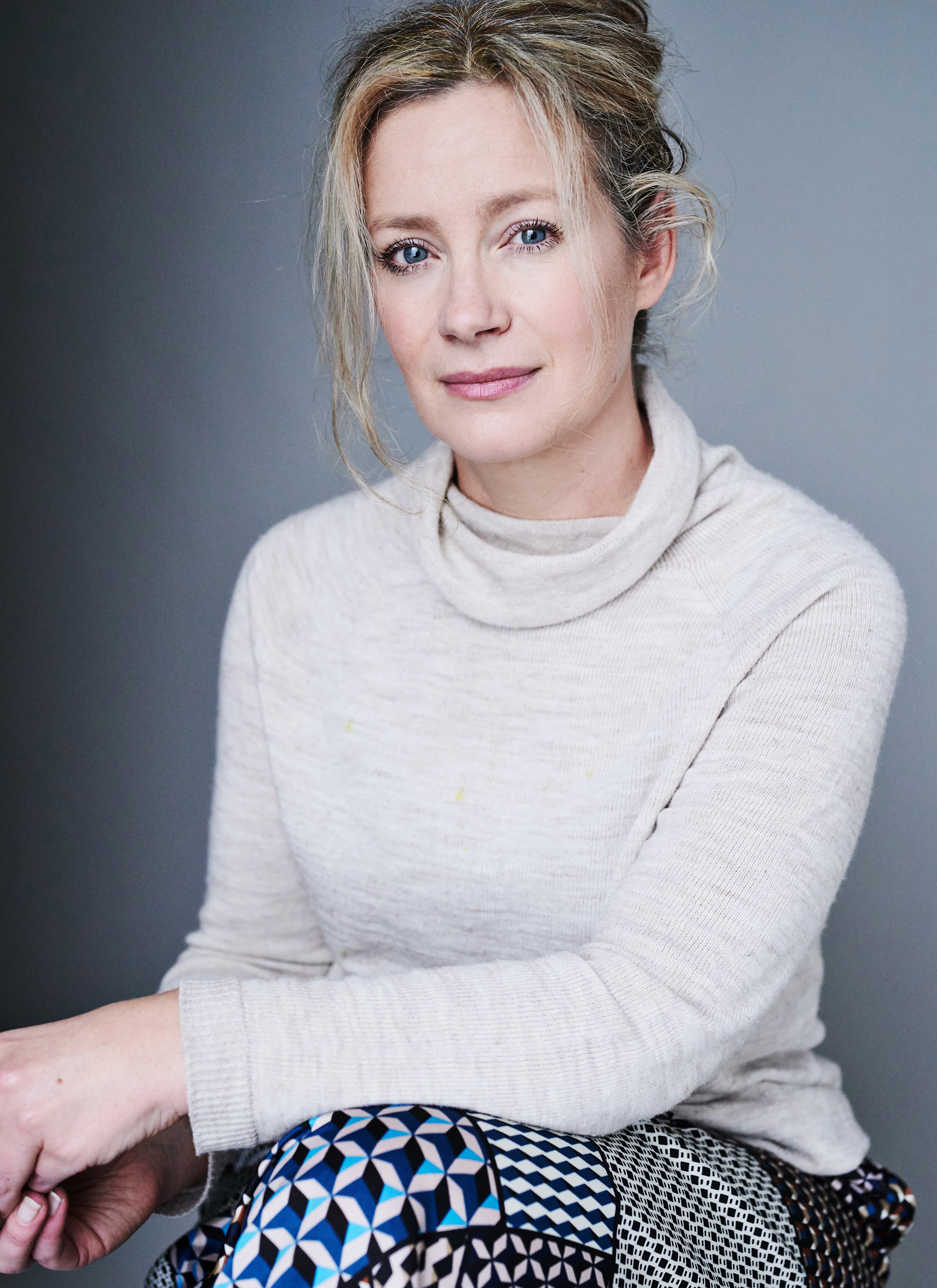
- Born: December 1976 (age 49); Melbourne, Victoria, Australia
- Occupations: Actress, writer, climate scholar
- Years active: 1991–present

Amanda Douge (born December 1976) is an Australian actress, theatre-maker, writer, and doctoral researcher known for her versatile career spanning film, television, stage performances, and academic work on climate transformations.

== Early life and education ==
Douge was born in Melbourne in 1976, and studied law at Melbourne University (1993). She has a Masters of Letters in Creative Writing and is a PhD candidate at the University of Glasgow (2024).

She has extensively studied the Michael Chekhov technique (1997–2001).

== Career ==
Douge's first on-screen was in an episode of The Flying Doctors in 1990. Shortly afterwards, she appeared as Annabelle Deacon in 8 episodes of Neighbours. She eventually secured regular roles in TV series' Halfway Across the Galaxy and Turn Left (1993–1994) as the voice of Dovis, The Man from Snowy River (1994–1996) as Victoria Blackwood and Raw FM (1997–1998) as Gerry Sano, she also played Kylen Celina in Fox's Space Above and Beyond (1995–96). From 2002 to 2003 she had a recurring role as Jennifer, a medical colleague of Alex and Rex on The Secret Life of Us.

She has also appeared on film, as Nellie Bolster in Hammers Over the Anvil (1993), Elloise Noble in Body Melt (1993) and most notably as Tegwyn Flack in the film adaptation of Tim Winton's novel, That Eye, the Sky (1994), a role for which she won a Best Supporting Actress award at the Australian Film Institute Awards.

Douge has performed with the Melbourne Theatre Company, La Mama Theatre and Malthouse Theatre. In 2002, she founded the Hoist Theatre Group, an ensemble which produced four critically acclaimed plays in Australia.

Douge has been based in the UK since 2005. Her first role after moving to London was appearing with David Suchet in Poirot: Taken at the Flood.

She became interested in arts education and has taught drama in the UK, at Blackheath Conservatoire. From 2016 to 2023 Douge ran a local children's theatre ensemble from Mycenae House, Greenwich.

She played Becky Gallagher, the mentally ill twin sister of Dr. Jack Gallagher on the US Fox drama Mental (2009).

Douge appeared in two episodes of Hijack, starring Idris Elba (2023). Douge appears in the series Kaos for Netflix in the role of Andromache (2024).

== Filmography ==
=== Film ===
| Year | Title | Role | Notes |
|---|---|---|---|
| 1993 | Hammers Over the Anvil | Nellie Bolster | |
| 1993 | Body Melt | Elloise Noble | |
| 1994 | That Eye, the Sky | Tegwyn Flack | |
| 2002 | Till Human Voices Wake Us | Katherine | |
| 2003 | Horseplay | Grace | |
| 2006 | Irresistible | Dress Shop Assistant | |
| 2006 | Five Moments of Infidelity | Vicki | |
| 2009 | Nine Miles Down | Kat | |
| 2009 | Another Thing | Blonde woman | Short film |

=== Television ===
| Year | Title | Role | Notes |
|---|---|---|---|
| 1990 | The Flying Doctors | Kath | "A Place for the Night" |
| 1990 | Neighbours | Annabelle Deacon | Recurring role |
| 1991 | A Country Practice | Belinda Mason | "Simply the Best: Parts 1 & 2" |
| 1993–94 | Halfway Across the Galaxy and Turn Left | Dovis (voice) | Regular role |
| 1994–1996 | The Man from Snowy River | Victoria Blackwood | Recurring role |
| 1995 | Halifax f.p. | Lauren Hayward | "My Lovely Girl" |
| 1995 | Breaking News | Cammy | "A Man of His Convictions" |
| 1995–96 | Space: Above and Beyond | Kylen Celina | "Pilot", "Choice or Chance", "... Tell Our Moms We Done Our Best" |
| 1997 | State Coroner | Lee Turkel | "Dance 'Till You Drop" |
| 1997–98 | Raw FM | Gerry Sano | Regular role |
| 1999 | Water Rats | Carly Middleton | "Shark Bait" |
| 1999 | Close Contact | Liz Price | TV film |
| 1999 | The Lost World | Talibo | "Paradise Found" |
| 2002 | MDA | Lucy Carlton | "Love You to Death" |
| 2002–03 | The Secret Life of Us | Jennifer | Recurring role |
| 2003 | Stingers | Lucy Manella | "Cold War" |
| 2003 | Blue Heelers | Shaylee Simms | "The New Perfect" |
| 2003 | CrashBurn | Gina | "One Free Ticket to the Seychelles" |
| 2004 | Love Bytes | Clare | TV series |
| 2006 | Agatha Christie's Poirot | Lynn Marchmont | "Taken at the Flood" |
| 2006 | Sugar Rush | Dr. Candida | "2.6", "2.7" |
| 2006 | Sinchronicity | Dr. Reeves | "1.3" |
| 2007 | New Tricks | Sian Elton | "Nine Lives" |
| 2007 | Talk to Me | Cassie Cox | TV series |
| 2007 | Empathy | Sarah | TV film |
| 2009 | Breaking the Mould | Ethel Florey | TV film |
| 2009 | Mental | Becky Gallagher | "Do Over", "Lines in the Sand", "Life and Limb" |
| 2010 | Vexed | Charlotte | "1.2" |
| 2021 | Unforgotten | Janet | Series 4 |
| 2022 | Kaos | Andromache | "1.3, 1.4","1.5" "1.8" |
| 2023 | Kingdom | News Anchor | "1.5", "1.6" |
| 2023 | Hijack | Newsreader | "Comply Slowly", "Brace Brace Brace" |
| 2024 | Kaos | Andromache | TV series |

== Theatre ==
=== As actor ===
| Year | Title | Role | Venue / Company |
|---|---|---|---|
| 1990 | Advice from a Caterpillar | | La Mama, Universal Theatre, Melbourne |
| 1990 | Alice's Adventures in Wonderland | | Werribee Park with Australian Shakespeare Company |
| 1992 | Vs. | | La Mama for Melbourne International Comedy Festival |
| 1994 | The Lady from the Sea | Hilde | Russell Street Theatre |
| 1997 | Blackrock | | Subiaco Theatre Centre with Black Swan State Theatre Company |
| 1997 | Jungfrau | Thea McKinley | Malthouse Theatre with Playbox Theatre Company |
| 1997 | The Tempest | | Malthouse Theatre with Horned Moon Productions |
| 2000 | Off The Point | | Trades Hall, Melbourne |
| 2000 | Death of a Salesman | Woman / Miss Forsythe / Jenny | Fairfax Studio with MTC |
| 2001 | The Duchess of Malfi | Midwife | Fairfax Studio with MTC |
| 2002 | It's a Family Affair | Ustinya Naumovna | Arts House Meat Market, North Melbourne Town Hall with The Hoist Theatre Group |
| 2002 | Antigone | | Fortyfivedownstairs with The Hoist Theatre Group |
| 2002 | Medea | | Horti Hall Gallery, Melbourne with Melbourne International Arts Festival |
| 2003 | The Government Inspector | Bob & various roles | Arts House Meat Market, North Melbourne Town Hall with The Hoist Theatre Group |
| 2004 | Honour | Claudia | Fairfax Studio with MTC |
| 2004 | Bold Girls | | Melbourne & Victorian regional tour with Look Look Theatre |
| 2004 | Gamegirl | | Fairfax Studio, Melbourne, Playhouse Theatre, Perth with Arena Theatre Company |
| 2007 | Splendour | The Photographer | The Project Space, Dublin |
| 2019 | The Daughter Abroad | The Mother | Theatre 503, London |

=== As crew ===
| Year | Title | Role | Venue / Company |
|---|---|---|---|
| | Romeo and Juliet | Director | Newtown Theatre, Sydney |
| | Henry V | Director | Newtown Theatre, Sydney |
| | The Fall | Adaptor | Melbourne Writers Festival |
| 2002 | Bearhunt | Director | Chunky Move Studios, Melbourne with The Hoist Theatre Group |
| 2003 | The Fall | Director | The Stork Hotel, Melbourne |
| 2015-16 | Fantasmata | Creator / Director | The Asylum Space & Peckham Festival, UK |
| 2020-22 | St Joan/Greta | Creator | Peckham Festival, UK |

== Awards ==
| Year | Nominated work | Award | Category | Result |
|---|---|---|---|---|
| 1995 | That Eye, the Sky | Australian Film Institute Awards | Best Actress in a Supporting Role | Won |
| 1995 | That Eye, the Sky | Film Critics Circle Award | Best Supporting Actress | Won |
| | Amanda Douge | The Queens Trust Awards | Young Australians for the Achievement of Excellence | Won |
| | Amanda Douge | Ian Potter Cultural Awards | Outstanding Potential in the Arts | Won |
| 2002 | Medea | Green Room Awards | | Nominated |
| 2007 | Splendour | | Best Ensemble | Nominated |
