= Scission and Other Stories =

- Author: Tim Winton
- Language: English
- Publication date: 1985

First edition (publ. McPhee Gribble "A Penguin Original")

Scission and Other Stories, sometimes simply Scission, is a 1985 collection of short stories by Australian author Tim Winton.

It won the 1985 Western Australian Council Literary Award, and was also 1985 Joint Winner Western Australian Premier's Book Award - Fiction.

== Contents ==
This was Winton's first collection of stories. There are 13 short stories:

- "Secrets"
- "A Blow, a Kiss"
- "Getting Ahead"
- "My Father's Axe"
- "Wake"
- "Lantern Stalk"
- "Thomas Awkner Floats"
- "Wilderness"
- "Neighbours"
- "A Measure of Eloquence"
- "The Oppressed"
- "The Woman at the Well"
- "Scission"

The stories are described as, " ... spare, jagged stories in which people struggle with change and disintegration ... These startling stories deal with men, women and children whose lives are coming apart and whose hearts are breaking. Honest, beautiful, shattering tales - vintage Winton."

== Themes ==
The title Scission describes the action or state of cutting or being cut, and each of the stories carries this theme, involving family, neighbours, and strangers.

== Awards ==
- 1985: Winner, Western Australian Council Literary Award
- 1985: Joint winner, Western Australian Premier's Book Award - Fiction

== Film adaptation ==
A short film, A Blow, a Kiss, directed by Rey Carlson and produced by Rhonda Schepisi, was released in 1996. Three days after filming had finished, production was completed by Carlson. The film screened at the 1997 Seattle International Film Festival.

== See also ==
- Blood and Water, short story collection
