= Storm Sequence =

Video artwork

Storm Sequence is a video artwork by Australian contemporary artist Shaun Gladwell completed in 2000. The video is arguably the best known work of Gladwell's artworks and features the artist skateboarding on a concrete platform by the oceanside. Within the 11-minute duration of the video, Gladwell performs balletic freestyle skateboarding manoeuvres as a storm gathers intensity in the background. Storm Sequence is one of the first videos to be traded as an artwork within the Australian Art market, thus launching the medium commercially in Australia.

Juliana Engberg describes the piece as "Iconic, mesmerising, atmospheric and in a zone of its own, Storm Sequence is compelling in its use of place, pace and proposition."

"The strange, poetic intervention of the natural world, combined with the well-known nature of the place where it is performed, creates a compelling and mesmeric work. The importance of Storm Sequence lies in the pivotal role it has played in the reception, exhibition and acceptance of moving image as an art form in this country. This work is an important cornerstone in the MCA's Collection."
