= The Bugalugs Bum Thief =

Novel by Tim Winton

- First edition (publ. Puffin)
- Author: Tim Winton
- Illustrator: Carol Pelham-Thorman
- Publisher: Puffin Books
- Publication date: January 1, 1991
- ISBN: 978-0-140-34734-0

The Bugalugs Bum Thief (1991) is a children's novel written by Australian author Tim Winton and illustrated by Carol Pelham-Thorman.

== Plot ==
The Bugalugs Bum Thief is a comedic mystery story about Skeeta Anderson. Skeeta wakes up to find that his bum is missing. After discovering that everyone in Bugalugs is also missing their bum, he embarks on a journey to find the bum thief.

== Reception ==
Reviews by readers:

I really enjoyed this book. It was very quick to read, but it was fun. I would recommend this book for younger readers and older readers who are looking for a quick, funny read. My mum enjoyed [sic] reading it to my younger brother and sister as well.

The book is OK, but only if you are interested in bums. My younger bro liked it, so it's probably best for kids around 4-7 that love bums.

Hilarious! I laughed my bum off!

In 1994, The Bugalugs Bum Thief won the CROW Award for Years 3-5. In 1998, it won the YABBA Award for Fiction for Younger Readers.

== Theatrical adaptation ==
The monkey baa theatre company has toured extensively with a production of The Bugalugs Bum Thief. The first tour was in schools New South Wales (NSW) in 1998 followed by a second tour in 1999 through NSW, ACT, Victoria, and Tasmania to schools, libraries and community halls. During that tour they also staged performances at Glen Street Theatre in Sydney. They toured again in 2002 to 13 theatres in New South Wales, the ACT and to the Arts Centre, Melbourne.

In 2005 and 2006 they toured the production in Queensland in conjunction with the Queensland Arts Council.

There were further monkey baa productions staged at several venues in Sydney Theatres in April - May 2015.

== Series ==
Aussie Bites - a series of Australian children's books published by Puffin.
