= The Boy Behind the Curtain =

Book by Tim Winton

- First edition
- Author: Tim Winton
- Language: English
- Genre: Autobiography
- Publisher: Penguin Books
- Publication date: 2016

The Boy Behind the Curtain (2016) is an autobiographical work by multi award-winning Australian author Tim Winton. Through a series of short stories, he chronicles important events which helped to shape his life and his writing.

== Collection ==
There are 22 pieces in the book, sixteen of which have been published previously. Winton writes of his childhood, of being the son of a policeman, the environment, and of his youth. His policeman father was involved in a major motorbike accident and his recovery led to the family joining the Church of Christ. There were long hours of attendance at the church and he later realised the profound effect it had on his writing:

It also exposed him to story. Long before he recognised the Bible as "a storehouse of experience and longing", Winton recalls a childhood in which, "by a process I don't understand even now, the occult power of metaphor revealed itself". He grew "increasingly enthralled" by Bible imagery: Christ as the rock and also water, Paul speaking of how creation "groans in travail". In the sun-blasted Western Australia of his youth, church was where he found the "organic and sustaining" power of language. These images and stories became the "nutrition" for his writing, about which he says: "I didn't catch the bug at school, I picked it up in church."

== Reviews ==
Ashley Hay in the Australian wrote, "The Boy Behind the Curtain is a beautiful object, with clear space around many of its chapters, as if you might want to pause, or ease them apart to hand on to your friends." He goes on that the essays are "fiercely personal", and include the descriptions and created images for which he is known. You gain a sense of how Winton sees his place in the world now and the events that have shaped him.

Malcolm Knox, in his Sydney Morning Herald article, says that "... this collection reveals some of the connective tissue between the novels and the man".

In his novels the lives of his characters are overtaken by emotions and events over which they have no control. The stories Tim Winton has included in the collection also show that his live has been molded by accidents, unexpected events and chaos. The book is funny, irreverent, honest, and full of joy.

"Winton's latest book, The Boy Behind the Curtain, is a collection of true stories, about his life and the things that matter to him - his family, the ocean, human kindness, and books."

== Awards/Nominations ==
2017 longlisted Indie Awards — Nonfiction

== Talking book ==
A spoken-word copy of the book, read by Winton, is available as a seven-CD boxed set, published by ABC/Bolinda.
