= Breath (2017 film) =

- Theatrical release poster
- Directed by: Simon Baker
- Screenplay by: Gerard Lee; Simon Baker; Tim Winton
- Based on: Breath by Tim Winton
- Produced by: Mark Johnson; Simon Baker; Jamie Hilton
- Starring: Simon Baker; Elizabeth Debicki; Samson Coulter; Ben Spence; Richard Roxburgh
- Cinematography: Marden Dean; Rick Rifici
- Edited by: Dany Cooper
- Music by: Harry Gregson-Williams
- Production companies: Gran Via; Windalong; See Pictures
- Distributed by: Roadshow Films
- Release dates: 10 September 2017 (TIFF); 3 May 2018 (Australia)
- Running time: 116 minutes
- Country: Australia
- Language: English
- Box office: $3.2 million

Breath is a 2017 Australian sports drama film based on the 2008 novel by Tim Winton, and directed by Simon Baker, from a screenplay that Baker and Winton co-wrote with Gerard Lee. Baker also stars in the film alongside Elizabeth Debicki, Samson Coulter, Ben Spence and Richard Roxburgh.

It premiered at the 2017 Toronto International Film Festival and the 2017 Zurich Film Festival. It was released on 3 May 2018 in Australia by Roadshow Films, and on 1 June 2018 in the United States by FilmRise.

== Plot ==
In the 1970s, two teenage surfer boys, Pikelet and Loonie, growing up in a small town meet and form a connection with an older surfer named Sando, who challenges them to take greater and more dangerous risks.

== Cast ==
- Simon Baker as Sando
- Elizabeth Debicki as Eva
- Samson Coulter as Pikelet
- Ben Spence as Loonie
- Richard Roxburgh as Mr Pike
- Rachael Blake as Mrs Pike
- Jacek Koman as Karl Loon

== Production ==
The film is the feature directorial debut of Simon Baker, who also acted in the film and produced it with Mark Johnson and Australian Jamie Hilton. Johnson met Tim Winton in America where he was on a book tour and obtained an option on the book. Winton wrote the first screenplay with the final script by Gerard Lee, Baker and Winton. Financing was provided by "the Australian art councils and... from Screen Australia to ScreenWest", Great Southern Development Commission and Autumn Productions. The Western Australian Government contributed $2.3 million in a bid to promote the state as a premier filming location.

=== Themes ===
Producer Mark Johnson said, "It's got universal themes—about being desperately afraid that you're ordinary, about being afraid as a young man that there's nothing exceptional about you—and I think that has great application in a universal way, but this is also a specifically Western Australian story". Simon Baker's view is that "Tim's book viscerally captures the restless curiosity and yearning for identity that often defines our coming of age".

=== Filming ===
The Western Australian coastal town of Denmark, part of the Great Southern region, is the location for filming. For Tim Winton this was an ideal location; "The Great Southern region has had an enormous impact on my life and work so I'm very pleased this film is being shot on the beaches and streets and forests that inspired the book."

== Reception ==
On review aggregator website Rotten Tomatoes, the film holds an approval rating of 80%, based on 50 reviews, and an average rating of 6.63/10. The website's critical consensus reads, "A coming of age drama with a surfing twist, Breath navigates seemingly familiar waters — but has surprising depth below the surface." On Metacritic, the film has a weighted average score of 71 out of 100, based on 14 critics, indicating "generally favorable reviews".

Writing for The Australian, critic David Stratton wrote, "Intimacy is probably more difficult to capture on screen than bigger emotions, and Baker succeeds admirably in bringing to life the characters of these two impressionable boys and the adults who change their lives." In a glowing review, critic Brent McKnight, stated "Think a more thoughtful “Point Break” with less bank robbery — it displays quieter machismo."

In The Globe and Mail, Joanne Schneller praised Baker's directing, concluding, "Baker proves himself a talented director; he manages the rolling rhythms of his waves and his story with skill – especially a montage around Pikelet’s sexual awakening, which is at once funny, steamy and poignant." Similarly, writing for The Austin Chronicle, Steve Davis also praised the directing by saying "Baker paces the film similarly to reading a book. There’s a leisurely pleasure in the way he allows things to unfold".

=== Accolades ===
Award	Category	Subject	Result
AACTA Awards (8th)	Best Film	Jamie Hilton	Nominated
AACTA Awards (8th)	Best Film	Mark Johnson	Nominated
AACTA Awards (8th)	Best Film	Simon Baker	Nominated
AACTA Awards (8th)	Best Direction	Simon Baker	Nominated
AACTA Awards (8th)	Best Adapted Screenplay	Simon Baker	Nominated
AACTA Awards (8th)	Best Adapted Screenplay	Gerard Lee	Nominated
AACTA Awards (8th)	Best Adapted Screenplay	Tim Winton	Nominated
AACTA Awards (8th)	Best Supporting Actor	Simon Baker	Won
AACTA Awards (8th)	Best Supporting Actress	Elizabeth Debicki	Nominated
AACTA Awards (8th)	Best Cinematography	Marden Dean	Nominated
AACTA Awards (8th)	Best Cinematography	Rick Rifici	Nominated
AACTA Awards (8th)	Best Editing	Dany Cooper	Nominated
AACTA Awards (8th)	Best Sound	Jed Dodge	Won
AACTA Awards (8th)	Best Sound	Trevor Hope	Won
AACTA Awards (8th)	Best Sound	Mackenzie	Won
AACTA Awards (8th)	Best Sound	Tara Webb	Won
