= Jesse (picture book) =

1988 children's book by Tim Winton

cover image (publ. Puffin)

Jesse (1988) is a children's picture book written by Australian author Tim Winton and illustrated by Maureen Prichard. It is the story of a small boy exploring the wild countryside beyond his garden gate - all alone.

== Story ==
When his parents are still sleeping Jesse puts on his gumboots and goes outside to explore. He goes beyond his own yard and out into the country side. He discovers the world beyond his own yard is both friendly and scary. When darkness comes Jesse is lost but he is helped by other animals who lead him home.

== Review ==
A Montessori Book Review described Jesse as having an "unmistakably Australian landscape" with "lots of sensory details ... Lovely picture book that I think children from 2 or 3 up to early adolescence would enjoy thoroughly."

== Awards ==
1990 Winner Western Australian Premier's Book Awards: Children's Book
