= Local Colour: Travels in the Other Australia =

1994 photography book

- First edition
- Author: Bill Bachman, Tim Winton
- Publisher: Odyssey, Hong Kong
- Publication date: 1994

Local Colour: Travels in the Other Australia is a book containing photography and text by Bill Bachman with additional text by Tim Winton.

It was published in 1994 and reprinted in 2000 and 2002. It was published in the US as Australian Colors: Images of the Outback in 1998 and reprinted in 2000.
