= Juice (novel) =

2024 novel by Tim Winton

- Author: Tim Winton
- Language: English
- Publication date: 2024

Juice is a 2024 climate fiction novel by Australian writer Tim Winton, set in a future Australia devastated by climate change and capitalist exploitation. It is written in the voice of an unnamed narrator.

== Plot ==
The narrator, who remains unnamed, tells the story of his upbringing and survival in the plains after being captured by an unnamed antagonist referred to as the bowman.

Raised by his enigmatic single mother, the narrator describes how he evolved from a simple agrarian life on the now-sweltering land (which required them to spend half the year in underground habitation), to recruitment by a shadowy organisation that trains highly skilled assassins. The narrator's story traces how he balanced his love of the everyday community he grew up with for the desire to participate in something larger; however, as The Guardian book review notes, "The protagonist's double life as a plainsman and agent of vengeance soon became unsustainable".

== Background, themes, and genre ==
The novel, published in 2024, was Winton's first in six years. It is a departure from Winton's previous work, serving as his first foray into science fiction. The novel is set in a future Australia devastated by climate change and capitalist exploitation, putting it in the climate fiction genre.

== Reception and accolades ==
Juice was shortlisted for the 2025 Prime Minister's Literary Award for Fiction. It was longlisted for the 2025 Miles Franklin Literary Award (which Winton has received four times), but did not make the shortlist.

== Film adaptation ==
In July 2026, Working Title Films purchased the film rights to the novel and hired Joe Wright to direct and Abi Morgan to write the screenplay.
