= Greenway's grunter =

Conservation status
- Least Concern (IUCN 3.1)

Scientific classification
- Kingdom: Animalia
- Phylum: Chordata
- Class: Actinopterygii
- Order: Centrarchiformes
- Family: Terapontidae
- Genus: Hannia; Vari, 1978
- Species: H. greenwayi

Binomial name
- Hannia greenwayi Vari, 1978

Species of fish

Greenway's grunter (Hannia greenwayi) is a species of freshwater ray-finned fish, a grunter from the family Terapontidae. It is endemic to the northern part of Western Australia. The type locality is the Hann River at Moll Gorge; the generic name refers to the type locality.

== Description ==
Greenway's grunter is a small, slender golden to silvery-grey grunter which is covered in large scales, each with a dark margin and a dark blotch on the lower part of the caudal fin. The juveniles have a dark spot at base of the soft-rayed part of the dorsal and anal fin bases. The larger adult fish may develop thick, fleshy, lips and when caught individuals may show broad, vertical bars. This species has a maximum standard length of 14 centimetres (5.5 in), although 8 centimetres (3.1 in) is a more common standard length.

== Distribution ==
Greenway's grunter is endemic to the Kimberley region of Western Australia where it occurs in the Fitzroy River system and Isdell and Calder rivers.

== Habitat and biology ==
The adults of Greenway's grunter are found in moderately to swiftly flowing streams in both clear and turbid water where there is a mixed substrate of sand and rock. Its biology is little known, but in 1969 a collection of 100 specimens of this fish suggested that are found in fast flowing rapids where the water was green in colour and the visibility was as low as 30 centimetres (12 in). It is an omnivorous species feeding on algae and small invertebrates. The eggs are guarded and fanned by the male parent. It is thought likely that this species spawns in the wet season.

== Taxonomy and etymology ==
Greenway's grunter was first formally described in 1971 by Richard P. Vari with the type locality given as the Hann River at Moll Gorge in Western Australia. The generic name refers to the type locality while the specific name honours the American ornithologist James C. Greenway for his generous support of the American Museum of Natural History's Australian expedition on which the type was collected.

== Other species in the genus ==
In 2016, it was announced that 20 new species of fish from the Kimberley had been discovered, of which 16 were new species of Terapontidae. One of these, a 25cm-long grunter found in an unnamed creek flowing into the lower Prince Regent River, was named "Winton's grunter", or Hannia wintoni, after the Western Australian writer and conservationist Tim Winton, which was confirmed in 2020, after Shelley, Delaval, Le Feuvre, Dempster, Raadik & Swearer.
