= Australian Booksellers Association =

The Australian Booksellers Association (ABA) promotes the interests of booksellers in Australia. The association has its origins in state associations formed early in the 20th century, which amalgamated into a federal association in 1924.

The ABA's mission is to advocate for, connect and support booksellers and bookshops. They nurture a thriving bookselling community and represent the collective voice of bookshops in Australia's economy, society and culture.Members range from independent bookshops to chain and franchise shops, as well as specialist, second hand, academic and educational booksellers. The ABA is governed by a Statement of Purposes and Rules, which is available on request.

The purposes of the ABA include establishing bonds between booksellers all over Australia; enhancing the unique role of books in our society; fostering and encouraging the selling of books; providing a national forum for member booksellers; providing technical advice and information to booksellers; providing a range of training and educational programs for members.

The association has a management committee elected by the membership. Members of the committee have a 'stewardship' role towards the membership as a whole and are expected to apply their skills to this task. The management committee assists in improving the association's policy, activities and administration to help the association achieve its objectives. The ABA has a permanent staff under the responsibility of the chief executive officer.

In 2023 the ABA re-branded as "BookPeople" to establish a more consumer-friendly brand, but following member feedback, reverted to the name of "Australian Booksellers Association" in 2026. Australian Booksellers Association is used for industry and advocacy; consumer campaigns and projects such as national book vouchers, Reading Guide and social media are branded "Love Your Bookshop".

The ABA undertakes numerous major projects each year for the benefit of members: the annual national conference in June, three seasonal Reading Guides (Spring, Summer, Autumn) and two Kids' Reading Guide each year, and their annual "Love Your Bookshop Day" which generally falls in October. The Reading Guides detail recommended new releases and classics reviewed by passionate booksellers and specialist children's booksellers.

The ABA manages the annual Book of the Year Awards including Adult Fiction Book of the Year, Adult Non-Fiction Book of the Year, and Children's Book of the Year, given to the Australian new releases that booksellers most enjoyed reading, marketing and hand-selling during the previous year.

== Lifetime Achievement in Bookselling Awards ==
In 2026 the ABA established a new award, The Lifetime Achievement in Bookselling Award, to recognise an individual bookseller for their extraordinary and sustained contribution to bookselling in Australia. This Award is nominated by ABA members or industry individual, determined by a panel and announced at the ABA Conference. 2026 Winners: Graeme Aitken, The Bookshop Darlinghurst and Stefen Brazulaitis, Stefen's Books

== Book of the Year Awards ==
- 2026 Winners:

ABA BookData Adult Fiction Book of the Year: Wild Dark Shore by Charlotte McConaghy (Penguin Random House Australia)

ABA BookData Adult Non-Fiction Book of the Year: Always Home, Always Homesick by Hannah Kent (Picador Australia)

ABA Kids’ Reading Guide Children’s Book of the Year: Here Come the Cousins by Maggie Hutchings & Sarah Zweck (Thames & Hudson Australia)

- 2025 Winners:

BookPeople BookData - Adult Fiction Book of the Year: Dusk by Robbie Arnott (Picador Australia)

BookPeople BookData - Adult Non-Fiction Book of the Year: The Season by Helen Garner (Text Publishing)

BookPeople Kids' Reading Guide: The Midwatch by Judith Rossell (Hardie Grant Children’s Publishing)

- 2024 Winners:

BookPeople BookData – Adult Fiction Book of the Year: Edenglassie by Melissa Lucashenko (University of Queensland Press)

BookPeople BookData – Adult Non-Fiction Book of the Year: Wifedom: Mrs Orwell's Invisible Life by Anna Funder (Hamish Hamilton)

BookPeople Kids' Reading Guide – Children's Book of the Year: If I Was A Horse by Sophie Blackall (Lothian Children's Books)

- 2023 Winners:

ABA Nielsen Book Booksellers' Choice Fiction Book of the Year: Limberlost by Robbie Arnott (Text Publishing)

ABA Booksellers' Choice Non-Fiction Book of the Year: Bulldozed: Scott Morrison's fall and Anthony Albanese's rise by Niki Savva

ABA Kids' Reading Guide Children's Book of the Year: Runt by Craig Silvey (A&U Children's)

- 2022 Winners:

ABA Nielsen Book Booksellers' Choice Fiction Book of the Year: Love & Virtue by Diana Reid (Ultimo)

ABA Booksellers' Choice Non-Fiction Book of the Year: Love Stories by Trent Dalton (Fourth Estate)

ABA Kids' Reading Guide Children's Book of the Year: Rabbit, Soldier, Angel, Thief by Katrina Nannestad (ABC Books)

- 2021 Winners:

ABA Nielsen Book Booksellers' Choice Fiction Book of the Year: The Dictionary of Lost Words by Pip Williams

ABA Booksellers' Choice Non-Fiction Book of the Year: Phosphorescence by Julia Baird (HarperCollins Australia)

ABA Kids' Reading Guide Children's Book of the Year: The Grandest Bookshop in the World by Amelia Mellor (Affirm Press)

- 2020 Winners:

ABA Nielsen Book Booksellers' Choice Fiction Book of the Year (Joint): There Was Still Love by Favel Parrett (Hachette) & The Yield by Tara June Winch (Penguin Australia)

ABA Booksellers' Choice Non-Fiction Book of the Year: See What You Made Me Do by Jess Hill (Black Inc.)

ABA Kids' Reading Guide Children's Book of the Year: Young Dark Emu by Bruce Pascoe (Magabala Books)

- 2019 Winner: Boy Swallows Universe by Trent Dalton (HarperCollins Australia)
- 2018 Winner: Nevermoor: The Trials of Morrigan Crow by Jessica Townsend (Lothian)
- 2017 Winner: The Birdman's Wife by Melissa Ashley (Affirm Press)
- 2016 Winner: Reckoning: A Memoir by Magda Szubanski (Text Publishing)
- 2015 Winner: The 52-storey Treehouse by Andy Griffiths and Terry Denton (Pan Macmillan Australia)
- 2014 Winner: Burial Rites, Hannah Kent (Hachette)
- 2013 Winner: The Light Between Oceans, M. L. Stedman (Random House)
- 2012 Winner: All That I Am, Anna Funder, (Text Publishing)
- 2011 Winner: The Happiest Refugee, Anh Doh (Allen & Unwin)
- 2010 Winner: The Kitchen Garden, Stephanie Alexander (Lantern)
- 2009 Winner: The Slap, Christos Tsiolkas (Allen & Unwin)
- 2008 Winner: Girl Stuff, Kaz Cooke (Penguin Australia)
- 2007 Winner: Salvation Creek, Susan Duncan (Random House Australia)
- 2006 Winner: The Secret River, Kate Grenville (Text)
- 2004 Winner: Joe Cinque's Consolation, Helen Garner (Picador)
- 2003 Joint Winners: Mao's Last Dancer, Li Cunxin | Death Sentence, Don Watson
- 2002 Winner: Diary of a Wombat, Jackie French & Bruce Whatley
- 2001 Winner: Dirt Music, Tim Winton (Picador)
- 2000 Winner: The Blue Day Book, Bradley Trevor Greive
- 1999 Winner: Stravinsky's Lunch, Drusilla Modjeska
- 1998 Winner: The Sound of One Hand Clapping, Richard Flanagan
- 1997 Winner Burning for Revenge, John Marsden
- 1996 Joint Winners: Night Letters, Robert Dessaix | The Cook's Companion, Stephanie Alexander
- 1995 Winner: The First Stone, Helen Garner
- 1994 Winner: The Orchard, Drusilla Modjeska

The ABA has strong links with other book industry organisations, including the Australian Publishers Association and the Australian Society of Authors and their international counterparts Booksellers New Zealand, the Booksellers Association of Great Britain and Ireland and the American Booksellers Association. ABA is a member of the International Booksellers Federation.

== See also ==
- List of booksellers' associations
