= Shallows =

1984 novel by Tim Winton

- First edition
- Author: Tim Winton
- Language: English
- Publisher: Allen & Unwin, Australia
- Publication date: 1984
- Publication place: Australia
- Media type: Paperback
- Pages: 235
- ISBN: 0-86861-793-8
- OCLC: 29006597
- Preceded by: An Open Swimmer
- Followed by: That Eye, The Sky

Shallows (1984) is a novel by Australian author Tim Winton. It won the 1984 Miles Franklin Award, and was the 1985 joint winner of Western Australian Premier's Book Award - Fiction.

Carolyn See called it "a dark masterpiece that ranks with Moby-Dick".

== Story outline ==
The novel is set in 1978 in the fictional town of Angelus, Western Australia. The town is the last remaining remnant of Australia's whaling industry and the novel details the conflicts that arise as a group of outsiders, intent on closing down the whaling industry, come to town.

== Critical reception ==
Marian Eldridge in The Canberra Times was impressed with the work: "It is a book resonant with meanings. On the surface it looks at a contemporary situation, a year-old relationship under strain as one partner becomes an active conservationist and the other an uncommitted, embarrassed observer. Whatever one decides the novel is saying, Shallows is a satisfying book."

== Awards ==
- 1984 Miles Franklin Award.
- 1985 Joint Winner Western Australian Premier's Book Award - Fiction.
