= Cement (film) =

- DVD cover
- Directed by: Adrian Pasdar
- Written by: Justin Monjo
- Produced by: D.J. Paul; Adrian Pasdar
- Starring: Chris Penn; Jeffrey Wright; Sherilyn Fenn; Anthony DeSando; Henry Czerny
- Cinematography: Geary McLeod
- Edited by: Jack Haigis
- Music by: Doug Caldwell; Paul Horrors; Anthony Vanger
- Production company: Ocelot Films Inc
- Distributed by: Lionsgate Home Entertainment
- Release dates: April 14, 2000 (WorldFest); November 20, 2001
- Running time: 95 minutes
- Country: United States
- Language: English

Cement is a 2000 American thriller crime drama film directed by Adrian Pasdar and written by Justin Monjo. The film was shot in Los Angeles, California and was Pasdar's first film as director.

== Plot ==
Los Angeles vice detectives Bill Holt and Nin have entered the gangster and drug scenes and have allied with drug kingpin Truman Rickhardt. As he tries to stop Holt, Nin narrates the events that led Holt to torture Truman's brother Sean by chaining him inside an iron box that's slowly filling with cement. Cops on the take, missing money, Holt's tempting wife Lyndel, dead police officers are implicated in the events.

== Featured cast ==
- Chris Penn as Bill Holt
- Jeffrey Wright as Nin
- Anthony DeSando as Sean Rickhart
- Sherilyn Fenn as Lyndel Holt
- Henry Czerny as Truman Rickhart
- Gregory Jbara as Fergus Rickhart
- Titus Welliver as Mo
- Yorgo Constantine as Danny
- Richard Edson as Robbo
- Kevin Jackson as Carter
- Max Martini as Mic

== Awards ==
- 2000: AngelCiti film festival: Audience Award, Adrian Pasdar, D.J. Paul
