= Dirt Music (film) =

Film based on an Australian novel

- Australian theatrical release poster
- Directed by: Gregor Jordan
- Screenplay by: Jack Thorne
- Based on: Dirt Music by Tim Winton
- Produced by: Finola Dwyer; Amanda Posey; Angie Fielder; Polly Staniford
- Starring: Garrett Hedlund; Kelly Macdonald; David Wenham
- Cinematography: Sam Chiplin
- Edited by: Pia Di Ciaula
- Music by: Craig Armstrong
- Production companies: Wildgaze Films; Aquarius Films; Cornerstone Pictures; Film4; ScreenWest
- Distributed by: Universal Pictures International; Focus Features (Australia); Blue Finch Film Releasing (United Kingdom)
- Release dates: 11 September 2019 (TIFF); 8 October 2020 (Australia)
- Running time: 104 minutes
- Countries: Australia; United Kingdom
- Box office: $483,445

Dirt Music is a 2019 romantic drama film directed by Gregor Jordan, based on the 2001 novel of the same name by award-winning Australian author Tim Winton. It stars Garrett Hedlund, Kelly Macdonald, and David Wenham.

The film premiered at the Toronto International Film Festival on 11 September 2019. It was released in Australia on 8 October 2020 by Universal Pictures.

== Premise ==
A poacher is chased through the Australian outback after his affair with a woman is discovered.

== Cast ==
- Garrett Hedlund as Luther Fox
- Kelly Macdonald as Georgie Jutland
- David Wenham as Jim Buckridge
- Julia Stone as Sal
- Ava Caryofyllis as Bird
- Aaron Pedersen as Beaver
- Chris Haywood as Warwick
- George Mason as Darkie
- Daniel Wyllie as Rusty
- Syd Brisbane as Chugger

== Production ==
It was announced in August 2018 that Garrett Hedlund and Kelly Macdonald were cast to star in the adaptation of Tim Winton's novel. In October, the supporting cast, including David Wenham, was added, with filming beginning in Kimberley, Western Australia, and would also film in Perth and Esperance.

== Reception ==
Dirt Music received generally negative reviews from critics. On Rotten Tomatoes, the film holds an approval rating of 27% based on 49 reviews, with an average rating of 4.7/10. The website's critics consensus reads: "As beautifully filmed as it is emotionally hollow, Dirt Music goes digging for romance but only buries the audience in mounds of melodrama." Film reviewer, Luke Buckmaster, referred to it as an "only intermittently engaging film".

== See also ==
- Cinema of Australia
