= Justin Monjo =

Australian actor and screenwriter

Justin Monjo (born 1963, New York) is an American screenwriter, television producer, and actor, best known for his work on Farscape.

== Early life ==
Monjo is the son of children's author F. N. Monjo III and the great-grandson of arctic furrier Ferdinand N. Monjo. He is the nephew of American diplomat John Cameron Monjo.

Monjo graduated from NIDA in 1985, alongside actresses Catherine McClements and Sonia Todd, and director Baz Luhrmann.

== Career ==
Monjo wrote Adrian Pasdar's film debut screenplay Cement and worked on Young Lions. He created the 2005 TV series The Alice with Robyn Sinclair.

His adaptation with his former NIDA teacher Nick Enright of Cloudstreet by Tim Winton enjoyed huge critical and box-office success at the Festivals of Sydney and Perth, on tour of Australia, at the Festival of Dublin, and in London.

== Filmography ==
=== As actor ===
==== Film ====
Year	Title	Role	Type
1984	One Night Stand	American Sailor	Feature film
1988	Badlands 2005	Braggs	TV film
1988	The Rainbow Warrior Conspiracy	Hendrick	TV movie
1989	The Salute of the Jugger	Dog-Boy	Feature film
1993	Official Denial	Franklin Kolbe	TV movie
1993	Desperate Journey: The Allison Wilcox Story	Bill Darden	TV movie
1993	Escape from Absolom (aka No Escape)	Technician #1	Feature film
1995	In Pursuit of Honor	Captain Geoffrey Overton	TV movie
1995	Babe	Other character voices (voice actor)	Feature film
1995	Singapore Sling: Old Flames	Dave Ruxton	TV movie
1995	Tunnel Vision	Craig Breslin	TV movie
1998	Dark City	Taxi Driver	Feature film
1998	Never Tell Me Never	Marty Hall	TV movie
1998	In the Winter Dark	Circus Man	Feature film

==== Television ====
Year	Title	Role	Type
1987	Vietnam	Tenzy	Miniseries, 2 episodes
1987	Nancy Wake	Ray	Miniseries, 1 episode
1989	Mission: Impossible	Bakunin	TV series, S1 E8: "The Pawn"
1996	The Beast	Lieutenant Henderson	Miniseries, 2 episodes
1997	Big Sky	Dave Brock	TV series, S1 E2: "Navstar"
1997	Roar	Julian	TV series, pilot episode
1998	Flipper	Calvin Frazier	TV series, S3 E3: "Swimming with Sharks"
1998	Murder Call	Roland Lacey	TV series, S2 E18: "Instrument of Death"
2005	The Cooks	TV Evangelist	TV series, S1 E12: "Honey and Wounds"

==== Stage ====
Year	Title	Role	Venue / Co.
1983	Kennedy's Children	Barman	NIDA Parade Theatre, Sydney, Royal Military College, Duntroon
1984	Holidaymakers	Sergei Basov	NIDA Theatre, Sydney
1984	Three French Farces: La Grange	Impromptu at Versailles	NIDA Theatre, Sydney
1984	Richard III	George (Duke of Clarence) / Ratcliff / Cardinal Bourchier / Second Citizen	NIDA Theatre, Sydney
1985	A Dream Play	Actor	NIDA Theatre, Sydney
1985	Funeral Games	Actor	NIDA Theatre, Sydney
1985	The Greeks Play 1 The War	Actor	NIDA Theatre, Sydney
1986	She Stoops to Conquer	Tony Lumpkin	Playhouse, Melbourne with MTC
1987	The Island	Actor	St John's Hall, Sydney
1987	Pericles	Actor	Wharf Theatre with STC
1987	A Lie of the Mind	Actor	Belvoir Street Theatre, Sydney
1989	The Conquest of the South Pole	Actor	Belvoir Street Theatre, Sydney
1990	The Emigrants	Actor	Belvoir Street Theatre, Sydney with Auto Da Fe Theatre
1993	Fortune	Actor	Stables Theatre, Sydney with Griffin Theatre Company
1996	A View from the Bridge	Marco	Belvoir Street Theatre, Sydney
	Romeo is Bleeding		Australia & United States
	The Year I Started Believing in Vietnamese Fortune Tellers		

=== As writer/producer ===
==== Film ====
Year	Title	Role	Type
2000	Cement	Screenplay	Film
2004	The Alice	Writer	TV film
2010	Roadman	Script editor	Film
2012	Bait 3D	Additional writing	Feature film
2013	The Turning	Screenplay	Anthology film, segment: "Sand"
2015	Spear	Co-writer	Feature film
2017	Jungle	Screenplay	Feature film
2018	KinShip	Creative consultant	Short film
2019	Storm Boy	Screenplay	Feature film
2022	Everything In Between	Creative consultant	Film

==== Television ====
Year	Title	Role	Type
1998–99	Wildside	Writer	TV series, 2 episodes
1999–2003	Farscape	Writer	TV series, 14 episodes
2000	Farscape	Creative consultant	TV series, 15 episodes
2002	Young Lions	Writer	TV series, 2 episodes
2005–06	The Alice	Co-creator	TV series, 22 episodes
2008	The Strip	Writer	TV series, S1 E9: "House of Ill Repute"
2008–09	Rush	Writer	TV series, S1-2, 4 episodes
2013	Paper Giants: Magazine Wars	Writer	Miniseries, 2 episodes
2013	Serangoon Road	Writer	TV series, S1 E7: "My Girl"
2014	Never Tear Us Apart: The Untold Story of INXS	Writer	Miniseries, 2 episodes
2014	The Code	Writer	TV series, S1 E5
2015	Catching Milat	Writer	Miniseries, 2 episodes
2015	Peter Allen: Not the Boy Next Door	Writer	Miniseries, S1 E1
2016	Tomorrow, When the War Began	Writer	Miniseries, S1 E6
2016	Brock	Writer	Miniseries, S1 E1
2016–17	The Secret Daughter	Creator	TV series, 12 episodes
2018	Underbelly Files: Chopper	Writer	Miniseries, 2 episodes
2022	Bali 2002	Writer	Miniseries, 2 episodes
2023	The Claremont Murders	Writer	Miniseries, 2 episodes

==== Stage ====
Year	Title	Role	Venue / Co.
1994	That Eye, The Sky	Adaptor	Stanley Palmer Cultural Centre, Sydney, Playhouse, Melbourne, Playhouse, Perth, Space Theatre, Adelaide with Burning House Theatre Company for Sydney Festival
1998; 1999; 2001; 2002; 2006	Cloudstreet	Adaptor	Berth 9, Darling Harbour, Sydney, Fremantle Dock, Playhouse, Adelaide, Malthouse Theatre, Melbourne, Theatre Royal, Sydney, Playhouse, Brisbane, Olivier Theatre, London, Harvey Lichtenstein Theater, New York, Darwin Entertainment Centre, University of Melbourne
2005; 2006	Ray's Tempest	Scriptwriter	Belvoir Street Theatre, Sydney, Fairfax Studio, Melbourne with MTC
2016; 2018	That Eye, The Sky	Adaptor	New Theatre, Sydney, Dunstan Playhouse, Adelaide
2019	Cloudstreet	Adaptor	Malthouse Theatre, Melbourne
