= Blueback (novel) =

Novel by Tim Winton

- First edition (publ. Pan Macmillan)
- Author: Tim Winton
- Publication date: March 1, 1998
- Pages: 151pp
- ISBN: 978-0-684-84565-4

Blueback is a short novel by the Australian author Tim Winton. First published in 1997, it has since been translated into Italian, Dutch and Japanese.

== Background ==
Winton explained,

I don't know whether books like Blueback make a difference, but in an innocent way, it's discussing these things - we have been taking from the sea and the land for so long, it's time for us to give something back. "I feel very specifically that I benefited from growing up where I did, where so much revolved around the sea - in a way, it was a gift and I owe it something. If the sea is ultimately where we come from, and it seems we did, then it's our source, our ancestral life and we are obliged to nourish it.

== Plot ==
Abel Jackson is a young boy who lives near the sea with his mother, Dora, at a wild isolated bay, Longboat Bay, which is surrounded by national park. He has been swimming and diving for as long as he can remember, and enjoys helping his mother dive for abalone.

During one such dive, Abel encounters "Blueback", a large blue groper fish, below the surface at Robber's Head. His mother explains that such a fish can grow that large because it might live for perhaps a hundred years. When Blueback is later threatened by a commercial abalone fisherman who won't adhere to the rules, Abel and his mother take matters into their own hands.

As the years pass, developers attempt to interest Abel's mother in selling the property, that has been owned by her family for generations. She refuses. Then, while Abel is away, first at high school and later at university, Dora Jackson writes many letters to people. Finally she is able to have Longboat Bay declared a marine reserve, in order to protect it and the marine species that live there.

Abel becomes a marine biologist, gets married, and works overseas in many places. But eventually he returns to his old place at Longboat Bay, when his mother is an old woman.

== Reception ==
=== Reviews ===
Penguin Books states: "Blueback is an achingly beautiful story about family, belonging, and living a life in tune with the environment, from Tim Winton, one of Australia's best-loved authors."

In a brief review published as part of a round-up of recently published books, Michelle Hamer in The Sydney Morning Herald commented: "Winton doesn't mess around in this beautifully crafted text. He has a story to tell and wades right in, conjuring up delightful imagery along the way."

Alexa Dretzke reviewed,

We have a boy who loves the sea. It is his boy and part of his family's past. He loves a big, old fish that swims with him and he loves his mother, who taught him the ways of the sea and how to respect Winton's homage to a landscape he hopes will prevail. This is a superb modern Australian classic for every child and adult.

'Winton ... convince[s] us of the preciousness of our oceans not through lectures but through his characters' steady wonder.' New York Times

=== Awards ===
- 1998 Bolinda Audio Book Awards
- 1998 Wilderness Society Environment Award
- 1999 WAYRBA Hoffman Award for Young Readers

== Adaptations ==
In 2005, Blueback adapted into a magic mike show by Spare Parts Puppet Theatre, located in Fremantle staged its Premier performance. It then staged performances in Regional Schools in 2008, 2009 and 2010. The play then returned to Fremantle in 2011, and performed at the Mandurah Performing Arts Theatre in 2012, before returning to Fremantle again in 2015. There was also a Regional Schools Tour in 2015.

In 2021, Blueback was adapted into an Australian feature film written and directed by Robert Connolly, was released in Australia on 1 January 2023. It stars Mia Wasikowska, Radha Mitchell, Erik Thomson, Eddie Baroo and Eric Bana.

== Notes ==
- An excerpt from the novel was published in The Age in September 1997.
