= Dirt Music =

Novel by Tim Winton

- First edition cover
- Author: Tim Winton
- Language: English
- Publisher: Picador
- Publication date: 2001
- Publication place: Australia
- Pages: 465
- ISBN: 0-330-36323-9
- OCLC: 48561064
- Dewey Decimal: 823/.914 22
- LC Class: PR9619.3.W585 D57 2001

Dirt Music is a 2001 novel by Tim Winton. A 2002 Man Booker Prize shortlisted novel and winner of the 2002 Miles Franklin Award, it has been translated into Russian, French, German, Dutch, and Swedish. The harsh, unyielding climate of Western Australia dominates the actions and events of this thriller.

== Plot summary ==
Georgie, the heroine of the book, becomes fascinated while watching a stranger attempting to poach fish in an area where nobody can maintain secrets for very long. Disillusioned with her relationship with the local fisherman legend Jim Buckridge, she contrives a meeting with the stranger and soon passion runs out of control between two bruised and emotionally fragile people.

The secret quickly becomes impossible to hide, and Jim wants revenge, whilst the poacher hikes north via Wittenoom (out of respect for his father who died of mesothelioma in the town) and Broome, to an island off the remote coast of Kimberley, beyond Kununurra, so as to escape a confrontation. His subsequent struggles to survive in the hostile environment, knowing that he must try to literally cover his tracks, give this book its gripping denouement.

== Reviews ==
A review by Leigh Mytton on the BBC describes Winton's characterisation as "incisive" that he "intersperses raw and vernacular language with lyrical passages ... Throughout the novel, it is the indomitable force of nature that pervades."

Paul Daley in The Sydney Morning Herald wrote, "Dirt Music is an Australian novel. But it's not gentle or tame and there's nothing quaint about it. Family dysfunction, loneliness and alcoholism in Winton's part of the world - the harsh, beautiful West Australian coast - are among the elements of this raw, tender and disquieting love story."

Jules Smith, for the British Council, writes that in Dirt Music Tim Winton, "brings his human and environmental themes together in ways that are always intensely realized and touching".

== Awards ==
- 2001 Western Australian Premier's Book Award Premier's Prize - Book of Year
- 2001 Western Australian Premier's Book Award Premier's Prize - Fiction
- 2001 Good Reading Award, 2001
- 2002 Australian Booksellers Association Book of the Year Award
- 2002 Man Booker Prize for Fiction (shortlist)
- 2002 Miles Franklin Award
- 2002 New South Wales Premier's Literary Award, Christina Stead Prize for Fiction
- 2002 Kiriyama Pacific Rim Book Prize, Fiction, 2002 – shortlist

== Album ==
Tim Winton and Lucky Oceans chose the music for the book's "soundtrack". Released in CD form in Australia in 2001, the two disc set includes both bluegrass and classical music. The music is embodied by a quote from the book: "Anything you could play on a verandah. You know, without electricity. Dirt music."

== Film adaptation ==
A film adaptation, Dirt Music, directed by Gregor Jordan, was released in September 2019. It featured Kelly Macdonald and Garrett Hedlund in the lead roles.

A proposed adaptation was in development as early as 2009, with Phillip Noyce as the prospective director. In 2014, Noyce admitted that development had ceased, because "I could never get a script that I thought captured the poetry of the novel... A poetic novel is ... difficult to translate into a movie. It’s a project I’ll come back to I’m sure in the future."
