= Splendour (play) =

Welsh play

Splendour is a play by Welsh playwright and screenwriter Abi Morgan. It was first performed at the Edinburgh festival at the Traverse Theatre in 2000 in a production by Paines Plough.

The play runs for approximately 95 minutes with no intermission.

== Production history ==
Year	City	Theatre	Directed by	Micheleine	Kathryn	Gilma	Genevieve
2000	Edinburgh (UK)	Traverse Theatre	Vicky Featherstone	Mary Cunningham	Faith Flint	Eileen Walsh	Myra McFadyen
2015	London (UK)	Donmar Warehouse	Robert Hastie	Sinéad Cusack	Genevieve O’Reilly	Zawe Ashton	Michelle Fairley
2017	Berkeley (US)	Aurora Theatre	Barbara Damashek	Lorri Holt	Denmo Ibrahim	Sam Jackson	Mia Tagano
