= Minimum of Two =

Book by Tim Winton

First edition (publ. McPhee Gribble/Penguin)

Minimum Of Two is the second collection of short stories by multi award-winning Australian writer Tim Winton.

It is an anthology which consists of 14 short stories, seven of which feature the characters Jerra, Rachel and Sam Nilsam:

- Forest Winter*
- No Memory Comes
- Gravity*
- The Water was Dark
- Nilsam's Friend*
- Minimum of Two
- Distant Lands
- Laps
- Bay of Angels*
- The Strong One*
- Holding
- More*
- Death Belongs to the Dead, His Father Told Him, and Sadness to the Sad
- Blood and Water*

Stories marked with * indicate stories which feature the recurring characters Jerra, Rachel and Sam Nilsam.

Although many of the stories do not contain references to any particular setting, it is most likely that all stories in the anthology are set in Perth, Western Australia, around the late (post-World War II) 20th century.

Most of the stories deal with relationships which are placed under hardship and stress, it also deals with the theme of men and masculinity. They are written in a minimalist style typical of Tim Winton.

Perhaps the most prominent theme throughout all the stories is not necessarily the adversity these people are placed under, but the way in which they react to the problems confronting them. For example, Jerra Nilsam doesn't try to deal with his problems at all; preferring to accept his circumstances and be depressed about it. Jerra, a failed rock musician, chose marriage, and is now the stay at home carer who wonders where the music, happiness, and money of his earlier life has gone. Rachel doesn't address the cause of her problems, but moves on from them, determined to better herself with education and a career. Jerra's father accepts his illness (cancer), but rather than wallowing in it, decides to make the most of his remaining days. The unnamed boy in "No Memory Comes" uses denial to deal with his problems, assuring himself that things are not changing, and that 'he doesn't mind' when things do. Queenie Cookson is possibly the most successful, going back to her old town to confront her past demons, deal with them, and then be able to move on in her life.

In the title story Minimum of two Madigan, rather than dealing with the actual problems arising from his wife's rape, decides to deal with the cause, killing her rapist once he is released from prison.

Many of the stories mentioned in this book relate to two common characters found throughout the book, Jerra and Rachel Nilsam. Rachel and Jerra are two very separated people who learn to live together through the birth of their son Sam. Sam provides the two with a connection which ultimately always pulls them through their everyday and life struggles.

Since 2005, the anthology has been included in the VCE reading list, as an option for study by Year 11 and 12 English Students.

== Awards ==
- 1988 Winner Western Australian Premier's Book Award - Fiction
