= An Open Swimmer =

Novel by Tim Winton

- First edition (publ. Allen & Unwin)
- Author: Tim Winton
- Language: English
- Publisher: Allen & Unwin, Australia
- Publication date: 1982
- Publication place: Australia
- Media type: [hardcover]
- Pages: 173pp
- ISBN: 0868612200
- Preceded by: –
- Followed by: Shallows

An Open Swimmer is the first novel by Australian author, Tim Winton. Winton wrote this novel while attending a creative writing course at Curtin University. In 1981, it won The Australian/Vogel Literary Award, and kick-started Winton's writing career.

== Plot summary ==
Set in three distinct parts, An Open Swimmer is a 'coming of age' novel; it details the late-teen life of a young man named Jerra Nilsam. A considerable part of the novel describes the camping trip taken by Jerra and his childhood friend, Sean. On this camping trip, Jerra and Sean meet an old man living in a shack on the beach near their camp site. As the story progresses, it becomes apparent that the old man had murdered his wife in a similar shack on a nearby beach by burning it down with her inside. Many sub-plots are scattered throughout this book in the form of spontaneous paragraphs and dialogues between unnamed characters (but presumably one of them is Jerra).

In the end, after having returned home and parted ways with Sean, Jerra returns to the camping site alone. While Jerra is sleeping in his van, there is a violent storm which results in a large tree falling on the Kombi. Jerra awakes in the old man's hut, the storm having passed and having been saved by the old man. In the final paragraph, Jerra returns to his Kombi, opens the fuel tank and drops a match into it before running.

== Critical reception ==
Ralph Elliott, in The Canberra Times, was in no doubt about the talent on display in this novel: "An Open Swimmer is certainly an impressive novel to come from one who has just finished a course in Creative Writing, a seed-bed not always regarded as producing the best literary fruit. But where there is talent, such a course may well enhance it, and Winton's talent is unquestionable."

== Publication history ==
It was first published by Allen and Unwin in 1982, and was subsequently a paperback in Pan, a Picador edition in 1987 a large print book in 1991 a McPhee Gribble edition in 1993 an Australian Penguin in 1998 and a Bolinda audio book in 2007

== Awards ==
1981 Australian Vogel National Literary Award
