= Blueback (film) =

2022 Australian drama film

- Teaser poster
- Directed by: Robert Connolly
- Screenplay by: Robert Connolly; Tim Winton
- Based on: Blueback by Tim Winton
- Produced by: Liz Kearney; James Grandison; Robert Connolly
- Starring: Mia Wasikowska; Radha Mitchell; Ilsa Fogg; Eric Bana
- Cinematography: Andrew Commis; Rick Rifici
- Edited by: Nick Meyers
- Music by: Nigel Westlake
- Production companies: Screen Australia; Screenwest; West Australian Regional Film Fund; Film Victoria; HanWay Films; Pick Up Truck Pictures; Soundfirm; Arenamedia
- Distributed by: Roadshow Films
- Release dates: 10 September 2022 (TIFF); 1 January 2023 (Australia)
- Running time: 103 minutes
- Country: Australia
- Language: English

Blueback is a 2022 Australian drama film directed by Robert Connolly, from a screenplay written by Connolly and Tim Winton, based on Winton's 1997 novel of the same name. The film centres on a young girl who befriends a wild blue groper while diving, and becomes a passionate activist for protecting the ecosystem of Australia's coral reefs from destruction. It stars Mia Wasikowska, Radha Mitchell, Ilsa Fogg, Liz Alexander, Ariel Donoghue, Clarence Ryan, Pedrea Jackson, Erik Thomson, Eddie Baroo and Eric Bana.

The film premiered at the 2022 Toronto International Film Festival on 10 September 2022, and had its theatrical release in Australia on 1 January 2023.

At the 2023 ARIA Music Awards, the soundtrack was nominated for ARIA Award for Best Original Soundtrack, Cast or Show Album.

== Cast ==
- Mia Wasikowska as Abby Jackson
  - Ilsa Fogg as teenage Abby
  - Ariel Donoghue as young Abby
- Radha Mitchell as Dora Jackson
  - Liz Alexander as older Dora
- Clarence Ryan as Briggs
  - Pedrea Jackson as teenage Briggs
- Erik Thomson as Costello
- Eddie Baroo as Merv
- Eric Bana as 'Mad' Macka
- Albert Mwangi as Gitundu
- Dalip Sondhi as Mr. Carlisle
- Nick Paranamos as Macka's son

== Production ==
In February 2021, a film adaptation of Blueback by Tim Winton was announced to be moving forward, with Robert Connolly announced to be directing, after years of development. Mia Wasikowska, Eric Bana and Radha Mitchell were set to star in the film, with Bana reteaming with Connolly after the Australian success of The Dry. The film was packaged and pitched for distributors in the film market at the 71st Berlin International Film Festival.

The film officially began principal photography on 22 March 2021, in Western Australia.

== Release ==
Blueback had its world premiere at the 2022 Toronto International Film Festival on 10 September 2022. It was theatrically released in Australia by Roadshow Films on 1 January 2023.

Its Australian premiere occurred on 22 November 2022 at the opening of the Somerville Film festival in collaboration with the 2023 Perth Festival.

The film was released on DVD and Blu-ray by Roadshow Entertainment on 29 March 2023.

== Reception ==
On the review aggregator website Rotten Tomatoes, the film has an approval rating of 72% based on 43 reviews, with an average rating of 6/10. The website's consensus reads, "While it may be narratively slight and somewhat preachy, Blueback is a beautifully filmed family drama with an ecologically conscious message." On Metacritic, it has a weighted average score of 59 out of 100 based on 11 critics, indicating "mixed or average reviews".

The soundtrack was nominated for Best Independent Classical Album or EP at the 2023 AIR Awards.

== See also ==
- Cinema of Australia
