= The Turning (short story collection) =

2004 collection of short stories by Tim Winton

- First edition
- Author: Tim Winton
- Cover artist: australianpicturelibrary.com
- Language: English
- Publisher: Picador
- Publication date: 2004
- Publication place: Australia
- Media type: Print
- Pages: 317
- ISBN: 0-330-43830-1

The Turning is a collection of short stories by Australian author Tim Winton published in 2004.

== Contents ==
Many of the 17 short stories included interweave in their respective narratives. The story is set in a small Western Australian town and is about all different kinds of "turnings", be they in people, situations, surprises, accidents, relationships, and even the turning of time.

These turnings come at crucial times in the characters' lives. They are doomed and unhappy people, and though the turning may not change their lives we see their humanity even if just for a moment.

This multi award-winning collection of short stories is used commonly in the curriculum of 3/AB English students in Western Australia.

The stories are:

1. "Big World"
2. "Abbreviation"
3. "Aquifer"
4. "Damaged Goods"
5. "Small Mercies"
6. "On Her Knees"
7. "Cockleshell"
8. "The Turning"
9. "Sand"
10. "Family"
11. "Long, Clear View"
12. "Reunion"
13. "Commission"
14. "Fog"
15. "Boner McPharlin's Moll"
16. "Immunity"
17. "Defender"

== Reviews ==
One review summarised The Turning as, "People struggle against the weight of their own history and try to reconcile themselves to their place in the world. With extraordinary insight and tenderness, Winton explores the demons and frailties of ordinary people whose lives are not what they had hoped."

Though The Turning may be difficult to read we are emotionally captured by "these stunted, unhappy, and sometimes doomed lives, but Winton’s prose is transcendent." The stories show us that when life is at its lowest there is always, "some element of beauty."

The Boston Globe wrote, "The writing is frankly brilliant . . . Winton shows us how startling ordinary life is. And he does it in a way that's more amazing than if he had shown a ghost shimmering on the page." The Times wrote, "'Winton is a poet of baffled souls . . . To read him is to be reminded not just of the possibilities of fiction but of the human heart. "

== Adaptations ==
=== Play ===
The Turning was developed as a play for the 2008 Perth International Arts Festival. The Western Edge Theatre Projects worked together with the Perth Theatre Company and Bill McCluskey on the production.

=== Film ===
In 2013, The Turning was premiered as a film at the Melbourne International Film Festival. The architect of the project was Robert Connolly, and the result was that the 18 stories in the collection were each filmed featuring different actors, directors and collaborators.

== Awards and nominations ==
- 2004 Colin Roderick Award, 2004 – joint winner
- 2005 Queensland Premier's Literary Awards, Best Fiction Book
- 2005 New South Wales Premier's Literary Awards, Christina Stead Prize for Fiction
- 2005 Inaugural Frank O'Connor International Short Story Award – shortlisted
- 2005 Commonwealth Writers Prize, South East Asia and South Pacific Region, Best Book – commended,
