= The Riders =

Novel by Tim Winton

- First edition cover
- Author: Tim Winton
- Cover artist: Mary Callahan
- Language: English
- Genre: Fiction
- Publisher: Macmillan
- Publication date: 1994
- Publication place: Australia
- Media type: Print (Cloth)
- Pages: 377
- ISBN: 978-0-7329-0790-7
- OCLC: 32698948
- Dewey Decimal: 823 20
- LC Class: PR9619.3.W585 R5 1994

The Riders (1994) is a novel by Australian author Tim Winton published in 1994. It was shortlisted for the Booker Prize in 1995.

== Premise ==
The Riders tells the story of an Australian man, Fred Scully, and his seven-year-old daughter Billie. Scully, as he is known, and his wife, Jennifer, have planned to move from Australia to a cottage they have purchased in Ireland. His wife and daughter are due to arrive in Ireland, but at the airport only Billie arrives, traumatised and unable to tell her father what has happened or why her mother put her on the plane alone. The story follows Scully and Billie as they travel around Europe retracing the steps of their previous travel, trying to find Jennifer and work out why she left them.

The novel is set in December 1987. It refers to some events that actually occurred in Australia in that month: the resignation of the longest-serving premier of Queensland, Joh Bjelke-Petersen (1 December), and the Queen Street massacre (8 December).

== Themes ==
Iain Grandage, who wrote the music for adaptation of The Riders as an opera, described the novel as follows: "At its heart, The Riders is about the nature of love. It deals with questions of how well we can truly know someone; how well we can truly know ourselves."

== Reviews ==
A review in Kirkus Reviews stated that, "Emotions, character, and intellect so perfectly calibrated that a modest story of love betrayed becomes, in Winton's hands, a minor masterpiece."

Publishers Weekly gave it a starred review, describing the novel as a 'suspense thriller" and a "gut-wrenching love story" while praising Winton's descriptions of landscapes, the energy of his prose and calling Winton "stunning".

== Adaptations ==
=== Opera ===
An opera based on the novel, with libretto by Alison Croggon and music by Iain Grandage, was premiered in Melbourne in September 2014.

=== Film ===
The rights to the novel were secured by Susie Brooks-Smith in 2000. In 2004, Robert Fox signed on as producer. It was announced in 2012 that Sam Worthington was cast in the lead role, with Timothy Spall and Charles Dance in supporting roles. Brooks-Smith had adapted the screenplay with Michael Hirst and Francesca Brill, and Robert Connolly would direct. It was later revealed that filming would soon begin in February 2013 in Korčula and Budapest, with a planned release date for February 2014, but the project did not proceed. In February 2014, Hans Fabian Wullenweber was announced to replace Connolly as director, and Ronan Keating, Luke Hemsworth, and Mark Strong were all added to the cast, with Spall being the only original actor reported. Filming was set to begin in Dublin later that year. However, just a couple of months later, Jahmil X.T. Qubeka was announced as the new director, and an entirely new cast consisting of Liam McIntyre, Pixie Davies, and Richard E. Grant were all set to appear. Pre-production was planned begin on May 29, 2012, with Umedia funding.

In 2018, it was reported that David Kajganich would adapt the novel and brought the film rights to Ridley Scott to produce through his Scott Free Productions company. In 2025, Brad Pitt signed on to star with Edward Berger directing from a screenplay by Kajganich. A24 would finance and distribute the film, with filming commencing early 2026.

== Awards ==
- 1995 Booker Prize for Fiction (shortlist)
- 1995 Commonwealth Writers Prize (South East Asia and South Pacific Region, Best Book)
