= That Eye, the Sky =

1986 novel by Tim Winton and 1994 Australian film

First edition (publ. McPhee Gribble)

That Eye, the Sky is a 1986 novel by Australian author Tim Winton. It follows the young protagonist Morton 'Ort' Flack, as he struggles to cope with life in a small country town after his father is paralysed in a serious car accident. After his father's accident, Ort is forced to step up and become the 'Man' of an increasingly complicated household. The situation becomes all the more convoluted with the introduction of the mysterious Henry Warburton, a dubious figure who says he has come to help. The story explores the theme of coming of age, and the complicated role religion plays in rural Australian life.

== Reviews ==
The Publishers Weekly said of the book, "The wrenching story... proves love like Ort's can prevail against hell itself"

The Los Angeles Times writes that, "The great strength of the novel is in the way the grotesque contrasts and parallels in human life are spread out, examined and accepted."

== Film adaptations ==
That Eye, the Sky
- Directed by: John Ruane
- Starring: Jamie Croft; Lisa Harrow
- Release date: 1994
- Country: Australia
- Language: English
- Box office: A$53,100 (Australia)

The film adaptation was directed by John Ruane and released in 1994.

Ruane later said:

I think the mistake I made with That Eye, the Sky is not to have more humour in it, because the book had a lot of humour. But, unfortunately, with the novel being written in the first person, a lot of the humour comes from the little boy interpreting the events and the situations he finds himself in and that he observes. So we are party to his sense of humour via his inner thoughts. When you pull that away, you have to come up with an orthodox third person approach. I really wish we had come up with more humour.

The film was made by the company of Fred Schepisi who later claimed the film was bad:

Because the director didn't know what he was doing or what side he was on. You've got to take a side. He went on an exploration. An exploration is all right but you've got to do it from a point of view.

Actor Peter Coyote stated:

That Eye, the Sky was masterfully made into a really lovely film by the director, but the producer abandoned them during the final edit, which resulted in a studio hack taking it over, cutting 40 minutes out and making it completely impenetrable. They blamed the director.

=== Cast ===
- Peter Coyote as Henry Warburton
- Jamie Croft as Morton 'Ort' Flack
- Lisa Harrow as Alice Flack
- Amanda Douge as Tegwyn Flack
- Mark Fairall as Sam Flack
- Alethea McGrath as Grammar Flack
- Paul Sonkkila as Mr Cherry
- Louise Siversen as Mrs Cherry
- Jim Daly as Lawrence Wingham

== Play ==
The book was adapted by Richard Roxburgh and Justin Monjo into the play That Eye, The Sky (by Justin Monjo, Richard Roxburgh, and Tim Winton) produced by Burning House Theatre Company, at Darlinghurst, Sydney, Australia (6 January – 6 February 1994) and Playhouse Theatre, Melbourne (13 – 15 October 1994). There was a later production at the New Theatre, 15 March to 16 April 2016. A review of the play described it as "...a dark and mysterious play anchored by a cast at the top of their game .. not an emotionally engaging play, but it is an interesting one".

=== Original cast ===
- Richard Roxburgh as Henry Warburton
- David Wenham as Morton 'Ort' Flack
- Rachel Szalay as Alice Flack
- Susan Prior as Tegwyn Flack
- Tom Lycos as Sam Flack
- Alan Flower
- Andrew Gilbert
- Celia Ireland
- Steve Rodgers
- Hugo Weaving
