= In the Winter Dark =

Novel by Tim Winton

- First edition (publ. McPhee Gribble)
- Author: Tim Winton
- Published: 1988 (McPhee Gribble)
- Media type: Hardcover
- Pages: 132
- ISBN: 0-86914-045-0

In The Winter Dark is a 1988 novel by Australian author Tim Winton.

== Synopsis ==
The setting is a valley called the Sink, which is isolated and surrounded by forest. The people who come there are lonely, have troubles or are drawn by the land. The solitude is disturbed by a mysterious creature which kills livestock and exposes the hidden fears in everyone.

== Reviews ==
As reviewed at LibraryThing the theme of the book is, "the way you can't escape the past. Whatever you've done will come out. 'If only we hadn't so many things to hide, so many opportunities for fear to get us.'" The thing that is menacing the characters isn't external, it is within themselves. The book is suspenseful, ominous, intimate and claustrophobic.

The Independent on Sunday wrote that, 'Tim Winton's raw and vibrant language makes the senses jump... concentrated, passionate, invigorating writing'. The Washington Post calls the book, 'A major work by anyone's standards... mysterious, painful and beautiful'.

== Film ==
In 1998, a feature film adaptation of In the Winter Dark was released.
