= Tim Winton =

Australian writer (born 1960)

Tim Winton AO
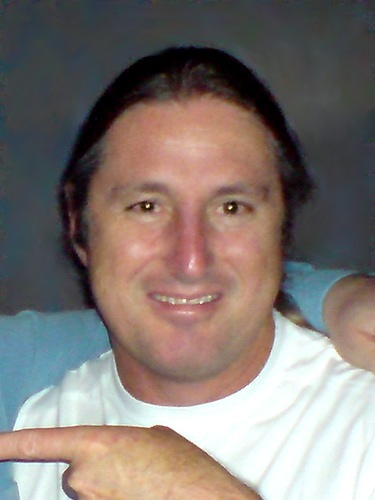
- Winton at the launch of Breath in London, 2008
- Born: Timothy John Winton; 4 August 1960 (age 66); Subiaco, Western Australia, Australia
- Occupation: Novelist
- Writing career
- Period: 1982–present
- Genres: Literature, children's, non-fiction, short story
- Notable works: Cloudstreet (1991); Dirt Music (2001); Breath (2009); Juice (2024); Lockie Leonard trilogy
- Notable awards: Miles Franklin; 1984, 1992, 2002, 2009

Timothy John Winton AO (born 4 August 1960) is an Australian writer and environmental activist. He has written novels, children's books, non-fiction books and short stories.

His most well-known novel, and the one that launched his career, was Cloudstreet, in 1991. He is also known for the novels Dirt Music (2001) and Breath (2009), as well as collections of short fiction, such as The Turning (2004), and several works of children's and young adult fiction, including Lockie Leonard, Human Torpedo. His latest novel is the 2024 climate fiction novel Juice. Many of his novels and stories have been adapted for stage and screen, and have been translated into many languages. Winton has also written some non-fiction works, including his 2016 memoir The Boy Behind the Curtain.

Winton is actively involved in the Australian environmental movement, and has roles in a number of conservation organisations. A new species of fish, Winton's grunter, was named after him after its discovery was announced in 2016. A three-part series written and narrated by him, called Ningaloo Nyinggulu, aired on ABC Television in 2023.

In 1997, he was named a Living Treasure by the National Trust of Australia, and, among many other awards, has won the Miles Franklin Award four times. He was made an Officer of the Order of Australia (AO) in 2023.

== Early life and education ==
Timothy John Winton was born on 4 August 1960 in Subiaco, an inner western suburb of Perth, Western Australia. He grew up in the northern Perth suburb of Karrinyup, before he moved with his family to the regional city of Albany at the age of 12.

He studied at the Western Australian Institute of Technology (now Curtin University), graduating with a Bachelor of Arts majoring in English in 1980, followed by a Graduate Diploma in English in 1981.

== Career ==
=== Writing ===
While still a student, Winton wrote his first novel, An Open Swimmer, which won The Australian/Vogel Literary Award in 1981, launching his writing career. He has stated that he wrote "the best part of three books while at university".

His second book, Shallows, won the Miles Franklin Award in 1984. Winton published Cloudstreet in 1991, which properly established his writing career. In October 2026, Cloudstreet topped ABC Radio National's list of Australia's 100 best books, based on more than 280,000 votes.

On the publication of Dirt Music, he collaborated with broadcaster Lucky Oceans to produce a compilation CD, Dirt Music – Music for a Novel, released in 2001.

He has continued to publish fiction, plays and non-fiction material.

=== Style and themes ===
Winton draws his prime inspiration from landscape and place, mostly coastal Western Australia. In a 2008 interview about his 2009 novel Breath, he said: "The place comes first. If the place isn't interesting to me then I can't feel it. I can't feel any people in it. I can't feel what the people are on about or likely to get up to". In an interview about his 2019 novel The Shepherd's Hut, he repeated: "The place comes first, as it always does, and the landscape determines the parameters of the story; it throws the people up (one way or another) and they're what and who I have to work with. I guess by now I'm used to submitting to the environmental logic underpinning it all. The figures literally emerge from the landscape".

Winton's works often include underlying themes of violence, desire and belonging. Breath is about risks that young people take, and the sea's role in soothing the spirit and emotions as well as having the potential to be dangerous. The sea and surfing are often present in his novels, and he also employs a technique which he calls "character overlaps", in which the same character turns up in different stories or novels.

=== Environmental advocacy ===
==== In his writing ====
Winton has always featured the environment and the Australian landscape in his writings.

His 2024 climate fiction novel Juice has been called "a potent vision of the future that points a finger at the complacency of the present", as it takes a look at the impact of climate change.

==== Organisations ====
Winton is actively involved in the Australian environmental movement. He has roles in a number of conservation organisations, in particular, the Australian Marine Conservation Society. He was vice-president of the WA branch from 1998, and has been a national patron since 2006. He has been involved in many of their campaigns, notably their work in raising awareness about sustainable seafood consumption in 2008, a campaign against shark finning in 2008, and the Protect Ningaloo campaign, since 2018.

In March 2017, Winton was named inaugural patron of the newly established Native Australian Animals Trust, based at the University of Melbourne's School of BioSciences The trust was established to help research and teaching about native animals and their environment.

Other roles in conservation organisations have included:

- Advocate, Environmental Defenders Office, current as of 2023
- Advocate, Australian Wildlife Conservancy, since 2001
- Patron, Murujuga World Heritage Summit, 2018
- Patron, Stop the Toad Foundation, 2005–2010
- Advocate, Save Ningaloo Reef, 2000–2003
- Advocate and co-founder, "Protect Ningaloo"
- Patron, Jubilee Australia

==== Television ====
In 2023, ABC Television released a three-part documentary series called Ningaloo Nyinggulu, about the Ningaloo reef on the north-western coast of Western Australia. The series was written and narrated by Winton, and produced by Artemis Media and Matter of Factual. It was nominated for an AACTA Award for Best Documentary or Factual Program, and won Innovation Award for Television in the Western Australia Screen Culture Awards as well as Best Natural History or Wildlife program at the Asian TV Awards in Ho Chi Minh City. It is available for viewing on ABC iview.

== Recognition and honours ==
Winton's books have been well reviewed by critics and many have been shortlisted for or won awards. Several novels and short stories have been adapted for stage and screen. All his books are still in print and have been published in many different languages. His work has also been successfully adapted for stage, screen and radio. He won the Miles Franklin Award a record four times: for Shallows (1984), Cloudstreet (1992), Dirt Music (2002) and Breath (2009).

Winton was named a Living Treasure by the National Trust in 1997, and was in January 2001 was awarded the Centenary Medal "service to Australian society and literature". In 1999, he received a Friends of the National Library of Australia Celebration Award.

In 2003, Winton was awarded the inaugural Australian Society of Authors (ASA) Medal in recognition for his work in the campaign to save the Ningaloo reef. In 2006, he was included in The Bulletin's "100 Most Influential Australians". In 2009, his alma mater Curtin University named a lecture theatre in his honour.

In 2016, it was announced that one of 20 recently discovered species of fish from the Kimberley region would be named after him. It was officially named "Winton's grunter", or Hannia wintoni, in 2020. The fish is a 25-centimetre-long grunter found in a Prince Regent River tributary.

Winton was appointed as an Officer of the Order of Australia in the 2023 King's Birthday Honours for "distinguished service to literature as an author and novelist, to conservation, and to environmental advocacy". In the same year, he was awarded the ABIA Lloyd O'Neil Award for outstanding service to the Australian book industry.

In 2024, Winton was the subject of a painted portrait by Sydney-based artist Laura Jones, which won the Archibald Prize that year. Having an interest in how humans interact with their environment and being an admirer of Winton, she was inspired to paint him after watching his 2023 TV documentary Ningaloo Nyinggulu and by his speech urging artists to use their work to critique the lack of action by governments on climate change,

== Tim Winton Young Writers Award (1992–2022) ==
The Tim Winton Young Writers Award was launched in 1992 and thence sponsored annually by the City of Subiaco until 2022. Winton was patron of the award, and handed out the awards at a ceremony.

The award recognised young writers in the Perth metropolitan area, and is open to short-story writers of primary school and secondary school age. Three compilations have been published: Destination Unknown (2001) Life Bytes (2002), and Hatched: Celebrating Twenty Years of the Tim Winton Award for Young Writers (2013). The latter features the winning story from each year of the award from 1993 to 2012. In 2022, there were over 1300 entries.

In 2023, Craig Silvey became patron of the award, which was renamed the Craig Silvey Award for Young Writers. However, it was announced in January 2026 that Silvey would have no further association with the awards, after Silvey had been charged with possessing and distributing child exploitation material.

== Personal life ==
Winton met his wife Denise when they were children at school. When he was 18 and recovering from a car accident, they reconnected as she was a student nurse. They married when Winton was 21 and she was 20, and had three children together. As his fame has grown, Winton has guarded his and his family's privacy and rarely speaks in public, except to promote a new book or to support an environmental issue.

Winton's younger brother, Andrew Winton, is a musician and a high school chaplain. His younger sister is Sharyn O'Neill, who in 2018 became the Public Sector Commissioner of Western Australia, after 12 years as director general of the WA Education Department.

Winton has lived in Italy, France, Ireland and Greece. As of 2016 he was living in Western Australia.

== Bibliography ==
=== Novels ===
- An Open Swimmer (1982)
- Shallows (1984)
- That Eye, the Sky (1986)
- In the Winter Dark (1988)
- Cloudstreet (1991)
- The Riders (1994)
- Blueback (1997)
- Dirt Music (2001)
- Breath (2008)
- Eyrie (2013)
- The Shepherd's Hut (2018)
- Juice (2024)

=== Short fiction ===
Collections

- Scission (1985)
- A Blow, A Kiss (1985)
- Minimum of Two (1987)
- The Collected Shorter Novels of Tim Winton (1995)
- The Turning (2004)

Stories

Title	Year	First published	Reprinted/collected	Notes
Abbreviation	2003		"Abbreviation"/"Ten viet tat", Truyen ngan Uc/Australian Short Stories, Rose Moxham (ed), Trinh Lu (translator), Hoi Nhaa Van, 2005	
Aquifer	2000	Winton, Tim (Summer 2000). "Aquifer". Granta. 70: 39–52.	The Beacon Best of 2001, Junot Diaz (ed), Beacon Press, 2001	
Big world	2004		Journeys: Modern Australian Short Stories, Barry Oakley (ed), Five Mile Press, 2007	
Cockleshell	2004		"Cockleshell", Harvard Review, No. 27, Christina Thompson (ed), 2004	
Small mercies	2006			Novella

=== Plays ===
- Rising Water (2011)
- Signs of Life (2012)
- Shrine (2013)

=== Children's and young adult fiction ===
- Jesse (1988)

The Lockie Leonard trilogy (1990–1997) for young adults, including:

  - Lockie Leonard, Human Torpedo (1990)
  - Lockie Leonard, Scumbuster (1993)
  - Lockie Leonard, Legend (1997)
- Blueback (1997)
- The Bugalugs Bum Thief (1991)
- The Deep (1998) – picture book illustrated by Karen Louise

=== Non-fiction ===
- Land's Edge (1993) – with Trish Ainslie and Roger Garwood
- Local Colour: Travels in the Other Australia (1994), republished in the U.S. as Australian Colors: Images of the Outback (1998) – photography and text by Bill Bachman, additional text by Tim Winton
- Down to Earth: Australian Landscapes (1999) – text by Tim Winton and photographs by Richard Woldendorp
- "How the Reef was Won", The Bulletin, vol. 121 no. 6384, 5 August 2003
- "Landing", A Place on Earth: An Anthology of Nature Writing from Australia and North America, Mark Tredinnick (ed), University of Nebraska Press and University of New South Wales Press, 2003
- Smalltown (2009) – text by Tim Winton and photographs by Martin Mischkulnig
- Island Home (2015)
- Tide-Lands – Idris Murphy (2015) text by Tim Winton and art by Idris Murphy
- The Boy Behind the Curtain (2016 memoir) – also available as 7-CD pack, read by Winton, pub. ABC/Bolinda

== Adaptations ==
=== Stage and radio ===
- That Eye the Sky adapted by Justin Monjo and Richard Roxburgh – stage New Theatre, Newtown, 2017
- Cloudstreet adapted by Paige Gibbs – ABC Radio
- Cloudstreet adapted by Nick Enright and Justin Monjo; first performed by Black Swan Theatre Company; toured internationally with Belvoir Street Theatre
- Lockie Leonard, Human Torpedo adapted by Paige Gibbs. First performed by the Perth Theatre Company
- Lockie Leonard, Scumbuster adapted by Garry Fry. First performed by Theatre South, Wollongong 1998
- Bugalugs Bum Thief adapted by Spare Parts Puppet Theatre
- Bugalugs Bum Thief adapted by Monkey Baa Theatre Company – live theatre
- The Deep adapted by Spare Parts Puppet Theatre, 2001
- Blueback adapted by Peta Murray for Terrapin Puppet Theatre and Spare Parts Puppet Theatre
- The Turning adapted by Bill McCluskey performed by the Perth Theatre Company for the 2008 Perth International Writers' Festival (PIAF)
- An opera adaptation of The Riders by Victorian Opera at the Malthouse Theatre, 2014
- An opera adaptation of Cloudstreet, State Opera of South Australia. Her Majesty's Theatre, Adelaide, premiered 12 and 13 May 2016.
- Stage adaptation of The Shepherd's Hut, adapted by Tim McGarry, performed by Black Swan Theatre Company, directed by Matt Edgerton, May 2026

=== Screen ===
- A film based on That Eye the Sky, directed by John Ruane, was released in 1994
- In the Winter Dark, a film adaptation of the novel of the same name, was directed by James Bogle and released in 1998.
- Two television series based on the Lockie Leonard books. The first series screened in 2007, the second in 2010.
- A short film based on the short story "The Water Was Dark and It Went Forever Down", directed by Miranda Edmonds, was released in 2009. It screened at many film festivals, including the Rhode Island International Film Festival, CinefestOZ, Canada International Annual Film Festival in 2009, where it won third prize; Flickerfest 2010; and St Kilda Short Film Festival 2010; and was a finalist in the ATOM Awards (Best Short Film) in 2010.
- The TV miniseries Cloudstreet was aired in 2011. The screenplay was co-written by Winton and Ellen Fontana, with Matthew Saville directing.
- The Turning, an anthology drama film, was released in September 2013.
- A film adaptation of the short story "Secrets", titled The Well (Manto acuífero was directed by Australian director Michael Rowe, made in Mexico, and released in 2013.
- Breath, a film adaptation of the novel of the same name, was released in September 2017.
- Dirt Music, a film adaptation of the novel of the same name, directed by Gregor Jordan, was released in October 2020.
- Blueback, a film adaptation of the novel of the same name directed by Robert Connolly, was released on 1 January 2023.
- A film titled The Riders, based on the novel, was announced in 2018. As of July 2026 it is in production by U.S. studio A24, directed by Edward Berger and with Brad Pitt in the lead role as Fred Scully. Ridley Scott is producing the film, and the cast includes Julianne Nicholson and young actor Coco Greenstone.
- It was announced in July 2026 that Juice would be adapted into a feature film by British production company Working Title Films. Abi Morgan has been engaged as screenwriter, and Joe Wright as director.

== Literary awards and nominations ==
- Four time Miles Franklin Award winner, 1984, 1992, 2002, 2009
- Two time Booker Prize nominee 1995, 2002

=== Full list of awards and nominations ===
An Open Swimmer

- 1981 Australian Vogel National Literary Award

Shallows

- 1984 Miles Franklin Award,
- 1985 Joint Winner Western Australian Premier's Book Award – Fiction

Scission and Other Stories

- 1985 Western Australian Council Literary Award
- 1985 Joint Winner Western Australian Premier's Book Award – Fiction

Minimum of Two and Other Stories

- 1988 Winner Western Australian Premier's Book Award – Fiction

Jesse (picture book)

- 1990 Winner Western Australian Premier's Book Award: Children's Book

Cloudstreet

- 1991 NBC Banjo Award for Fiction
- 1991 Western Australian Premier's Book Award Fiction
- 1992 Deo Gloria Award
- 1992 Miles Franklin Award

Related to Cloudstreet

- 1999 AWGIE Award (for playwrights Nick Enright & Justin Monjo)
- 2002 Helpmann Award (Best Direction of a Play: Neil Armfield)
- 2002 Helpmann Award (Best Play)

Lockie Leonard, Human Torpedo

- 1991 Joint winner Western Australian Premier's Book Award: Children's Book
- 1993 American Library Association Best Book for Young Adults Award
- 1996 Winner YABBA Awards: Fiction for Older Readers

Lockie Leonard, Scumbuster

- 1993 Wilderness Society Environment Award

The Bugalugs Bum Thief

- 1994 Winner CROW Award (Children Reading Outstanding Writers): Focus list (Years 3–5)
- 1998 Winner YABBA Awards: Fiction for Younger Readers

The Riders

- 1995 Shortlisted Booker Prize
- 1995 Commonwealth Writers' Prize (South East Asia and South Pacific Region, Best Book)

Blueback

- 1998 Bolinda Audio Book Awards
- 1998 Wilderness Society Environment Award
- 1999 WAYRBA Hoffman Award for Young Readers

Lockie Leonard, Legend

- 1998 Family Award for Children's Literature,

Dirt Music

- 2001 Good Reading Award, 2001
- 2001 Western Australian Premier's Book Award Premier's Prize – Book of Year
- 2001 Western Australian Premier's Book Award Premier's Prize – Fiction
- 2002 Australian Booksellers Association Book of the Year Award
- 2002 Shortlisted Man Booker Prize
- 2002 Shortlisted Kiriyama Pacific Rim Book Prize, Fiction
- 2002 Miles Franklin Award
- 2002 New South Wales Premier's Literary Award, Christina Stead Prize for Fiction

The Turning

- 2004 Colin Roderick Award, 2004 – joint winner
- 2005 commended Commonwealth Writers Prize, South East Asia and South Pacific Region, Best Book
- 2005 shortlisted Frank O'Connor International Short Story Award
- 2005 New South Wales Premier's Literary Awards, Christina Stead Prize for Fiction
- 2005 Queensland Premier's Literary Awards, Best Fiction Book

Breath

- 2008 The Age Book of the Year, Fiction
- 2008 Indie Book Awards – Fiction
- 2009 Shortlisted Commonwealth Writers' Prize, South East Asia and the South Pacific Region
- 2009 Miles Franklin Award
- 2009 Shortlisted New South Wales Premier's Literary Awards, Christina Stead Prize

Eyrie

- 2014 shortlisted Australian Book Industry Awards (ABIA) – Australian Literary Fiction Book of the Year
- 2014 shortlisted Indie Book Awards – Fiction
- 2014 shortlisted Miles Franklin Award
- 2014 shortlisted Queensland Literary Awards – Fiction Book Award
- 2014 shortlisted Victorian Premier's Literary Awards – Fiction
- 2014 shortlisted Voss Literary Prize
- 2014 winner Western Australian Premier's Book Awards – People's Choice Award
- 2014 shortlisted Western Australian Premier's Book Awards – Fiction

Island Home: A Landscape Memoir

- 2015 highly commended The Fellowship of Australian Writers Victoria Inc. National Literary Awards – FAW Excellence in Non-fiction Award
- 2015 shortlisted Colin Roderick Award
- 2016 shortlisted New South Wales Premier's Literary Awards —Douglas Stewart Prize for Non-Fiction
- 2016 winner Australian Book Industry Awards (ABIA) – Australian General Non-Fiction Book of the Year
- 2016 shortlisted Prime Minister's Literary Awards – Non-Fiction
- 2016 shortlisted Queensland Literary Awards – Non-Fiction Book Award

The Boy Behind the Curtain

- 2017 longlisted Indie Book Awards – Nonfiction

The Shepherd's Hut

- 2019 shortlisted New South Wales Premier's Literary Awards, Christina Stead Prize for Fiction
- 2019 winner Voss Literary Prize

Juice

- 2025 shortlisted Prime Minister's Literary Award for Fiction
