= Bohemian style =

Non-conformist, ungrounded lifestyle

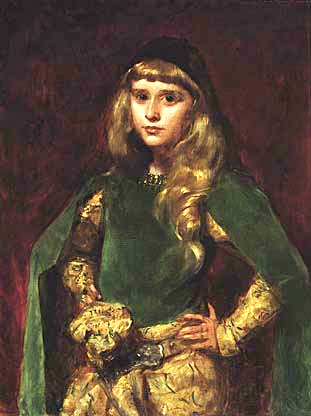
Young Bohémienne: Natalie Clifford Barney (1875–1972) at the age of 10 (painting by Carolus-Duran)

The Bohemian style, often termed "Boho chic", is a fashion and lifestyle choice characterized by its unconventional and free-spirited essence. While its precise origins are debated, Bohemian style is believed to have been influenced by the nomadic lifestyle of the Romani people during the late 19th century to the early 20th century. The term "Bohemian" derives from the French Bohémien, associated with the Roma community due to a historical misconception that they originated from Bohemia, a region in the Czech Republic.

Contemporary Bohemian fashion includes flowing fabrics, vibrant colors, and natural, woven materials instead of knits. This style draws inspiration from the counterculture movements of the 1960s and 1970s, reminiscent of the attire worn by attendees of the inaugural Woodstock music festival.

The Bohemian style has achieved global popularity, appealing to people seeking an individualistic approach to fashion and lifestyle. It encourages a sense of freedom and self-expression and attracts those who prefer to live unconventionally, sometimes in a nomadic manner, and who may reside in colonies or communes.

== Early 19th century and the role of women ==
The Bohemian subculture has been closely affiliated with predominantly male artists and intellectuals. The female counterparts have been closely connected with the Grisettes, young women who combined part-time prostitution with various other occupations. In the first quarter of the 19th century, the term "grisette" also referred to independent young women. They often worked as seamstresses or milliner's assistants and frequented Bohemian artistic and cultural venues in Paris. Many grisettes worked as artist models, often providing sexual favors to the artists in addition to posing for them. During the time of King Louis-Philippe, they came to dominate the Bohemian modeling scene.

Due to the role and influence they had on 19th century French art, the grisette became a frequent character in French fiction. However, the grisettes have been mentioned as early as in 1730 by Jonathan Swift. The term "grisette" in poetry signified qualities of both flirtatiousness and intellectual aspiration. George du Maurier based large parts of Trilby on his experiences as a student in Parisian Bohemia during the 1850s. Poe's 1842 story was based on the unsolved murder of Mary Cecilia Rogers near New York City, subtitled "A Sequel to 'The Murders in the Rue Morgue'". It was the first fictional detective story to attempt to provide a real solution to a real crime. The most enduring grisette is Mimi in Henri Murger's novel (and subsequent play) Scènes de la vie de Bohème, the source for Puccini's famous opera La bohème.

=== Pre-Raphaelites ===
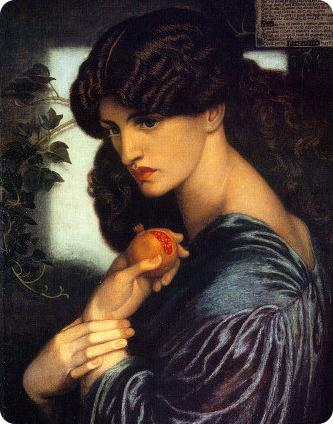
Jane Morris painted by Dante Gabriel Rossetti as Proserpine (1874)

In 1848 William Makepeace Thackeray used the word Bohemianism in his novel Vanity Fair. In 1862, the Westminster Review described a Bohemian as "simply an artist or littérateur who, consciously or unconsciously, secedes from conventionality in life and in art". During the 1860s the term was associated in particular with the Pre-Raphaelite movement, the group of artists and aesthetes of which Dante Gabriel Rossetti was the most prominent:

As the 1860s progressed, Rossetti would become the grand prince of Bohemianism as his deviations from normal standards became more audacious. He then became this epitome of the unconventional, his egocentric demands necessarily required his close friends to remodel their own lives around him. His Bohemianism was like a web in which others became trapped – none more so than William and Jane Morris.

=== Jane Morris, Edward Burne-Jones, and Pre-Raphaelite traits ===
Jane Morris, who was to become Rossetti's muse, epitomized, probably more than any of the women associated with the pre-Raphaelites, an unrestricted, flowing style of dress that, while unconventional at the time, would be highly influential at certain periods during the 20th century. She and others, including the much less outlandish Georgiana Burne-Jones (wife of Edward Burne-Jones, one of the later pre-Raphaelites), eschewed the corsets and crinolines of the mid-to-late Victorian era, a feature that impressed the American writer Henry James when he wrote to his sister in 1869 of the bohemian atmosphere of the Morrises' house in the Bloomsbury district of London and, in particular, the "dark silent medieval" presence of its chatelaine:

It's hard to say whether she's a grand synthesis of all the pre-Raphaelite pictures ever made … whether she's an original or a copy. In either case, she's a wonder. Imagine a tall, lean woman in a long dress of some dead purple stuff, guiltless of hoops (or of anything else I should say) with a mass of crisp black hair heaped into great wavy projections on each of her temples … a long neck, without any collar, and in lieu thereof some dozen strings of outlandish beads.

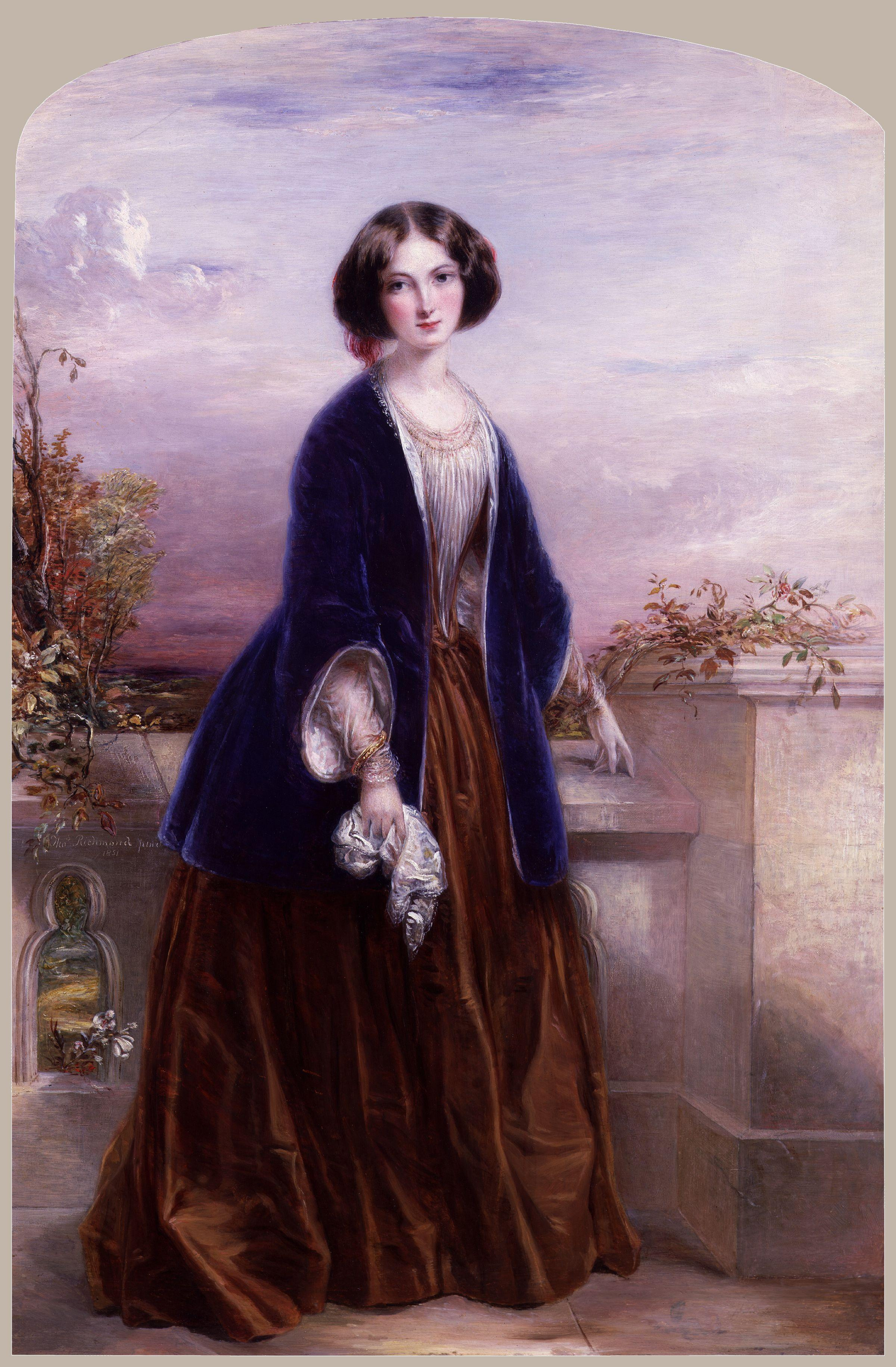
Effie Gray by Thomas Richmond

In his play Pygmalion (1912) Bernard Shaw unmistakably based the part of Mrs. Higgins on the then elderly Jane Morris. He described Mrs. Higgins' drawing room, he referred to a portrait of her "when she defied the fashion of her youth in one of the beautiful Rossettian costumes which, when caricatured by people who did not understand, led to the absurdities of popular estheticism [sic] in the eighteen-seventies".

A biographer of Edward Burne-Jones, writing a century after Shaw (Fiona MacCarthy, 2011), has noted that, in 1964, when the influential Biba store was opened in London by Barbara Hulanicki, the "long drooping structureless clothes", though sexier than the dresses portrayed in such Burne-Jones paintings as The Golden Stairs or The Sirens, nevertheless resembled them. The interior of Biba has been described by the biographer of British 20th century designer Laura Ashley as having an atmosphere that "reeked of sex … [It] was designed to look like a bordello with its scarlet, black and gold plush fitments, but, interestingly, it implied an old-fashioned, Edwardian style of forbidden sex with feathered boas, potted palms, bentwood coat racks and dark lighting" MacCarthy observed also that "the androgynous appearance of Burne-Jones's male figures reflected the sexually ambivalent feeling" of the late 1960s.

=== Early flower power: Effie Millais ===
Effie Gray, whose marriage to John Ruskin was annulled in 1854 before her marrying the pre-Raphaelite painter John Millais, is known to have used flowers as an adornment and probably also as an assertive "statement". While in Scotland with Ruskin (still her husband) and Millais, she gathered foxgloves to place in her hair. She wore them at breakfast, despite being asked by her husband not to do so, a gesture of defiance, at a time of growing crisis in their relationship, that came to the critical notice of Florence Nightingale (who tended to regard others of her sex with "scarcely concealed scorn" and was generally unsympathetic towards "women's rights"). A few weeks earlier, on Midsummer Day, Effie (possibly inspired by Shakespeare's A Midsummer Night's Dream) was said by her hostess, Pauline Trevelyan, to have "looked lovely" with stephanotis in her hair at an evening party in Northumberland, while, the previous year, a male friend had brought a vase of flowers for her hair from Venice. Ruskin's father was evidently shocked to learn that, when Effie herself was in Venice, she had removed her bonnet in public, ostensibly because of the heat.

In 1853 Millais painted Effie with Foxgloves in Her Hair which depicts her wearing the flowers while doing needlework. Other paintings of the mid-to-late 19th century, such as Frederick Sandys' Love's Shadow (1867) of a girl with a rose in her hair, sucking a sprig of blossom, which was described in 1970 as "a first rate PR job for the Flower People", and Burne-Jones' The Heart of the Rose (1889), have been cited as foreshadowing the "flower power" of the mid-to-late 1960s.

== Early 20th century and inter-war years ==
=== Rational dress and the women's movement ===
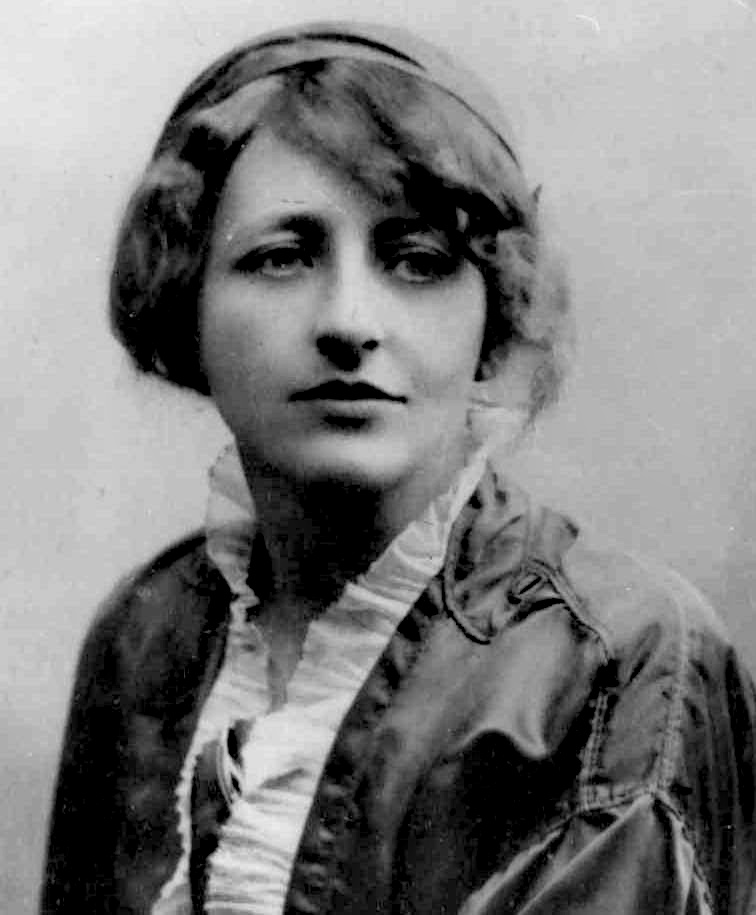
Franziska Countess zu Reventlow, undated photo, the "Bohemian Countess" of Schwabing

By the turn of the 20th century, an increasing number of professional women, notably in the United States, were attempting to live outside the traditional parameters of society. Between 1870 and 1910, the marriage rate among educated women in the United States fell to 60% (30% lower than the national average). By 1893, in the state of Massachusetts alone, some 300,000 women were earning their own living in nearly 300 occupations. The invention of the typewriter in 1867 was a particular spur. For example, by the turn of the 20th century, 80% of stenographers were women.

By this time, such movements as the Rational Dress Society (1881), with which the Morrises and Georgiana Burne-Jones were involved, were beginning to exercise some influence on women's dress, although the pre-Raphaelite look was still considered "advanced" in the late years of the 19th century. Queen Victoria's precocious daughter Princess Louise, an accomplished painter and artist who mixed in bohemian circles, was sympathetic to rational dress and to the developing women's movement generally (although her rumoured pregnancy at the age of 18 was said to have been disguised by tight corsetry).

However, it was not really until the First World War that "many working women" embarked on a revolution in a fashion that greatly reduced the weight and restrictions imposed on them by their clothing". Some women working in factories wore trousers. The brassiere (invented in 1889 by the feminist Herminie Cadolle and patented in America by Mary Phelps Jacob in 1914) began gradually to supersede the corset. In shipyards "trouser suits" (the term, "pantsuit" was adopted in America in the 1920s) were virtually essential to enable women to shin up and down ladders. Music hall artists also helped to push the boundaries of fashion; these included Vesta Tilley, whose daring adoption on the stage of a well-tailored male dress not only had an influence on men's attire but also foreshadowed to extent styles adopted by some women in the inter-war period. It was widely understood that Tilley sought additional authenticity by wearing male underclothing, although off stage, she was much more conventional in both her dress and general outlook.

By the early 1920s, what had been a wartime expedient, the need to economise on material, had become a statement of freedom by young women. This was manifested by shorter hemlines (just above the knee by 1925–1926) and boyish hairstyles, accompanied by what Robert Graves and Alan Hodge described as "the new fantastic development of Jazz music". At the Antwerp Olympic Games in 1920, the French tennis player Suzanne Lenglen attracted attention with a knee-length skirt that revealed her suspender belt whenever she leaped to smash a ball. From then on, sportswear for women, as with day-to-day clothes, became more free, although, after the Second World War, when the American player Gussie Moran appeared at the Wimbledon Championships of 1949 in a short skirt that revealed lace-trimmed panties, the All England Lawn Tennis and Croquet Club accused her of bringing "vulgarity and sin into tennis" and shunned the outfit's designer Teddy Tinling for many years.

==== The impact of lingerie in the 1920s and 30s ====
The Penguin Social History of Britain noted that "by the 1920s newspapers were filled with advertisements for 'lingerie' and 'undies' which would have been classed as indecent a generation earlier". Thus, in Ben Travers' comic novel Rookery Nook (1923), a young woman evicted from home in her nightwear and requiring day clothes remarked, "Combies. That's all right. But in the summer you know, we don't", while in Agatha Christie's thriller, The Seven Dials Mystery (1929), the aristocratic heroine, Lady "Bundle" Brent, wore only "a negligible trifle" under her dress; like much real life "it girls" of her class, she had been freed from the "genteel expectations" of earlier generations.

In Hollywood the actress Carole Lombard, who, in the 1930s, combined feistiness with sexual allure, never wore a brassière and "avoided panties". However, she famously declared that though "I live by a man's code designed to fit a man's world, at the same time I never forget that a woman's first job is to choose the right shade of lipstick" Coincidentally, sales of men's undershirts fell dramatically in the United States when Lombard's future husband, Clark Gable, was revealed not to be wearing one in a famous motel bedroom scene with Claudette Colbert in the film It Happened One Night (1934). According to Gable, "the idea was looking half-naked and scaring the brat into her own bed on the other side of the blanket [hanging from a clothesline to separate twin beds]". However, he "gave the impression that going without was a vital sign of a man's virility"

More generally, the adoption by the American movie industry of the Hays Production Code in the early 1930s had a significant effect on how moral, and especially sexual, issues were depicted on film. This included a more conservative approach to matters of dress. Whereas the sort of scanty lingerie on show in some earlier productions (for example, Joan Blondell and Barbara Stanwyck in Night Nurse, 1931) had tended to reflect trends that, in the 1920s, defied convention and were regarded by many young women as liberating, by the early years of the Depression such displays came to be regarded quite widely as undesirable. Developments in the late 1960s and 1970s, when the strictures of the code were abandoned, followed a similar pattern, although, by then, it was often women themselves who were in the vanguard of resistance to sexualized imagery.

Looking back at this period, Graves and Hodge noted the protracted course that "daring female fashions had always taken from brothel to stage, then on to Bohemia, to Society, to Society's maids, to the mill-girl and lastly to the suburban woman".

=== The "Dorelia" look ===
Among female Bohemians in the early 20th century, the "gypsy look" was a recurring theme, popularized by, among others, Dorothy "Dorelia" McNeill (1881–1969), muse, lover, and second wife of the painter Augustus John (1878–1961), whose full skirts and bright colors gave rise to the so-called "Dorelia look". Katherine Everett, née Olive, a former student of the Slade School of Art in London, has described McNeil's "tight fitting, hand-sewn, canary colored bodice above a dark gathered flowing skirt, and her hair very black and gleaming, emphasizing the long silver earrings which were her only adornment".

Everett recalled also the Johns' woods "with wild cherry trees in blossom, and a model with flying red hair, clad in white, being chased in and out of the trees by nude children". With similar lack of inhibition, as early as 1907 the American heiress Natalie Barney (1875–1972) was leading like-minded women in sapphic dances in her Parisian garden, photographs of which look little different from scenes at Woodstock in 1969 and other "pop" festivals of the late 1960s and early 1970s.

=== Bobbed hair and cross-gender styles ===
By contrast, short bobbed hair was often a Bohemian trait, having originated in Paris c.1909 and been adopted by students at the Slade several years before American film actresses such as Colleen Moore and Louise Brooks ("the girl in the black helmet") became associated with it in the mid-1920s. This style was plainly discernible on a woodblock self-portrait of 1916 by Dora Carrington, who had entered the Slade in 1910, and, indeed, the journalist and historian Sir Max Hastings has referred to "poling punts occupied by reclining girls with bobbed hair" as an enduring, if misleading, the popular image of the "idyll before the storm" of the First World War.

In F. Scott Fitzgerald's short story, Bernice Bobs Her Hair (1920), a young woman who wishes to become a 'society vamp' regards the adoption of a bob as a necessary prelude, while Louise Brooks' sexually charged performance as Lulu in G. W. Pabst's film, Pandora's Box (1929), left an enduring image of the style, which has been replicated on screen over the years, most vividly by Cyd Charisse in Singin' in the Rain (1952), Isabelle de Funès as Valentina in Baba Yaga (1973) and Melanie Griffith in Something Wild (1986).

Bobbed hair was associated also with many popular singers and actresses in the 1960s and has frequently been evoked by writers and directors, as well as fashion designers, seeking to recapture the hedonistic or free spirit of the 1920s. For example, Kerry Greenwood's Cocaine Blues (1989) and succeeding novels about Phryne Fisher, a glamorous, but unconventional aristocratic investigator in late twenties Melbourne, Australia, conveyed an image – "five feet two [157.5 centimeters] with eyes of green and black hair cut into a cap" – that was later cultivated stylishly on television by Essie Davis in ABC's Miss Fisher's Murder Mysteries (2012).

Around 1926 an even shorter style, known as the 'Eton crop', became popular: on her arrival in Tilling (Rye) in E. F. Benson's comic novel Mapp and Lucia (1931), Lucia described "Quaint" Irene as "a girl with no hat and an Eton crop. She was dressed in a fisherman's jersey and knickerbockers". For many years trite assumptions were often made about the sexuality of women with cropped hairstyles; a historian of the 1980s wrote of the Greenham Common "peace camp" in England that it "brought public awareness to feminist separation and even to lesbianism, hitherto seen in the mass media – when acknowledged at all – either in terms of Eton-cropped androgyny or of pornographic fantasy". Even so, others have drawn a stark contrast between the bohemian demeanor of the Greenham women and the "bold make-up and power-dressing" that tended to define women's fashion more generally in the 1980s (the so-called 'designer decade').

One social historian has observed that "the innocuous woolen jersey, now known [in Britain] as the jumper or the pullover, was the first item of clothing to become interchangeable between men and women and, as such, was seen as a dangerous symptom of gender confusion". Trousers for women, sometimes worn mannishly as an expression of sexuality (as by Marlene Dietrich as a cabaret singer in the 1930 film, Morocco, in which she dressed in a white tie suit and kissed a girl in the audience) also became popular in the 1920s and 1930s, as did aspects of what many years later would sometimes be referred to as "shabby chic". Winston Churchill's niece Clarissa was among those who wore a tailored suit in the late 1930s.

== Post-Liberation Paris ==
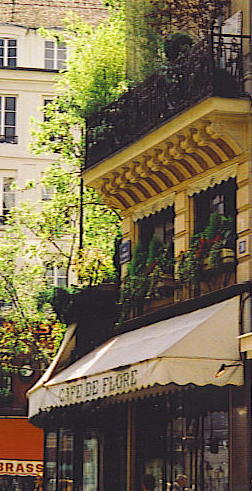
Café de Flore, Saint-Germain-des-Près, Paris: the haunt of post-war bohemians

=== The 'New Look' ===
After the Second World War Christian Dior's 'New Look', launched in Paris in 1947, though drawing on styles that had begun to emerge in 1938–1939, set the pattern for women's fashion generally until the 1960s. Harking back in some ways to the Belle Epoque of the late 19th and early 20th centuries – and thus not a 'new' look as such – it was criticized by some as excessively feminine and, with its accompanying corsets and rustle of frilled petticoats, as setting back the "work of emancipation won through participation in two world wars". It also, for a while, bucked the trend towards boyish fashion that, after the First World War, tended to follow major conflicts.

=== Rive Gauche ===
American influences had been discouraged during the Nazi occupation of France, but strengthened among intellectual café society in the mid-to-late 1940s, notably in the development of bebop and other types of jazz. In 1947, Samedi-Soir lifted the lid on what it called the "troglodytes of Saint-Germain", namely bohemians of the Parisian Left Bank (Rive Gauche) district of Saint-Germain-des-Prés, who appeared to cluster around existentialist philosopher Jean-Paul Sartre. These included Roger Vadim (who married and launched the career of actress Brigitte Bardot in the 1950s), novelist Boris Vian (since described as "the epitome of Left Bank Bohemia, standing at the center of its postwar rehabilitation") and singer Juliette Gréco.

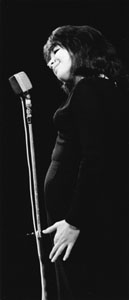
Juliette Gréco in 1963

==== Juliette Gréco ====
At the liberation of Paris in 1944, the American journalist Ernie Pyle observed that the women were all "brightly dressed in white or red blouses and colorful peasant skirts, with flowers in their hair and big flashy earrings." while Lady Diana Cooper, whose husband, Duff Cooper, became British Ambassador to Paris that year, wrote that, during the occupation, Parisienne women had worn "grotesquely large hats hung with flowers and fruits and feathers and ribbons" as well as high carved wooden shoes. However, in contrast to such striking bohemian adornments and subsequently the "New Look" (which itself scandalised some Parisennes), the clothes of the post-war bohemians were predominantly black: when Gréco first performed outside Saint-Germain she affronted some of her audience by wearing "black trousers, her bare feet slipped into golden sandals". In old age she claimed that this style of dress arose from poverty:

When I was a teenager in Paris, I only had one dress and one pair of shoes, so the boys in the house started dressing me in their old black coats and trousers. A fashion was shaped out of misery. When people copied me, I found it a little ridiculous, but I didn't mind. It made me smile.

Performing in London over fifty years later, Gréco was described as "still oozing bohemian style".

=== Saint-Germain in retrospect ===
Capturing the spirit of the time, David Profumo has written of how his mother, the actress Valerie Hobson, was entranced by Roger Vadim's flatmate, the director Marc Allégret, while she was filming Blanche Fury in 1947:

Allégret's apparently bohemian lifestyle appealed sharply to her romantic side and she revelled in the Left Bank milieu to which he introduced her during script discussions in Paris. There were meals with André Gide, Jean Cocteau and the long-legged Zizi Jeanmaire. For an attractive British woman who felt deprived of attention ... this was an ideal situation for some sort of reawakening.

The previous year a perfume created for Hobson had been marketed as "Great Expectations" to coincide with her role as Estella Havisham in David Lean's film of that name, based on Charles Dickens' 1861 novel. In England, this attracted the custom of University of Oxford undergraduate Margaret Roberts, later British Prime Minister Margaret Thatcher, who, a little daringly for the time, also shopped for "push-up" pink brassieres. In 1953, when Hobson starred in the musical The King and I in London, it was apparent that she had retained a Parisienne mix of chic and Bohemianism. A Daily Mirror journalist described her "pale, ladylike looks, her well-bred clothes ... she likes embroidery and painting", while a young Etonian who visited her dressing room recalled that "it had been freshly painted pink and white for her, and was like entering a risqué French apartment". Ten years later, when Hobson's husband, the politician John Profumo, was involved in a sex scandal that threatened to destabilize the British government, Prime Minister Harold Macmillan wrote that "his [Profumo's] wife is very nice and sensible. Of course, these people live in a raffish, theatrical, bohemian society where no one really knows anyone, and everyone is "darling"".

Post-war Paris was recalled fondly in 2007 when France introduced a ban on smoking in public places. The aroma of Gauloises and Gitanes was, for many years, thought to be an inseparable feature of Parisian café society, but the owner of Les Deux Magots, once frequented by Sartre, Simone de Beauvoir, Albert Camus and other writers, observed that "things have changed. The writers of today are not so addicted to cigarettes". A British journalist who interviewed Juliette Gréco in 2010 described Les Deux Magots and the Café de Flore as "now overpriced tourist hotspots" and noted that "chain stores and expensive restaurants have replaced the bookshops, cafés and revolutionary ideas of Jean-Paul Sartre and Simone de Beauvoir's Rive Gauche". As measures of changing attitudes to cuisine and fashion, by the early 21st century 80% of French croissants were being made in food plants, while, by 2014, only one factory continued to manufacture the traditional male beret associated with printers, artists, political activists and, during the inter-war years, the tennis player Jean Borotra.

=== New influences in 1960s ===
The bohemian traits of post-war Paris spread to other urban parts of the French-speaking world, notably to Algiers, where an underground culture of "jazz clubs, girls and drugs" grew up – in the words of punk rock producer Marc Zermati, who was in the city at the height of the Algerian war in the late 1950s, "all very French". However, that war marked a turning point which, in the view of some, was so traumatic that "ordinary French people" looked instead to America as "a new model for pleasure and happiness". This, in turn, led to the ye-ye music of the early to mid 1960s (named after the British band, the Beatles' use of "yeah, yeah" in some their early songs) and the rise of such singers as Johnny Hallyday and Françoise Hardy.

The French also adopted a number of British singers (Petula Clark, Gillian Hills, Jane Birkin) who performed successfully in French, Birkin forming a long-term relationship with singer-songwriter Serge Gainsbourg, who was a seminal figure in French popular music in the 1960s and 1970s. In 1968 major industrial and student unrest in Paris and other parts of France came close to ousting the government of President Charles de Gaulle, who, after leading the Free French during the Second World War, had returned to power at the time of the Algerian emergency. The events of 1968 represented a further significant landmark in post-war France, although their longer term impact was probably more on cultural, social and academic life than on the political system, which, through the constitution of the Fifth Republic (1958), has remained broadly intact. Indeed, one paradox of 1968 was that the first student demonstrations broke out at Nanterre, whose catchment area included the affluent and "chic" 16th and 17th arrondissements of Paris. Its students were more modish and "trendy" than those of the Sorbonne in the city's Latin Quarter, being described at the time in terms that typify more generally the styles and attitudes of young people in the late 1960s:

It is the girls that give the show away – culottes, glossy leather, mini-skirts, boots – driving up in Mini-Coopers ... Rebellious sentiment is more obvious among the boys: long hair, square spectacles, Che Guevara [Cuban revolutionary, died 1967] beards. The picture in Nanterre in May was lots and lots of painted dollies cohabiting with unkempt revolutionaries.

== America: the Beat Generation and flower power ==
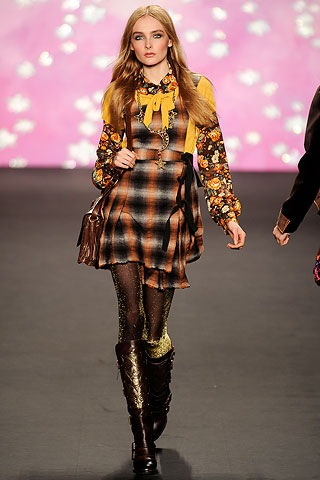
Snejana Onopka on the runway for Anna Sui in November 2011.

In the United States adherents of the "Beat" counter-culture (probably best defined by Jack Kerouac's novel, On the Road, set in the late 1940s, written in 1952 and published in 1957) were associated with black polo-neck (or turtle neck) sweaters, blue denim jeans and sandals. The influence of this movement could be seen in the persona and songs of Bob Dylan in the early- to mid-1960s, "road" films like Easy Rider (1969) and the punk-oriented "New Wave" of the mid-1970s, which, among other things, produced a boho style icon in Deborah Harry of the New York band Blondie. (However, as with some American musicians of the mid-1960s, such as Sonny and Cher, Blondie came to international prominence only after a tour of Britain in 1978.)

=== Greenwich Village and West Coast ===
New York's Greenwich Village, which, since the late 19th century, had attracted many women with feminist or "free love" ideals, was a particular magnet for Bohemians in the early 1960s. Bob Dylan's girl-friend Suze Rotolo, who appeared with him on the cover of his second album The Freewheelin' Bob Dylan (1963), recalled that the Village was "where people like me went – people who didn't belong where they came from ... where the writers I was reading and the artists I was looking at had lived or passed through". These "beatniks" (as they came to be known by the late 1950s) were, in many ways, the antecedents of the hippie movement that formed on the West Coast of the US in the mid-1960s and came to the fore as the first post-war baby-boomers reached the age of majority in the "Summer of Love" of 1967. The Monterey Pop Festival was a major landmark of that year, which was associated with "flowerpower", psychedelia, opposition to the Vietnam War and the inventive music and flowing, colorful fashions of, among others, Jimi Hendrix, the Mamas & the Papas, Jefferson Airplane and the British group, The Beatles, whose album, Sgt. Pepper's Lonely Hearts Club Band, is said to have caused the guru of psychedelia, Timothy Leary, to remark that "my work is finished".

=== Hippiedom and the Pre-Raphaelites ===
The documentary film, Festival (Murray Lerner, 1967), recorded how the "clean-cut college kids" who attended the Newport (Rhode Island) Folk Festival in 1963–1964 had, by 1965 (when Bob Dylan caused a sensation at that year's festival by playing an electric guitar), become "considerably scruffier": "the hippies were waiting to be born". Among other things, the wearing of male neckties, which, in the mid-1960s, had often drawn on 19th century paisley patterns, declined as muttonchop whiskers and teashades (sunglasses) came in: by the time of the Chicago 7 trial (late 1969), hair over the collars had become so commonplace that it was beginning to transcend Bohemian style, taking on mass popularity in the 1970s. The London art dealer Jeremy Maas reflected in the mid-1980s that:

there [was] no question that the Hippy [sic] movement and its repercussive influence in England owed much of its imagery, its manner, dress and personal appearance to the Pre-Raphaelite ideal ... It was observed by all of us who were involved with these exhibitions [of pre-Raphaelite paintings] that visitors included increasing numbers of the younger generation, who had begun to resemble the figures in the pictures they had come to see.

Jimmy Page of the British band Led Zeppelin, who collected Pre-Raphaelite paintings, observed of Edward Burne-Jones that "the romance of the Arthurian legends [captured in his paintings] and the bohemian life of the artists who were reworking these stories seemed very attuned to our time", while the author David Waller noted in 2011 that Burne-Jones' subjects "have much in common with the sixties rock chicks and their pop-star paladins".

== London in the 1950s ==
Although the annual Saturday Book recorded in 1956 a view that "London's now nothing but flash coffee bars, with teddies and little bits of girls in jeans", the "Edwardian" ("teddy boy") look of the times did not coincide with Bohemian tastes. For women, the legacy of the "New Look" was still apparent, although hemlines had generally risen as, as one journalist put it in 1963, "photographs of those first bold bearers of the New Look make them seem strangely lost and bewildered, as though they had mistaken their cue and come on stage fifty years late". The Bohemian foci during this period were the jazz clubs and espresso bars of Soho and Fitzrovia. Their habitués usually wore polo necks; in the words of one social historian, "thousands of pale, duffel-coat-clad students were hunched in coffee bars over their copies of Jean-Paul Sartre and Jack Kerouac". Various public houses and clubs also catered for Bohemian tastes, notably the Colony Room Club in Soho, opened in 1948 by Muriel Belcher, a lesbian from Birmingham. As with the literary phenomenon of the so-called "Angry Young Men" from 1956 onwards, the image was more a male, than a female, one. However, when the singer Alma Cogan wished to mark her success by buying mink coats for her mother and sister, the actress Sandra Caron, the latter asked for a duffel-coat instead because she wanted to be regarded as a serious actress and "a sort of a beatnik". In 1960 the future author Jacqueline Wilson, who, as a teenager, lived in Kingston-upon-Thames, Surrey, captured this look after spotting two acquaintances in a record shop "in turquoise duffle coats, extremely tight jeans and cha-cha shoes being cuddled by a group of horrible spotty teddy boys".

=== Continental influences ===
In Iris Murdoch's novel The Bell (1958), an art student named Dora Greenfield bought "big multi-colored skirts and jazz records and sandals". However, as Britain emerged from post-war austerity, some Bohemian women found influences from continental Europe, adopting, for example, the "gamine look", with its black jerseys and short, almost boyish hairstyles associated with film actresses Audrey Hepburn (Sabrina, 1954, and as a "Gréco beatnik" in Funny Face, 1957) and Jean Seberg (Bonjour Tristesse, 1958 and A bout de souffle, 1960), as well as the French novelist Françoise Sagan, who, as one critic put it, "was celebrated for the variety of her partners and for driving fast sports cars in bare feet as an example of the free life". In 1961 Fenella Fielding played "a mascara-clad Gréco-alike" in The Rebel with comedian Tony Hancock, while, more recently, Talulah Riley replicated the look for scenes in ITV's 2006 adaptation of Agatha Christie's The Moving Finger, set in 1951.

Others favored the lower-cut, tighter styles of continental stars such as Bardot or Gina Lollobrigida. Valerie Hobson was among those whose wardrobe drew on Italian couture; in addition to a large collection of stiletto heeled shoes, she possessed a skirt made from python skin. More generally, European tastes – including the Lambretta motor scooter and Italian and French cuisine, which the widely traveled cookery writer Elizabeth David, herself a bit of a Bohemian, did much to promote – not only began to pervade Bohemian circles, but offered a contrast, from 1955 onwards, with the brasher Americanism of rock 'n' roll, with its predominantly teenage associations.

== Hamburg and Beatlemania ==
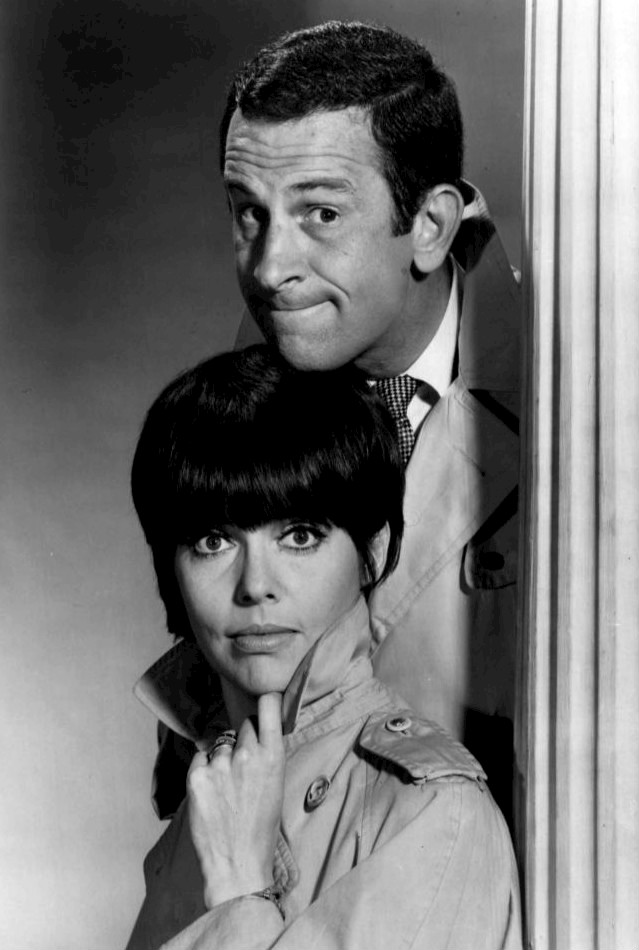
Bobbed hair revival: Barbara Feldon with Don Adams in Get Smart (1965)

In 1960, when the Beatles (then an obscure Liverpudlian combo with five members, as opposed to their eventual "fab" four) were working in Hamburg, West Germany, they were influenced by a Bohemian "art school" set known as Exis (for "existentialists"). The Exis were roughly equivalent to what in France became known as les beats and included photographer Astrid Kirchherr (for whom the "fifth Beatle" Stuart Sutcliffe left the group) and artist and musician Klaus Voormann (who designed the cover for the Beatles' album Revolver in 1966).

John Lennon's wife Cynthia recalled that Kirchherr was fascinated by the Beatles' "teddy-boy style", but that they, in turn, were "bowled over by her hip black clothes, her avant garde way of life, her photography and her sense of style". As a result the group acquired black leather jackets, as well as fringed hairstyles that were the prototype of the "mop-top" cuts associated with "Beatlemania" in 1963–1964. The latter coincided with the revival of the bobbed style for women, promoted in London by hairdresser Vidal Sassoon, initially for actress Nancy Kwan, and adopted by, among others, singers Cilla Black, Billie Davis and, in America, Bev Bivens of We Five and Tammi Terrell, fashion designers Mary Quant and Jean Muir, American actress Barbara Feldon in the TV series Get Smart, and, in the form of a longer bob, Cathy McGowan, who presented the influential British TV pop music show, Ready Steady Go! (1963–1966). However, when longer blonde hair (associated with, among many others, Julie Christie, Samantha Juste, Judy Geeson and fashion model Lorna McDonald, who, at the end of each edition of the BBC's Dee Time, jumped into Simon Dee's open E-type Jaguar) came to typify the "sixties" look, advertisers turned to the Bohemian world for inspiration: through its use of herbs, Sunsilk shampoo was said to have "stolen something from the gypsies".

== Swinging London ==
Beatlemania did not of itself create the apparent iconoclasm of the 1960s; however, as one writer put it, "just as Noël Coward and Cole Porter reflected the louche, carefree attitude of the [Nineteen] Twenties, so did the Beatles' music capture the rhythm of breaking free experienced by an entire generation of people growing up in the Sixties". By the middle of the decade, British pop music had stimulated the fashion boom of what Time called "swinging London". Associated initially with such "mod" designs as Quant's mini-skirt, this soon embraced a range of essentially Bohemian styles. These included the military and Victorian fashions popularized by stars who frequented boutiques such as Granny Takes a Trip, the "fusion of fashion, art and lifestyle" opened by Nigel Waymouth in the King's Road, Chelsea in January 1966, and, by 1967, the hippie look largely imported from America (although, as noted, London stores such as Biba had, for some time, displayed dresses that drew on Pre-Raphaelite imagery). The Rolling Stones' Keith Richards, whose early girlfriend, Linda Keith, had, in her late teens, been a bohemian force in West Hampstead, noted on the Stones' return from an American tour in 1967 how quickly hippiedom had transformed the London scene.

=== Victorian imagery ===
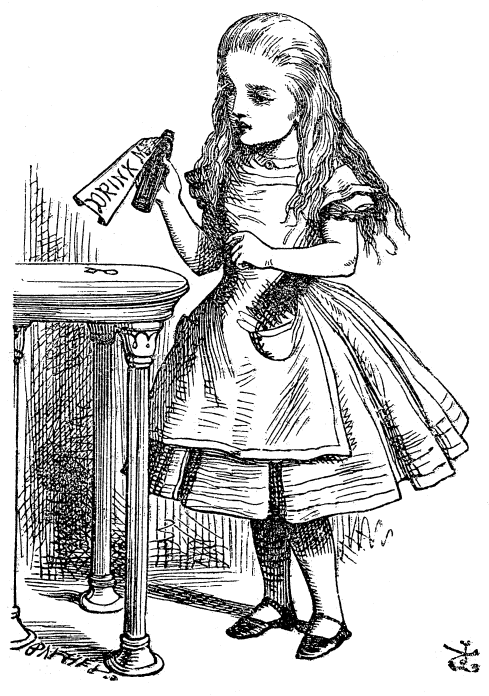
Lewis Carroll's Alice (John Tenniel)

This fusion of influences was discernible in two black-and-white productions for BBC television in 1966: the series Adam Adamant Lives!, starring Gerald Harper as an Edwardian adventurer who had been cryopreserved in time and Juliet Harmer as Georgina Jones, a stylish "mod" who befriended him, and Jonathan Miller's dreamy, rather Gothic production of Lewis Carroll's mid-Victorian children's fantasy Alice in Wonderland (1865). (Confirming the aspiration, Sydney Newman, the BBC's Head of Television Drama in the 1960s, reflected of Adam Adamant that "[they] could never quite get [the] Victorian mentality to contrast with the '60s".)

On the face of it, Carroll (a pseudonym for Charles Lutwidge Dodgson) had been a rather conventional and repressed Oxford University don, but he was a keen and artistic photographer in the early days of that medium (taking, among other things, rather bohemian looking pictures of Alice Liddell and other young girls) and he developed an empathy and friendship with several of the Pre-Raphaelites; the sculptor Thomas Woolner and possibly even Rossetti dissuaded him from illustrating Alice himself, a task that was undertaken instead by John Tenniel. The imagery of Alice, both textually and graphically, lent itself well to the psychedelia of the late 1960s. In America, this was apparent in, among other ways, the "Alice happening" in Central Park, New York (1968) when naked participants covered themselves in polka dots and the lyrics to Grace Slick's song "White Rabbit" (1966) – "One pill makes you larger/And one pill makes you small" – that she performed with both the Great Society and Jefferson Airplane, including with the latter at Woodstock in 1969.

== Late 1960s to 1990s: Women's liberation and "girl power" ==
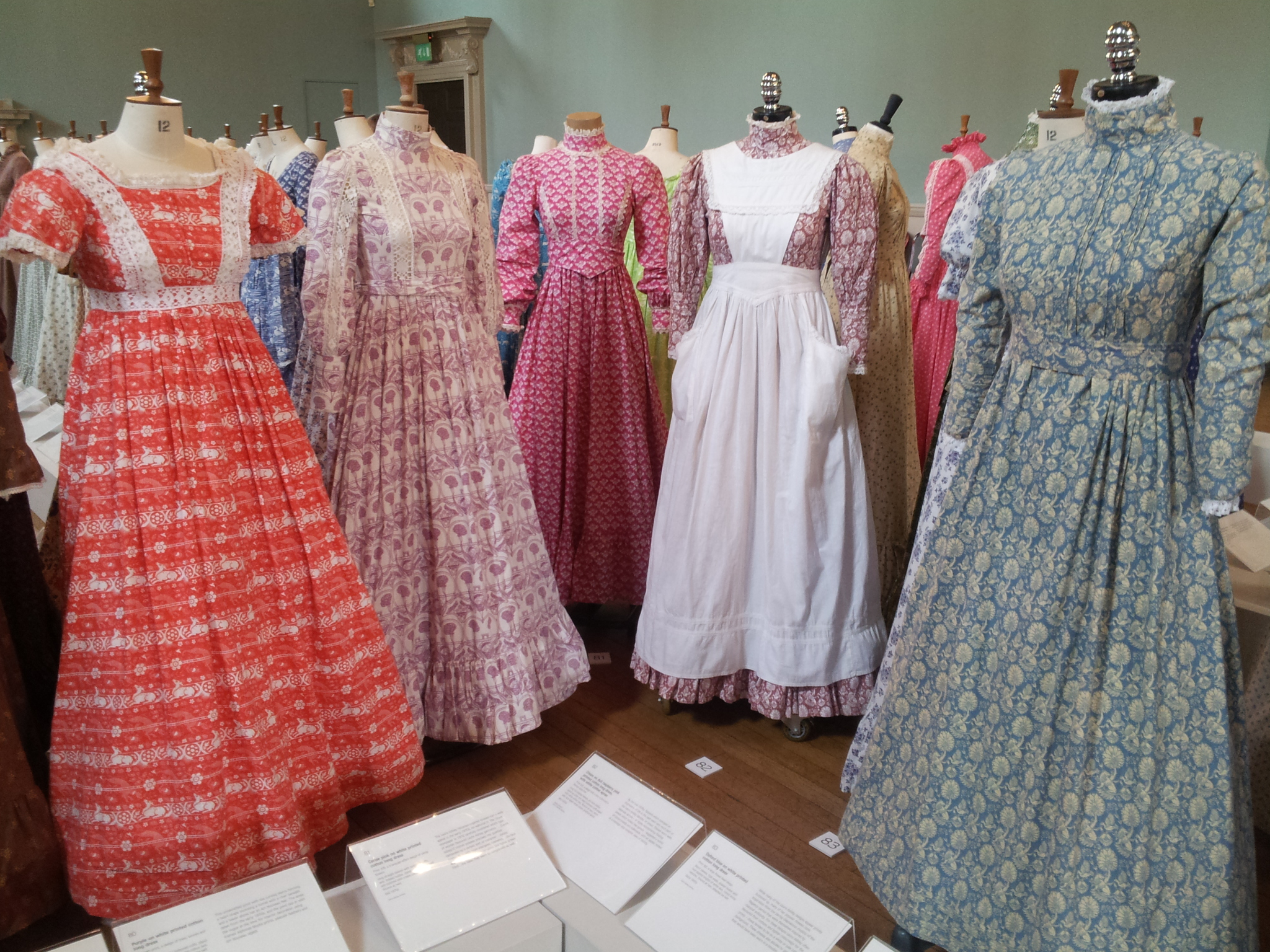
Mid 1970s dresses by Laura Ashley exhibited at the Fashion Museum, Bath, England in 2013

By the late 1960s shops such as Laura Ashley (whose first London outlet opened in 1968) were routinely promoting the "peasant look" and selling a range of "uniquely eccentric clothes ... The magic was being able to step into a 'Laura Ashley' dress and imagine you had found something out of a dressing-up box". At around the same time too, and into the 1970s, the brassière (or bra), which, as noted, had been seen as a liberating innovation in the early part of the century, came to be regarded by some women, such as the Australian academic Germaine Greer (The Female Eunuch, 1969), as an unduly restrictive symbol of traditional womanhood. However, the much-publicised incidence of "bra burning" in the 1970s tended to be overstated and came to be satirised: for example, in the 1973 film, Carry On Girls, and a poster by Young & Rubicam, one of a mildly subversive series for Smirnoff vodka: "I never thought of burning my bra until I discovered Smirnoff". It was also seen by many, including Greer herself, as a distraction from the cause of women's "liberation". A Vermont lawyer later observed wryly that "like every good feminist-in-training in the sixties, I burned my bra", but that "now it's the nineties ... I realize Playtex [underwear manufacturer] had supported me better than any man I know." Claire Perry, who became a Conservative Member of Parliament in 2010 and later a government minister, reflected that, as a "women's officer" at Oxford University in the early 1980s, she was "a bra-burning feminist with a hideous new-romantic haircut", but that her feminism had, in her view, matured.

=== "Girl power" ===
By the mid-1980s, the American singer Madonna had turned the bra into a positive, even provocative, fashion statement. Madonna's flamboyant and gritty style (notably seen to bohemian effect alongside Rosanna Arquette in the 1985 film, Desperately Seeking Susan) was, in turn, a precursor of so-called "girl power" that was associated in the 1990s with various prominent young women (such as singers Courtney Love, who played the 1999 Glastonbury Festival in a headline-grabbing pink bra, and the more commercially oriented Spice Girls) and offbeat or quirky American television series (Xena: Warrior Princess, Buffy the Vampire Slayer, Caroline in the City, Sex and the City, Penny in The Big Bang Theory).

In the early 21st century the MeToo Movement (especially in the years immediately before the COVID-19 pandemic struck in 2020) called in to question many previous attitudes about the depiction and treatment of women: for example, the extent to which young women had really felt liberated by social trends and fashions in the mid 20th century.

== Hippie/boho-chic since the 1960s ==
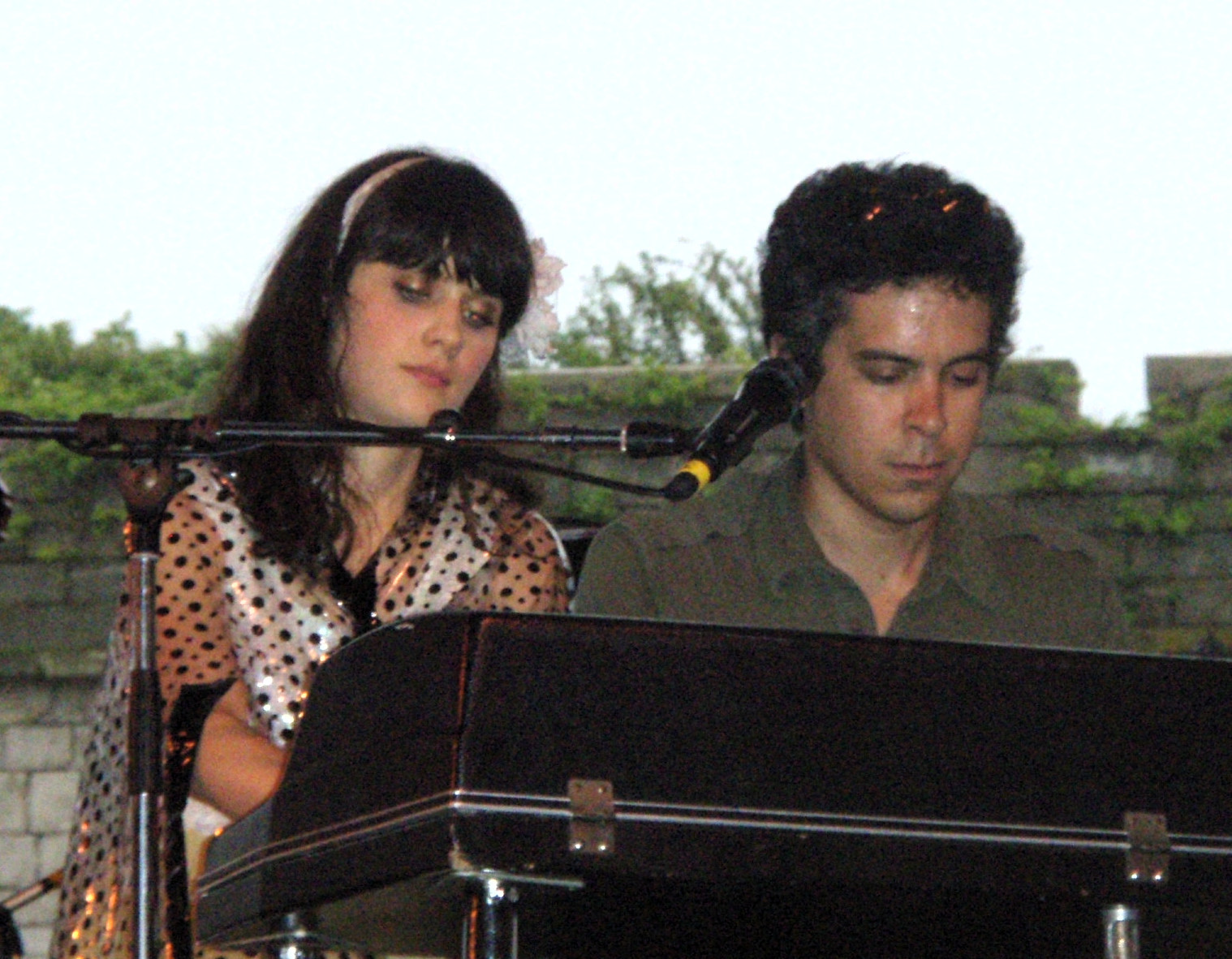
Zooey Deschanel (left) performing with M. Ward as She & Him, Newport Folk Festival, 2008

Journalist Bob Stanley remarked that "the late 1960s are never entirely out of fashion, they just need a fresh angle to make them de jour". Thus, the features of hippie fashion re-emerged at various stages during the ensuing half century.

In the mid-to-late 1980s, variants of the short and fundamentally un-Bohemian rah-rah skirt (which originated with cheerleaders) were combined with leather or denim to create a look with some Bohemian or even gothic features (for example, by the singing duo Strawberry Switchblade who took inspiration from 1970s punk fashion). In the 1990s the term, "hippie chic", was applied to Tom Ford's collections for the Italian house of Gucci. These drew on, among other influences, the style, popular in retrospect, of Talitha Getty (died 1971), actress wife of John Paul Getty and step-granddaughter of Dorelia McNeil, who was represented most famously in a photograph of her and her husband taken by Patrick Lichfield in Marrakesh, Morocco in 1969. Recalling the influx of hippies into Marrakesh in 1968, Richard Neville, then editor of Oz, wrote that "the dapper drifters in embroidered skirts and cowboy boots were so delighted by the bright satin '50s underwear favored by the matrons of Marrakesh that they wore them outside their denims à la Madonna [the singer] twenty-five years later".

In the early 21st century, "boho-chic" was associated initially with supermodel Kate Moss and then, as a highly popular style in 2004–2005, with actress Sienna Miller. In America, similar styles were sometimes referred to as "bobo-", "ashcan chic", or "luxe grunge", their leading proponents including actresses Mary-Kate Olsen and Zooey Deschanel. As if to illustrate the cyclical nature of fashion, by the end of the 2000s strong pre-Raphaelite traits were notable in, among others, singer Florence Welch, model Karen Elson and designer Anna Sui.

In Germany, terms like Bionade-Bourgeoisie, Bionade-Biedermeier or Biohème refer to former Bohemians that gained a sort of Cultural hegemony with their LOHA lifestyle; the phenomenon of such former (young) bohemians becoming established during the years is a typical aspect of gentrification processes. A bon mot of Michael Rutschky claimed that at the end of the 20th century, "not the Proletariat, but the Bohème became the ruling class". The group in question uses especially food as a means of distinction and separation. Among others, the lemonade trademark Bionade has been connected with the phenomenon.

== See also ==
- Bohemia in London
- Romani dress
