= Death at Victoria Dock =

1992 novel by Kerry Greenwood

- Author: Kerry Greenwood
- Language: English
- Genre: Detective fiction
- Published: 1992
- Publisher: McPhee Gribble
- Publication place: Australia
- ISBN: 0869142666
- Preceded by: Murder on the Ballarat Train
- Followed by: The Green Mill Murder

Death at Victoria Dock is a crime novel by Kerry Greenwood, first published in 1992 in Australia by McPhee Gribble. It is the fourth novel featuring Phryne Fisher.

== Plot introduction ==
The Honourable Phryne Fisher is on her way home, driving past Victoria Docks in Melbourne, late evening when a shot shatters her windshield. She stops, to find a man wearing an anarchist tattoo, lying on the road, bleeding. He dies before she can get medical help. Along with her companion and maid, Dorothy 'Dot' Williams, and her friends, Bert and Cec, she attempts to solve the mystery of who shot and killed this man. Along the way she meets and is attracted to an anarchist with a strange past, who goes by the name of Peter Smith. Phryne and her friends assist Inspector Jack Robinson of the Melbourne Police to solve the murder, encountering, in the process, a bank robbing and an abduction.

== Characters ==
=== Recurring characters ===
- The Honourable Miss Phryne Fisher: a wealthy private detective
- Dorothy 'Dot' Williams: Phryne's maidservant and social secretary
- Bert (Albert Johnson) and Cec (Cecil Yates): cab drivers in Melbourne who occasionally act as investigative assistants to Phryne
- Mr and Mrs. Butler: Phryne's butler and housekeeper, respectively
- Jane (née Graham) Fisher and Ruth (née Collins) Fisher: Phryne's Adopted Daughters
- Dr. Elizabeth Macmillan: An older woman with pepper and salt hair who is a doctor at the women's hospital and one of Phryne's best friends.
- Detective-Inspector Jack Robinson: Phryne's favourite police detective
- Constable Hugh Collins: Young Catholic Constable who has taken a shine to Dot.

=== Other characters ===
- Peter "Smith": Latvian revolutionary and now Phryne's Lover.
- Nina Gottstein: One of the Latvians, but she's in love with a hulking, but sweet Australian.
- Bill
- Karl
- Kasimov
- Mr. Waddington-Forsythe - An older man of about 60 with 14-year-old twins (son and daughter). His first wife died 7 years previous, and his new wife is only 25 and expecting.
- Alicia Waddington-Forsythe - A 14-year-old school acquaintance of Jane and Ruth's who is missing. Mr. Waddington-Forsythe hires Phryne to find her.
- Paul Waddington-Forsythe - Alicia's twin brother. He is arrogantly beautiful and far too attached to his young step-mother.
- Christine Waddington-Forsythe - 25-year-old secret keeping wife and step-mother who both Waddington-Forsythe men are devoted to, and who Alicia hates.
- Mother Superior - Anglican Nun who Alicia turns to for help

== Critical reception ==
Reviewing the book for the Historical Novel Society Patrika Salmon stated: "Phryne is the woman we'd all like to be: debonair, independent and brilliant, the Australian private investigator who never turns a hair...It’s a wonderful read, and a delightful glimpse of 1920s Melbourne. I’m glad the early books are being republished and look forward to adding them to my bookshelf."

== TV adaptation ==
The novel was adapted for the fourth episode of season one of Miss Fisher's Murder Mysteries, directed by Tony Tilse from a script by Kerry Greenwood and Shelley Birse.
