= Phryne Fisher =

Detective in novels by Kerry Greenwood

- Phryne Fisher mysteries character
- First appearance: Cocaine Blues
- Created by: Kerry Greenwood
- Portrayed by: Essie Davis

In-universe information
- Gender: Female
- Title: The Honourable
- Family: Henry George Fisher, Baron Richmond (father) - In TV series only Annabelle Fisher (half-sister, deceased) - In TV Series only Jane Fisher (sister, deceased) - In TV series only Eliza Fisher (sister) - In books only
- Children: Jane Fisher (daughter, adopted); Ruth Fisher (daughter, adopted) -
- Relatives: Prudence Stanley - Television Only (aunt); Peregrine Fisher (niece) - Television only
- Religion: Church of England
- Nationality: Australian

The Honourable Phryne Fisher (/ˈfraɪni/ FRY-nee), often called "Miss Fisher", is the main character in Australian author Kerry Greenwood's series of Phryne Fisher detective novels. The character later appeared in a television series called Miss Fisher's Murder Mysteries, and the film Miss Fisher and the Crypt of Tears. Phryne is a wealthy aristocrat and private detective who lives in St Kilda, Melbourne. The first 15 novels are set in the year 1928. With the assistance of her companion Dot, and Bert and Cec (who are wharfies, taxi drivers and "red raggers" [Australian slang of that period meaning communists]), she solves all manner of crimes.

As a crime fiction character, she has been called a "quintessentially Australian" construction. Phryne is no ordinary aristocrat, as she can fly a plane, drives her own car (a Hispano-Suiza) and sometimes wears trousers. While displaying bohemian panache, she manages also to maintain style and class. Phryne was accidentally named after Phryne, a famous Greek courtesan who lived in the 4th century BC. At her christening, her father forgot the classical name Psyche that her parents had intended for her.

== Biography ==
=== Early life ===
Phryne is described in the first of Kerry Greenwood's books, Cocaine Blues, as being named after the courtesan Phryne, after her father forgot her chosen name of Psyche at the christening. Phryne was not always rich, having been born into a poor family in Collingwood, Melbourne. Her childhood was one of poverty and she occasionally had to scavenge for food in the pig-bins in Victoria Market. She often ate rabbit and cabbage because there was no other food available. In Cocaine Blues, she tells her maidservant and secretary Dot that during her youth, she "starved like Billy-o" and that her sister died of diphtheria and starvation.

In the First World War, the other male heirs to a British peerage were killed, and Phryne's father inherited the title. Though in the book Blood and Circuses, her father is erroneously described as an earl, the rest of the series books (such as The Castlemaine Murders) and the TV series correctly describe her father as a Baron, consistent with her title throughout both. As his daughter, she was granted the style of "The Honourable Phryne Fisher" (which is the title for a daughter to a Baron or Viscount while as a daughter to an Earl she would instead be "Lady Phryne") and an enormous fortune. She has an aunt, Mrs. Prudence Stanley. Although she is described as having sisters and a brother, it is not clear how many sisters she has, but her younger sister died of diphtheria.

After completing school, Phryne ran away to France where she joined a French women's ambulance unit during the Great War, receiving a reward for bravery and a French war pension. She then worked as an artist's model in Montparnasse after the war. Following her time in France, Phryne travelled widely and has disclosed that she has, amongst other places, visited Florence and spent a night in a Turkish prison (for unknown reasons).

=== Move to Australia and career as a detective ===
Phryne Fisher's career as a detective is described in Cocaine Blues as having had its origins in an incident that took place at her family's estate in England. At an evening ball, a diamond necklace belonging to one of the guests disappeared, and Phryne was able, through observing the guests and the room, to quickly identify the person responsible for the theft as Bobby, a young cricket-playing aristocrat.

Impressed by her skills, another guest at the party, a retired Colonel Harper and his wife, Mrs. Harper, engaged Phryne to travel to Australia, her country of birth, and find out if his daughter, Lydia Andrews, was being treated well by her husband, John Andrews. This set in motion the events described in the first of Kerry Greenwood's books on Phryne Fisher, Cocaine Blues. Phryne's motivation to take up private detection as a career is rooted, at least initially, in boredom with the activities of high society in England. Although she did previously engage in charitable works, Phryne noted that "the company of the Charitable Ladies was not good for her temper."

In Flying Too High, Phryne Fisher decides to settle down in Melbourne, buying a house at 221B, The Esplanade, and moving in there with Dot Williams, her maid. She also engages Mr. and Mrs. Butler to act as her butler and housekeeper, respectively. Phryne confesses to her friend Bunji Ross that she bought the house because it was numbered 221 and that she added 'B' in an obvious reference to the home of Sherlock Holmes at 221B Baker Street.

Through the course of the books, Phryne collects a personal maid, Dot; two adoptive daughters, Ruth and Jane (whom she rescued from slavery); a cat, Ember; a dog, Molly; and two loyal servants, the Butlers. She also has relationships with a string of lovers, most notably Lin Chung, a wealthy Chinese man (whom she rescues in the city one evening). Lin is the only lover with whom she maintains a relationship for more than a few books and even goes so far as to make a deal with his autocratic and overbearing grandmother that after he is married, she (Phryne) be allowed to continue a relationship with him.

== Character and appearance ==
=== Appearance ===
Phryne is described in Cocaine Blues as having a 'short black cap of hair' which is very straight, and cut to leave the nape of her neck and most of her forehead uncovered. She has grey-green eyes. In Flying Too High, she is described by an acquaintance as being 'small, thin, with black hair cut in what I am told is a bob, disconcerting grey-green eyes and porcelain skin. Looks like a Dutch doll." – a description that Phryne herself agrees with.

=== Character and skills ===
Phryne can shoot and often carries, and uses, a lady's handgun in her purse. She is frequently described as being possessed of great courage and fearlessness, and personally admits to having very few actual fears (one of them being head-lice, which she abhors). She rarely cries, noting in Cocaine Blues that the last time she had done so was over a book of poetry by Wilfred Owen, after being sickened by the deaths in World War I.

Phryne being an experienced pilot, in Flying Too High, she performed a number stunts in a Gipsy Moth plane. She has also flown Dr. Elizabeth Macmillan, her friend and a surgeon, through unavoidable conditions to provide medical assistance to those who needed it. Phryne is also skilled as a driver, and drives a red Hispano-Suiza.

She is fond of dancing and has learned to dance the tango from 'the most expensive gigolo on the Rue de Chat-qui-Peche' in Paris. She speaks French fluently, with a Parisian accent and peppered with 'indelicate apache idioms'.

Phryne is described as being fond of the luxuries her position and wealth afford her, while always being conscious of her impoverished origins. She tells the Princess de Grasse in Cocaine Blues that "there is nothing like being really poor to make you relish being really wealthy." She often carries cash on her person, reasoning that she is unused enough to wealth to want the security of having readily available funds. She is generous with her money, and tips well.

Phryne is frequently described as dressing in high fashion and her clothes are often described in great and elaborate detail. She occasionally dresses in trousers and men's shirts. Phryne also enjoys good food. She is 'devoted' to lobster mayonnaise with cucumbers, in particular. Despite her numerous relationships and conduct that some parts of society might find shocking, Phryne describes herself as being immune to blackmail, showing no alarm, for instance, when Bobby Matthews, a thief she had once caught, threatens to tell all of Melbourne that she had once visited an expensive gigolo in Paris.

=== Relationships ===
Although Phryne has had several relationships with men, she is described as being disinclined to settle down and marry. She is described in her books as using a diaphragm sold by Dr. Marie Stopes to avoid unwanted pregnancies. She is described as being heterosexual, and often politely rebuffs advances from women who are attracted to her.

In Cocaine Blues, for instance, she is the subject of the attentions of both Sasha De Lisse and his twin sister Ellie, but tells Sasha that she would prefer him over her, in general. She also declines an unstated offer from a woman attending to her at the Turkish Baths in Melbourne, (Note: Although there had been three Victorian Turkish baths on Lonsdale Street and Russell Street in the 19th-century, only Fullalove's survived till the mid-1920s. But the baths visited by Phryne were actually steamy Russian-style baths rather than the hot dry-air Victorian type.) and notes that she had visited several bars frequented by lesbian and bisexual women in the company of her friend and gigolo, Georges Santin, in Paris. Phryne notes that she "had little leaning towards homosexuality but she had liked the lesbian bars. They were free of the domination of men, creating their own society."

=== Family ===
Phryne's relationship with her family can occasionally be strained. In Cocaine Blues, after a theft of jewelry belonging to a guest at a dinner party hosted by the Fishers, Phryne's father and mother engage in a vocal altercation, a situation that Phryne describes as 'normal'. On her arrival in Melbourne, she is initially embarrassed to discover that her father had left a number of unpaid debts of honour there, including one to the local MP, Mr. Sanderson.

Phryne once describes herself as having 'not the faintest spurt of maternity' and demonstrates a disinclination towards young children.

== Main and recurring characters ==
=== Dorothy 'Dot' Williams ===
Dorothy Williams, known as 'Dot' is Phryne's confidential companion and social secretary. Phryne meets Dot soon after her arrival in Melbourne, while taking a walk through the city. Dot, possessed of a knife, had been trying to find and kill her former employer's son, who had repeatedly harassed and molested her and had her fired when she resisted his advances. Phryne convinces Dot to hand over the knife and gives her food to eat, and then secures Dot's revenge by using the knife to surreptitiously cut through her persecutor's braces (suspenders), thus disrobing and publicly embarrassing him. Phryne then offers Dot a job as her personal companion and secretary, which Dot accepts. Dot is described as being a very devout Catholic and is very neat with a particular talent for delicate mending and sewing work. She is close to her family and her mother, in particular, whom she visits frequently.

=== Bert (Albert Johnson) and Cec (Cecil Yates) ===
Cecil Yates, known as 'Cec', and Albert Johnson, known as 'Bert', together run and operate a taxi cab in Melbourne, Australia. Phryne Fisher first meets them when her ship docks at Melbourne, and they transport her luggage as well as Dr. Elizabeth Macmillan's to their respective hotels. Cec is described as being tall and blonde-haired, with brown eyes and a taciturn, quiet manner. Bert, on the other hand, is short, darker and older than Cec, as well as more voluble. Cec and Bert are both described as 'red-raggers' i.e. Communists. Cec, in particular, is a gifted navigator with a keen memory for the streets of Melbourne, and is also described as having a soft spot for any animal or person in trouble. Cec and Bert eventually join Phryne as investigative assistants. Phryne Fisher pays them enough money to enable them to buy a new taxi to replace their old one.

=== Jane (née Graham) and Ruth (née Collins) Fisher ===
Phryne's adopted daughters, Jane, age 13, and Ruth, no older than 15, possibly 14.

=== Hugh Collins ===
One of Jack's police constables and Dot's beau.

=== Mr Tobias Butler and Mrs Aurelia Butler ===
Phryne's butler and cook. Mr and Mrs. Butler initially planned to retire after working for a long period of time, but were persuaded out of retirement by Phryne Fisher's generous offer of employment as well as her request that they maintain the confidentiality of her work as a private detective. In Flying Too High, they are known by the names 'Ted' and 'Else'

=== Dr. Elizabeth Macmillan ===
Dr. Elizabeth Macmillan is a Scottish surgeon who works at the Queen Victoria hospital for women in Melbourne, Australia. She is a friend of Phryne's. Dr. Macmillan and Phryne reunited during Phryne's voyage by ship from England to Australia in Cocaine Blues. Dr. Macmillan is described as being of around forty-five years of age, with a broad, strong physique, rough and calloused hands, and a weatherbeaten complexion. Her black hair, now turning white, is cut into a 'short Eton crop' and she tends to dress in men's clothes for convenience. Phryne and Dr. Macmillan first meet when there is a 'flu epidemic at a remote island, and Phryne steps in to fly Dr. Macmillan in on a plane despite dangerous weather conditions. She then assists Dr. Macmillan in attending to the unwell residents of the island, including slaughtering a Highland cow to make them broth.

=== Jillian Henderson ===
Jillian Henderson is a lawyer and a friend of Phryne Fisher's. She frequently represents clients referred to her by Phryne, and has inherited her practice from her father, who was partner in a firm called Henderson, Jones, and Mayhew.

=== Detective Inspector John 'Jack' Robinson ===
Phryne Fisher first meets Detective Inspector Jack Robinson while investigating a cocaine ring in Cocaine Blues, and becomes friends with him thereafter. He respects her skills and intelligence, and the two frequently collaborate on criminal investigations. He is described in Murder on the Ballarat Train as being a "private man with a doting family, who grew grevilleas and rare native orchids in his yard."

=== Police Constable Jones ===
Woman Police Constable Jones works for Detective Inspector Jack Robinson and is one of the few women in the police force. She frequently acts as a bait and decoy in investigations and has won a medal for Gallantry for baiting and capturing a suspect in a string of rapes.

== Secondary characters ==
- Lin Chung – Phryne's lover
- Li Pen – A Shaolin monk and Lin's bodyguard
- Eliza Fisher – Phryne's sister
- Lady Alice – Eliza Fisher's lover
- Tinker – Teenaged boy who Phryne uses as an associate

== Books ==
1. Cocaine Blues (1989) aka Death by Misadventure (US) aka Miss Phryne Fisher Investigates (UK)
2. Flying Too High (1990)
3. Murder on the Ballarat Train (1991)
4. Death at Victoria Dock (1992)
5. The Green Mill Murder (1993)
6. Blood and Circuses (1994)
7. Ruddy Gore (1995)
8. Urn Burial (1996)
9. Raisins and Almonds (1997)
10. Death Before Wicket (1999)
11. Away with the Fairies (2001)
12. Murder in Montparnasse (2002)
13. The Castlemaine Murders (2003)
14. Queen of the Flowers (2004)
15. Death by Water (2005)
16. Murder in the Dark (2006)
17. Murder on a Midsummer Night (2008)
18. Dead Man's Chest (2010)
19. Unnatural Habits (2012)
20. Murder and Mendelssohn (2013)
21. Death in Daylesford (2020)
22. Murder in Williamstown (2022)
23. Murder in the Cathedral (November 2025)
- The Phryne Fisher Mysteries: Cocaine Blues / Flying Too High (Omnibus edition) (2004)
- A Question of Death (short story collection) (2008)
- Introducing the Honourable Phryne Fisher: books 1–3 (Omnibus edition)(2010)
- The Lady with the Gun Asks the Questions (short story collection) (2021)

== In other media ==
=== Television ===
Miss Fisher's Murder Mysteries is a television costume drama series based on the novels, starring Essie Davis in the title role. The Australian Broadcasting Corporation and Every Cloud Productions produced the series of thirteen one-hour episodes, the first series of which premiered on ABC1 on 24 February 2012.

A second series of 13 episodes followed in 2013, telecast from 6 September to 22 December.

A third series of 8 episodes has been released in 2015. The first episode aired on 8 May, and the season wrapped up with Episode 8 on 26 June.

A spin-off series called Ms Fisher's Modern Murder Mysteries featuring a niece named Peregrine that was set during the early 1960s period, had two seasons across 2019–2021.

The original series awards included.:

- Australian Film Institute Award Nomination for Best Television Drama Series (2016)
- Australian Film Institute Award Nomination for Best Costume Design in Television (2016)
- Australian Film Institute Award Winner for Best Costume Design in Television (2014)
- Australian Film Institute Award Nomination for Best Lead Actress in a Television Drama (Essie Davis, 2013)
- Logie Awards, Gold Logie Award Nomination (Essie Davis, 2016)
- Logie Awards, Silver Logie Award Nomination for Best Actress (Essie Davis, 2016)
- Logie Awards, Silver Logie Award Nomination for Most Outstanding Actress (Essie Davis, 2016)
- Logie Awards, Silver Logie Award Nomination for Most Popular Actress (Ashleigh Cummings, 2013)
- Sichuan Television Festival, Gold Panda Award Nomination for Best Writing for a Television Series (2013)

=== Videogame ===
In 2015, Every Cloud Productions announced that they had partnered with Melbourne studio Tin Man Games to create a Miss Fisher’s Murder Mysteries game for mobile devices. Miss Fisher and the Deathly Maze, a detective game in the visual novel style, was released in two parts for iOS and Android devices in 2017. Both parts were released together for Windows and Mac computers via Steam in 2018. The game received positive reviews, and won an Australian Game Developer Award (AGDA) in 2017.

=== Feature film ===
A stand-alone action-adventure feature film, Miss Fisher and the Crypt of Tears picked up the story from the end of the third series. It began production in October 2018. The film was budgeted at $8 million, and was directed by Tony Tilse. It premiered in January 2020.

Since 2016, there had been speculation on the possibility that the television series would be made into a feature film. In May 2016, Essie Davis acknowledged interest in playing Miss Fisher in a film. "[We’re] just working out the ideas of how to make it bigger and better and more fabulous than the TV show," she said. Later that year, it was revealed that plans were afoot to produce a trilogy of Phryne Fisher films.

In April 2017, a photo was published on the official Miss Fisher Murder Mysteries Instagram account showing Essie Davis and Nathan Page holding advance copies of a film script titled Miss Fisher and the Crypt of Tears. On 14 September 2017, a crowdfunding campaign was launched on Kickstarter in support of the film. On 15 December 2017, an additional ongoing crowdfunding campaign was begun through IndieGoGo in order to allow fans to continue supporting the effort. The original campaign reached its goal of $250,000 in less than 48 hours.

== Bibliography ==
- Greenwood, Kerry (1989). Cocaine Blues. Australia: McPhee Gribble. ISBN 978-0869141724.
- Greenwood, Kerry (1991). Murder on the Ballarat Train. Australia: McPhee Gribble. ISBN 978-0869142455.
- Greenwood, Kerry (1992). Death at Victoria Dock. Australia: McPhee Gribble. ISBN 978-0869142660.
