= Flying Too High =

1990 novel by Kerry Greenwood

- Author: Kerry Greenwood
- Language: English
- Series: Phryne Fisher
- Publisher: Penguin Books
- Publication date: 1990
- Publication place: Australia
- Media type: Print
- Pages: 173 pp.
- ISBN: 0869142151
- Preceded by: Cocaine Blues
- Followed by: Murder on the Ballarat Train

Flying Too High is a crime novel by Australian author Kerry Greenwood, and was published in 1990 by Penguin Books. It is the second novel by Kerry Greenwood that features the fictional detective Miss Phryne Fisher.

== Introduction ==
Flying Too High, set in Melbourne, Australia in the 1920s, features fictional detective Phryne Fisher as she attempts to resolve a homicide case as well as solve the kidnapping of a small child. She is engaged by a woman who fears that her hot-tempered son, an aviation instructor, will kill his own father over a business dispute. Phryne first disarms the son by demonstrating her excellent flying skills and then advises him to calmly resolve the dispute with his father. Despite this warning, the father is murdered soon after, and Phryne, along with her friends, Cec and Bert, her maid Dot and fellow pilot Bunji Ross, attempt to help Melbourne's Detective Inspector Jack Robinson solve the crime. In addition, Phryne looks into a case of kidnapping concerning the child of a flying instructor, all while moving into her new house at 221B, The Esplanade, in Melbourne. This book also introduces two recurring characters in the Miss Fisher books by Kerry Greenwood; Mr and Mrs. Butler, who act as Phryne Fisher's butler and housekeeper respectively.

== Plot summary ==
Having established herself as a private detective in Melbourne and solved a number of cases after the events in Cocaine Blues, Phryne Fisher is engaged by Mrs. William McNaughton to investigate a family dispute. Mrs. McNaughton expresses concerns that her hot-tempered son, Bill, might attempt to kill her husband William McNaughton following an altercation with them about business. Bill McNaughton runs a moderately unsuccessful flying school, in which his father is a principal investor and chairman of the board, and a vociferous opponent of Bill's plans to raise additional funds to fly over the North Pole. Phryne visits Bill McNaughton's flying school and dispels his initial doubts about her flying abilities by flying a series of tricky manoeuvres in his Gipsy Moth plane, culminating in a walk over the upper wings of the plane while Bill holds the plane steady in the air. Having impressed Bill, Phryne advises him to resolve matters with his father peacefully and avoid disturbing his mother, who is alarmed by their loud fighting.

Soon after, Mr. William McNaughton is found murdered on his tennis court, and Mrs. McNaughton arrives at Phryne's house asking for her help in investigating the murder. While she is unconscious, Phryne looks through her belongings and finds letters suggesting that Mrs. McNaughton may have been engaging in an affair. Amelia McNaughton, her daughter, comes to retrieve her, and reveals to Phryne that she is engaged in a romance with an Italian sculptor, Paolo Rugazzi, and that her father, the deceased William McNaughton, was abusive and violent and had assaulted Amelia as well as her mother on several occasions. Phryne purchases some of Amelia's sketches, commissions a painting from her, and locates Mr. William McNaughton's will, which allows an inheritance to his wife and daughter on the condition that they do not marry. Amelia also tells her that she intends to marry her lover Paolo Rugazzi despite being aware of his infidelities as she loves him regardless. Along with Detective-Inspector Benton, Phryne visits the scene of crime where she learns that Mr. McNaughton was killed by a heavy blow to the head on his tennis court, and that a rock was identified as the murder weapon, and also that there may have been two witnesses who might be able to testify that Bill McNaughton was elsewhere while his father was being murdered. Phryne also discovers that Amelia frequently hosts local children to play on their property, a practice that her father abhors.

Phryne engages her friend and lawyer, Jillian Henderson, to represent Bill McNaughton. She visits Paolo Rugazzi's studio, where he mistakes her for one of his models. Phryne poses in the nude for Paolo, allowing him to complete a difficult and beautiful sculpture, and culminating in their going to bed together. She then discloses to Rugazzi who she is, and confirms that she is looking after Amelia. Rugazzi explains to Phryne that while other women, including Phryne, are attractive, Amelia is his muse and will be for life, and describes his intentions to marry her. Phryne also confirms that Rugazzi is independently wealthy. Meanwhile, Jillian Henderson manages to secure bail for Bill Henderson and Phryne agrees to help Bill McNaughton prove his innocence provided he treats his sister Amelia and her fiance Paolo Rugazzi, as well as their mother, with respect and kindness. Phryne involves her friends and sometime investigative assistants, Burt and Cec, to track down the two witnesses.

Acting on Phryne's instructions, Burt and Cec find the two witnesses, as well as the correct murder weapons. Phryne solves a small side-question of a kidnapping and then diverts herself by successfully seducing Dr. Fielding, a local doctor who had attended to Mrs. McNaughton. Phryne convinces Amelia McNaughton to have a small party and invite the local children that she occasionally her family, Paolo Rugazzi, Detective-Inspector Benton, Bert and Cec. There, she demonstrates that Mr. McNaughton's death was caused by an accident that resulted from a game played by the local children. The children had been attempting to build a pyramid in imitation of the recently discovered pyramids of Luxor, and had attached a large stone to a rope hanging from a tree. Mr McNaughton, enraged by their presence on his property, went to rebuke them, resulting in their panicking and releasing the rope and stone, which swung and delivered a blow that killed him. The police were then lead off track because Amelia McNaughton, finding her father's body, assumed her brother had killed him and attempted to hide the evidence. The police agree to not lay charges against either the children or Amelia McNaughton, and Jillian Henderson ensures that neither Mrs. McNaughton nor Amelia are denied their inheritances.

A subplot concerns the abduction of Candida Alice Maldon, a six-year-old child and the daughter of Henry Maldon, a flying instructor. Candida slips out of her house without her parents' knowledge to buy sweets at a shop down the road, but is abducted on her way home by strangers in a black car. Her stepmother Molly Maldon finds the abandoned packet of sweets while hunting for Candida and manages to retrace her steps, confirming that Candida may have been kidnapped. Henry Maldon had previously been confirmed as the winner of the Irish Christmas Lottery. After receiving a ransom message from the kidnappers, Henry Maldon is persuaded by his friend and fellow flying instructor Jack Leonard to ask Phryne Fisher for help. Phryne promptly agrees to help. Phryne enlists the help of Detective Inspector Jack Robinson in tracing fingerprints on the ransom note and it is discovered that one of the sets of finger-prints belong to a man suspect of molesting children, Sidney Brayshaw. He also helps her trace the owners of the car used to kidnap Candida Maldon: a young couple, Mike and Ann. Ann's expensive habits had led them into debt and blackmail, leading Ann and a reluctant Mike to collaborate with Sid on the kidnapping. Along with the pilot Jack Leonard, Phryne launches a dangerous plot to retrieve Candida. A decoy package of newspapers disguised with some currency is used to bait the kidnappers, and Phryne straps herself to their car and leaves a trail of luminous paint behind. Bunji Ross and Henry Maldon use a light aircraft and a torchlight to trace Phryne's trail of luminous paint, bringing them to the kidnappers' den without attracting their attention. Phryne climbs off the back of the car and rescues Candida. She is aided by Mike, who was disgusted to discover Sid was a child-molester and that his wife's spending had led them into debt and blackmail, and changes his mind about the kidnapping. Phryne releases Mike and tricks Sid into keeping quiet about it.

== Characters ==
Recurring Characters

- The Honourable Miss Phryne Fisher: a wealthy private detective
- Dorothy 'Dot' Williams: Phryne's maidservant and social secretary
- Bert (Albert Johnson) and Cec (Cecil Yates): cab drivers in Melbourne who occasionally act as investigative assistants to Phryne
- Mr and Mrs. Butler: Phryne's newly engaged butler and housekeeper, respectively
- Jillian Henderson: a lawyer, and Phryne Fisher's friend
- Detective-Inspector 'Theory' Benton: a police officer investigating the murder of William McNaughton. He dislikes Phryne Fisher and resents her involvement in the investigation.
- Detective-Inspector Jack Robinson
- Woman Police Constable Jones

Other Characters

- Bill McNaughton, a flying instructor and the owner of a flying school
- Amelia McNaughton, Bill's sister and an artist
- Jack Leonard, a pilot and flying instructor
- Henry Maldon, a flying instructor at Bill McNaughton's flying school, and his wife Molly, as well as their daughter Candida Alice.
- 'Bunji' Ross: one of Phryne's schoolfriends, a former jockey and now a pilot.
- Dr. Fielding: a young local doctor, just beginning in his medical practice.
- Paolo Rugazzi: an Italian sculptor and Amelia McNaughton's lover
- Isola di Fraoli: a singer and one of Phryne's friends

== Notes ==
- Dedication: To David Lewis John Greagg / My own dear darling
- Epigraph: Flying too high with some girl in the sky / Is my idea of nothing to do / But I get a kick out of you / 'I Get a Kick Out of You', Cole Porter

== Publication history ==
After the novel's initial publication in 1990 by Penguin Books, Australia, it was reprinted as follows:

- Ballantine Books, USA, 1992
- Penguin Books, Australia, 1993
- Allen & Unwin, Australia, 2005
- Poisoned Pen Press, USA, 2006

The novel was also translated into German in 1999, and French and Russian in 2006.

== Adaptations ==
Cocaine Blues, as well as other novels featuring Phryne Fisher, were adapted into the Australian television series Miss Fisher's Murder Mysteries. However, Flying Too High did not form a part of these television adaptations.
