= Miss Fisher and the Crypt of Tears =

2020 film directed by Tony Tilse

- Theatrical poster
- Directed by: Tony Tilse
- Screenplay by: Deb Cox
- Based on: Miss Fisher's Murder Mysteries by Deb Cox & Fiona Eagger; Phryne Fisher novels by Kerry Greenwood
- Produced by: Deb Cox; Fiona Eagger
- Starring: Essie Davis; Nathan Page
- Cinematography: Roger Lanser
- Edited by: Stephen Evans
- Music by: Greg Walker
- Production company: Every Cloud Productions
- Release date: 27 February 2020
- Running time: 101 minutes

Miss Fisher and the Crypt of Tears is a 2020 Australian mystery adventure film directed by Tony Tilse and starring Essie Davis as Phryne Fisher. It is based on the Miss Fisher's Murder Mysteries television series and the series of Phryne Fisher novels written by Kerry Greenwood.

== Plot ==
Phryne Fisher helps to rescue a young Bedouin girl called Shirin from imprisonment in 1920s Jerusalem. While doing so she is suspected of having died. Shirin is reunited with her uncle Sheikh Kahlil Abbas and they travel to Lofthouse Manor in England where a memorial is being held for Miss Fisher by her friends Lord and Lady Lofthouse. DI Jack Robinson travels to England from Australia to attend the memorial and is just about to deliver her eulogy when Miss Fisher arrives in her biplane. They decided to have a surprise Welcome Back Party.

Shirin discusses with Miss Fisher about how she came to be in Jerusalem. As a child, a sandstorm had wiped out her village and she was the only survivor, having been rescued by a mysterious stranger. This stranger has now sent her a letter asking to meet at All Saints' Church at midnight. Miss Fisher notices that the letter had already been opened so volunteers to attend the meeting on Shirin's behalf as it could be dangerous. On her way to the meeting, she asks DI Robinson to accompany her to the meeting. At the church, she approaches a British man called Wilson. He is shot by an unknown assailant. Before dying, he gives Miss Fisher an emerald amulet which he asks her to give to Shirin. Miss Fisher and DI Robinson are arrested at the scene and the police reveal that Wilson was a felon who had deserted the British army with fellow soldier Captain Harry Templeton, who has already been executed for desertion.

Miss Fisher and DI Robinson visit antiquities expert Professor Linnaeus, who explains that the amulet is engraved with the inscription "Crypt of Tears". Linnaeus explains that legend says that during Alexander the Great's last campaign through Palestine, he suffered a horrible loss and was so bereaved that his very tears created a desert spring, really a tomb. It is also said that Alexander placed a curse on the tomb whereby anyone who disturbs it, and their loved ones, will be cursed. Linnaeus warns Phryne that the amulet is proof that the tomb has been disturbed, which has triggered the curse. While there, the unknown assailant attempts to steal the amulet from DI Robinson, who manages to fight them off. The following morning, Miss Fisher sneaks into the Sheikh's bedroom at Lofthouse Manor, where she discovers that the Sheikh had signed an agreement with Lord Lofthouse and businessman Vincent 'Monty' Montague involving the British Palestine Railways. However, after learning from Shirin that it was British soldiers who murdered their family, Kahlil angrily breaks off the contract and loudly denounces the British during a party at Lofthouse's manor. Later in the night, he is shot dead by the unknown assailant.

DI Robinson visits Captain Templeton's widow, who gives him an astrolabe which had been owned by her husband. He also learns that after Templeton's execution, and the supposed disturbance of the tomb, his at the time pregnant widow went into early labour, despite there being no complications before then. The baby didn't survive. Miss Fisher finds a large emerald in a pot in the Sheikh's room which is verified by Professor Linnaeus as being linked to the amulet. DI Robinson, Miss Fisher, Jonathon Lofthouse (the younger brother of Lord Lofthouse), and Shirin all travel to Negev and find a tomb in the desert using the astrolabe. There they find an ancient corpse preserved in honey. The body is that of Alexander's secret desert bride who died, leading to his grief. Another corpse is found near the coffin, which had been stabbed by a dagger carrying Jonathon's insignia. Jonathon reveals that he had accompanied Captain Templeton and Wilson to Shirin's village a decade ago in search of the jewels. While Shirin's mother, the guardian of the tomb, showed them inside, Captain Templeton went mad and shot and murdered the villagers. Shirin's mother upon hearing the gunshots, lashed out at Johnathon. There was a struggle in which he accidentally killed her. He returned with them so that he could return the jewels as he believes that he is cursed. Miss Fisher therefore deduces that the unknown assailant is someone trying to protect Jonathon—whom she identifies as his real father, the Lofthouse's butler, Crippins. He emerges from the shadow of the tomb and attempts to steal the jewels but is stopped by Jonathon who holds him hostage while the others escape from the collapsing tomb walls.

Miss Fisher tells Lord Lofthouse the truth about Jonathon and later says goodbye to Shirin. After pretending to shoot a spider to appease Miss Fisher's fears, Jack has a heart-to-heart talk with Phryne about their relationship. He tells her that he doesn't need to marry her, he just needs her heart and she declares she had already given it to him. They spend the night together.

In a mid-credits scene, Phryne receives a letter announcing that her husband, whom she married to help him secure his kingdom (while he was in love with someone else), has been murdered.

== Cast ==
- Essie Davis as Phryne Fisher
- Nathan Page as Detective Inspector Jack Robinson
- Miriam Margolyes as Prudence Stanley
- Ashleigh Cummings as Dot Collins née Williams
- Hugo Johnstone-Burt as Hugh Collins
- Rupert Penry-Jones as Jonathon Lofthouse
- Daniel Lapaine as Lord Lofthouse
- Jacqueline McKenzie as Lady Lofthouse
- Kal Naga as Sheikh Kahlil Abbas
- John Waters as Professor Linnaeus
- Izabella Yena as Shirin Abbas
- Nicole Chamoun as Shirin's Mother
- John Stanton as Crippins
- William Zappa as Assistant Commissioner Forsythe
- Ian Bliss as Vincent 'Monty' Montague
- Brice Bexter as Captain Harry Templeton
- Anthony Sharpe as Cecil Yates
- Travis McMahon as Bert Johnson

== Production ==
A stand-alone mystery-adventure feature film, Miss Fisher and the Crypt of Tears picks up the story from the end of the third series. It began production in October 2018 and stars Essie Davis, Nathan Page, and other members of the original television series, along with new guest stars Rupert Penry-Jones, Daniel Lapaine and Jacqueline McKenzie. The film is budgeted at $8 million and was directed by Tony Tilse. It wrapped production in late November 2018.

Since 2016, there had been speculation on the possibility that the television series would be made into a feature film. In May 2016, Essie Davis acknowledged interest in playing Miss Fisher in a film. "[We're] just working out the ideas of how to make it bigger and better and more fabulous than the TV show," she said. Later that year, it was revealed that plans were afoot to produce a trilogy of Phryne Fisher films.

In April 2017, a photo was published on the official Miss Fisher Murder Mysteries Instagram account showing Essie Davis and Nathan Page holding advance copies of a film script titled Miss Fisher and the Crypt of Tears. On 14 September 2017, a crowdfunding campaign was launched on Kickstarter in support of the film. On 15 December 2017, an additional ongoing crowdfunding campaign was begun through IndieGoGo in order to allow fans to continue supporting the effort. The original campaign reached its goal of $250,000 in less than 48 hours.

Following the success of the Miss Fisher and the Crypt of Tears crowdfunding campaign, Essie Davis reflected on Phryne's appeal to fans: "I think there are many elements to why fans love 'Miss Fisher', but I'm sure it's Phryne's independence with joy. There's something so attractive about being around a happy person". She added, "That burst between Jack and Phryne, there's nothing more attractive that you want to lean into than watching people fall in love with each other." In an interview with The Mercury Davis elaborated, "It kind of blows my mind how big that fanbase is around the world. I get letters from a lot of Americans and South Americans, from all over. Paper letters! For many people, it's been a lifeline."

In September 2019 the first teaser trailer for the film was aired on Sunrise. The full trailer was released in Australia in early December, 2019.

The film's soundtrack, by composer Greg J. Walker, was released on 21 February 2020.

== Release ==
Miss Fisher and the Crypt of Tears had its world premiere at the Palm Springs International Film Festival on 4 January 2020. The premiere was the first of three sold out screenings at the festival.

The film was released in Australia by Roadshow Films on 27 February 2020. It premiered in Sydney on 20 February 2020 at the Hayden Orpheum Picture Palace and in Melbourne on 23 February 2020 at the Village Rivoli.

Acorn TV released the film in North America, the streaming service's first venture into theatrical distribution after buying "the film sight unseen". Acorn TV released a US trailer 7 February 2020. The US theatrical release began 13 March 2020 in 40 cities and theaters across the country, including New York, Los Angeles, San Francisco, Chicago, and Seattle. It began streaming on Acorn TV from 23 March 2020.

In New Zealand, the theatrical release began on 23 April 2020. For all other countries, All3 Media International handled international sales and began selling the title following its Australian release.

The film was broadcast on ABC TV in June 2022, split into two "episodes" over two weeks.

== Reception ==
=== Box office ===
In the film's opening weekend in Australia, it grossed $1.24 million AU, including paid preview screenings. It added A$639,000 in the second weekend for a cumulative total of A$2.3 million.

=== Critical response ===
Miss Fisher and the Crypt of Tears was met with mixed reviews in Australia but more uniformly positive response from US critics. On Rotten Tomatoes, the film holds an approval rating of 67% based on 21 reviews.

=== Accolades ===
The AWGIE Awards, sponsored by the Australian Writers' Guild, nominated Miss Fisher and the Crypt of Tears screenwriter Deb Cox for best feature film adaptation.
