= Anthony Sharpe =

Australian actor, producer and singer (born 1974)

Anthony J Sharpe
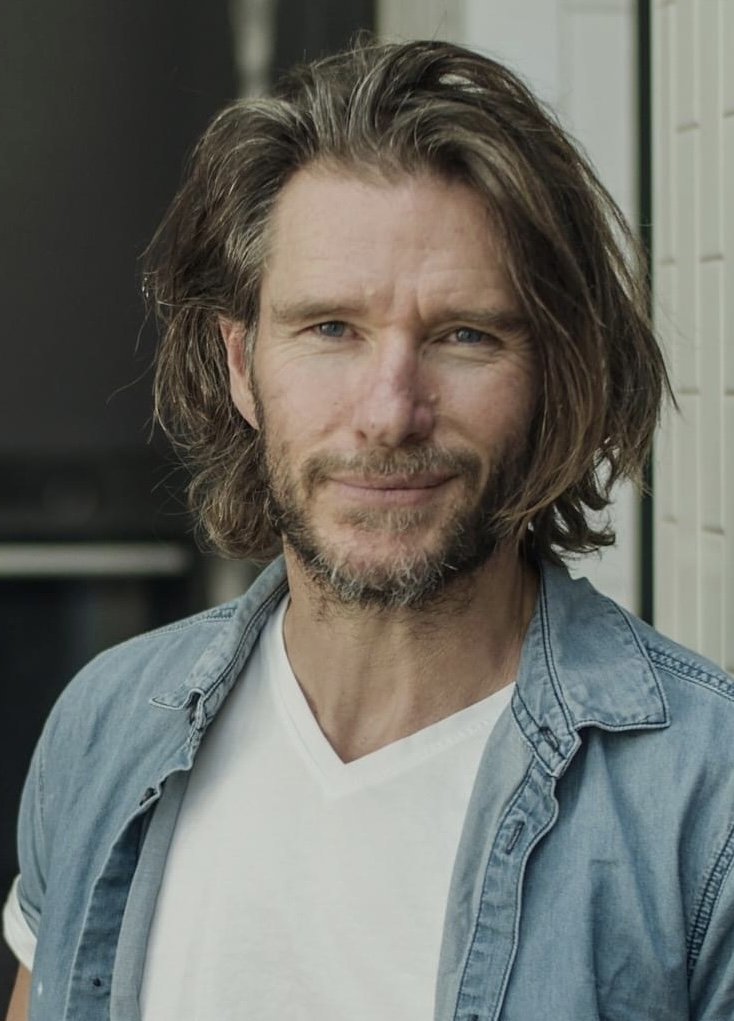
- Born: Anthony J Sharpe; 24 September 1974 (age 52); Melbourne, Victoria, Australia
- Occupations: Actor, singer, producer
- Years active: 1998–present
- Known for: Detective in Miss Fisher's Murder Mysteries
- Notable work: Miss Fisher and the Crypt of Tears
- Television: Miss Fisher's Murder Mysteries; City Homicide; Wentworth
- Height: 180 cm (5 ft 11 in)
- Spouse: Julie Sharpe
- Children: 1
- Musical career
- Genres: Pop; rock
- Instrument: Guitar
- Website: http://www.anthonyjsharpe.com/

Notes
- VIAF ID: 30146634288341930127

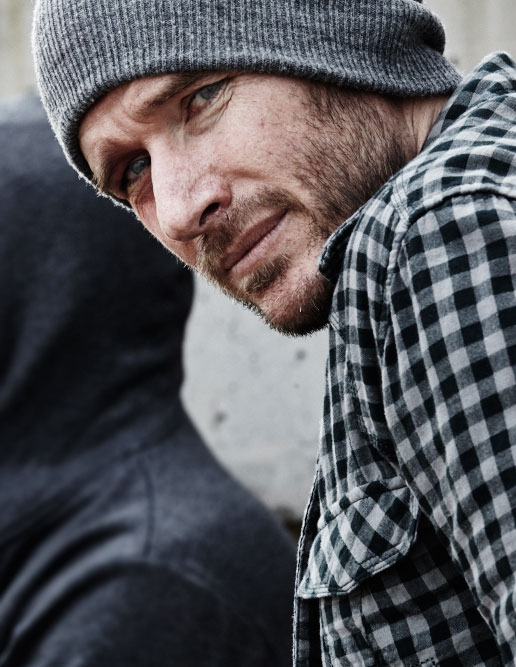
Sharpe on set filming There's a Bluebird in My Heart

Anthony J Sharpe (born 24 September 1974) is an Australian actor, producer and singer, best known for his role playing the character of Cecil Yates (Cec) on ABC1's Miss Fisher's Murder Mysteries. He became involved in acting after a lengthy career as a professional singer.

== Early life ==
Born to parents Joy and Joe as the youngest of four children, Sharpe grew up on the family's small farm in Willowmavin, Victoria.

Sharpe started playing guitar at the age of fifteen, forming his first band 'Vandals Rampage', with some school friends. A year later, he joined his second band 'The Lost Boys', performing a successful first gig at the Battle of the bands in Kilmore. He then filled in as a singer with another band, ‘Amon Rah’ and took singing lessons to further hone his skills, before joining covers band ‘Dexter’, playing to larger crowds in Melbourne.

After finishing an apprenticeship at Holdens Engine Company as a fitter and machinist, Sharpe left the company to pursue music full-time. His band Heavy Human Traffic recorded several albums and appeared on the first season of Starstruck, to critical acclaim, before later disbanding in 2003.

== Career ==
While working at Dracula's Theatre Restaurant, Sharpe met actor Brett Swain, who encouraged him to pursue acting. Soon thereafter, he landed his first television role on Blue Heelers (2002), which led to further guest roles in Neighbours (2005) and City Homicide (2010).

During this time, Sharpe also formed the band ‘Action Sam’, going on to do an eleven year residency at Melbourne's European Bier Café. He also auditioned for reality TV series Rock Star: INXS, competing to be the band's new lead singer. As one of the top 20 contestants, he travelled to LA, where he met and collaborated with some of America’s top producers.

In 2011, Sharpe landed the ongoing role of Cecil Yates (Cec) in ABC1 detective comedy-drama series Miss Fisher's Murder Mysteries, appearing for all three seasons, through to 2013.

Sharpe acted in several Australian independent films and short films and also performed in his first play in the 2016 Short+Sweet Festival, winning an award for Best Actor. The following year, he appeared as Detective Foy in an episode in Wentworth.

In 2019, Sharpe played the role of Jacobus Crier in action drama film Robert the Bruce, the sequel to 1995 Mel Gibson film Braveheart. The following year, he appeared in the role of Cash in horror film Black Water: Abyss, about a group of friends encountering killer crocodiles while exploring a remote cave system. He also reprised his role as Cec from Miss Fisher's Murder Mysteries, in 2020 film Miss Fisher and the Crypt of Tears. In 2021, he appeared in the first season of American series Nova Vita, with Titus Welliver and Dean Norris.

In 2022, Sharpe joined the supporting cast of NBCUniversal miniseries Joe vs. Carole, based on the real-life rivalry between zoo operator Joe Exotic and big-cat rescuer Carole Baskin. He appeared opposite Kate McKinnon, Kyle McLachlan and David Wenham in the role of Erik Cowie.

The following year, Sharpe played the recurring role of Billy Hopkins in the first season of crime drama series Black Snow, alongside Travis Fimmel. He also had a recurring role as Manfred in six episodes of Bay of Fires, appearing opposite Marta Dusseldorp. In 2024, he joined the main cast of crime series Human Error, in the role of Keith Bird.

Sharpe featured as Slim in 2024 sports drama film Kid Snow, opposite Phoebe Tonkin and Nathan Phillips. The same year, he also appeared as Austin Benton in western feature The Unholy Trinity, opposite Samuel L. Jackson.

Sharpe most recently appeared in the Emmy Award-nominated series Deadloch.

== Filmography ==
=== Television ===
Year	Title	Role	Notes	Ref.
1998	Blue Heelers	Dogger	1 episode	
2000	Stingers	Addict	1 episode	
2003	Neighbours	Jason Kimberly	1 episode	
2010	City Homicide	Craig Rammage	1 episode	
2011–2013	Miss Fisher's Murder Mysteries	Cecil Yates (Cec)	29 episodes	
2017	Wentworth	Detective Foy	1 episode	
2017	Murder	Jake Hemmingway	1 episode	
2019	Snappers	Garrath		
2020	Perfect Chaos	Peter	3 episodes	
2021	Nova Vita	Tommy	1 episode	
2021	Fires	Brendan Dodds	2 episodes	
2021	Closure	Detective	Miniseries	
2022	Joe vs. Carole	Erik Cowie	5 episodes	
2022	Fisk	Gordon	1 episode	
2023	Black Snow	Billy Hopkins	3 episodes	
2023	Bay of Fires	Manfred	6 episodes	
2024	Human Error	Keith Bird	6 episodes	
2026	Deadloch	DJ Darrell		

=== Films ===
Year	Title	Role	Notes	Ref.
2007	Hotel Motel	Gary Brahme	Short film	
2010	Out of Order	Chef	Short film	
2015	There's a Bluebird in My Heart	Miles	Short film	
2016	Oh, Brother	Malcom	Short film	
2017	Carp Made the River Green	Paul	Short film	
2017	7 Storeys Down	Sig		
2018	Mutt	Keith		
2018	Robert the Bruce	Jacobus Cryer		
2018	Schnook	Cooper		
2018	Miss Fisher and the Crypt of Tears	Cecil Yates		
2018	Initiation	Jasper		
2018	The Orchard	Henry		
2019	Loren	Detective		
2019	Nulla	Ray Starky		
2020	Black Water: Abyss	Cash		
2024	Kid Snow	Slim		
2024	The Unholy Trinity	Austin Benton		

== Awards and nominations ==
Year	Work	Award	Category	Result	Ref.
2012	Miss Fisher's Murder Mysteries	Equity Ensemble Awards	Most Outstanding Performance by an Ensemble in a Comedy Series	Nominated	
