= Cocaine Blues (novel) =

1989 novel by Kerry Greenwood

- Author: Kerry Greenwood
- Language: English
- Series: Phryne Fisher
- Publisher: McPhee Gribble
- Publication date: 1989
- Publication place: Australia
- Media type: Print (hardcover)
- ISBN: 0-86914-172-4 McPhee Gribble; 0-449-14733-9 Fawcett Publications
- OCLC: 27602170
- Preceded by: N/A
- Followed by: Flying Too High

Cocaine Blues is a crime novel by Kerry Greenwood, first published in Australia in 1989 by McPhee Gribble, in the United States in 1991 under the title of Death By Misadventure by Fawcett Publications, and in the United Kingdom in 2005 under the title of Miss Phryne Fisher Investigates by Constable and Robinson Crime. It is the first novel featuring Phryne Fisher.

== Plot introduction ==
After the Honourable Phryne Fisher solves a country-house jewel robbery in record time, she is asked by Colonel and Mrs. Harper to look into the matter of their daughter in Australia, who they fear may be being poisoned by her husband. Having grown bored with English social life, Phryne is happy to have an excuse to put off making decisions about her future for the next few months or so, and promptly relocates to Melbourne.

== Plot summary ==
Cocaine Blues opens with a theft at the country house belonging to Phryne Fisher's family, during a dinner party described as the 'social event of the year'. A valuable diamond necklace belonging to a guest is stolen, and Phryne is able to identify the thief and recover the necklace based on her observations of the room, and of the guests during dinner. Following this, Phryne is asked by Colonel Harper and his wife to travel to Australia to determine if their son-in-law, John Andrews, is poisoning their daughter, Lydia. The Harpers give Phryne some letters from Lydia. Phryne notes that the letters contain complaints about John and financial and investment advice to Lydia's parents. She also notes a reference to a Turkish bath run by a Madame Breda.

Phryne accepts the Harpers' request and travels to Melbourne, Australia, which is also the place of her birth. She is joined on the voyage by Dr. Elizabeth Macmillan, a surgeon on her way to take up a position at the Queen Victoria Hospital, and an old acquaintance of Phryne's from her time serving as the driver of an ambulance unit in France during World War I. In Melbourne, Phryne meets Cec and Bert, two cab drivers, at the docks, and engages them to drive her to the Windsor Hotel, where she stays for the duration of the novel. Soon after her arrival, Phryne meets Dorothy 'Dot' Williams and prevents her from committing an assault on her ex-employer's son, who had molested her and had her fired when she rebuffed his advances. Phryne engages Dot to work as her personal maid and social secretary instead.

Once in Melbourne, Phryne visits members of local society, and secures an invitation to a dinner party where she meets Lydia Andrews. She also meets Bobby Matthews, the thief she had exposed back in England, a Russian countess who styles herself as Princesse de Grasse, and twin Russian ballet dancers, Sasha De Lisse and his sister Elli. It is later revealed to Phryne that De Lisses' mother was the Princess' daughter, and she died of cocaine addiction in Paris. The three have since dedicated themselves to finding and exposing cocaine traders. Phryne establishes a friendship with Lydia Andrews, despite disliking her clinging and apathetic behaviour and secures an invitation to Lydia's house for lunch. She dances a tango with Sasha De Lisse and later rescues him from thugs after he attempts to independently track down the distributor of cocaine in Melbourne, a person known as the 'King of Snow'. Phryne tentatively agrees to collaborate with the Russians, despite some misgivings about their honesty and intentions.

Along with the Princesse de Grasse, Phryne visits the Turkish Baths run by Madame Breda. The Princess tells Phryne that the baths are a distribution center for cocaine and they purchase a small parcel of cocaine. Phryne dispatches this parcel to Dr. Macmillan to be analysed, but finds that a similar parcel has been planted in a room at the hotel. She dispatches the second parcel as well and replaces it with a decoy parcel of sodium bicarbonate. Later, when her hotel room is raided by Inspector Jack Robinson following an anonymous tip, she and the Inspector discover that a police constable Ellis had been blackmailed into planting another parcel of cocaine in her room. Dr. Macmillan confirms that one parcel contained cocaine, but that the other contained ordinary table salt. Following her lunch with Lydia Andrews, Phryne suspects she may have been poisoned but administers an emetic to herself and recovers in her hotel room. She later convinces Lydia's maid to secure nail and hair clippings from Lydia and has them analysed by Dr. Macmillan to show slow arsenic poisoning. On conversation with Bobby Matthews, and on the basis of overheard conversations with Lydia Andrews and her friends, she discovers that Lydia has a keen head for business while her husband does not.

Phryne then dresses up as a prostitute and, accompanied by Bert, visits a local bar where she has heard cocaine is being distributed. They locate the distributors after Sasha, unaware of Phryne's presence, gets into an altercation with them. Phryne follows the distributor and Sasha to the Turkish Baths, where they catch and confine both, Sasha and Phryne. Here Phryne's suspicions are confirmed when it is revealed that Lydia Andrews is the King of Snow and has been administering mild and non-fatal doses of arsenic to herself to redirect suspicion away from herself after her proposed poisoning of her husband. Lydia attempts to convince Phryne that she should join Lydia in the business, but Phryne and Sasha pretend to engage in sexual activities to take advantage of Lydia's distaste for any kind of sexual contact to distract her and disarm her. Meanwhile, Dot, Dr. Macmillan and a local MP are sent an indirect message by Phryne and they alert the police, allowing Inspector Robinson to arrest Lydia as well as the distributors. The book ends with a dinner party hosted by Phryne.

A sub-plot concerns the breaking of an illegal abortion racket. Early in the novel Bert and Cec are engaged by a mysterious man to drive a girl to her home, but on taking her in their cab, they discover she is injured and bleeding. Bert and Cec take the injured girl to Dr. Macmillan at her hospital, where it is revealed that her name is Alice Greenham and that she has suffered a botched abortion. Dr. Macmillan reports this incident to Inspector Jack Robinson at the Melbourne police station, who informs her that a disbarred doctor known as 'Butcher George' has been performing illegal abortions that frequently result in the deaths of his patients, however, without any surviving patient being willing to provide evidence, the police have been unable to catch him. Phryne, on hearing this from Dr. Macmillan, manages to track down Butcher George through one of Dot's friends, and helps set up a police operation that involves sending Woman-Police Officer Jones in as a decoy to entrap Butcher George. The operation is successful and Butcher George is caught. Cec, who has been taking care of Alice Greenham, proposes marriage to her at the end of the story, but Alice asks him to ask her again in six months so that she has a chance to put her life in order again.

== Characters in Cocaine Blues ==
- the Honourable Phryne Fisher
- Lydia Andrews, a well-off young married woman who falls ill whenever her husband is around
- John Andrews, a bully
- Butcher George, back-alley abortionist and rapist
- Alice Greenham, latest victim of Butcher George
- Bert (Albert Johnson), cabbie, friend of Cec, communist
- Dr. Elizabeth MacMillan, surgeon at the Queen Victoria Hospital for women.
- the Honourable Bobby Matthews, an amateur cricketer
- Detective-Inspector Jack Robinson, Melbourne police officer with middle-brown hair, and middle-brown eyes. Unremarkable in every way.
- Dorothy (Dot) Williams , hired by Phryne as confidential maid and social secretary
- Cec (Cecil Yates), friend of Bert and truck driver, soft-hearted and known for taking in strays of all kinds
- Sasha de Lisse a Russian dancer who has a grudge against drug dealers.
- Elli de Lisse twin sister of Sasha and his dancing partner.
- Princesse de Lisse a Russian born aristocrat in exile. Grandmother to the de Lisse twins.
- Madame Breda A strong, healthy German woman who runs a Turkish bath house and health palace.
- Gerda Madame Breda's much put-upon and bitter cousin.
- Woman-Police Officer Jones Smart and brave female officer on the Royal Victorian Police Force.

== Critical reception ==
Writing in The Sydney Morning Herald Anne Cranny-Francis called the novel "a gripping yarn". She acknowledged that the first chapter is a little awkward after which "the story rollicks along and no-one rollicks more than the tough by stylish Phryne Fisher." She concluded that it is "A great story, great detective, unputdownable."

== Publication history ==
After the novel's initial publication in Australia in 1989 by McPhee Gribble it was reprinted as follows:

- 1991 Ballantine Books, USA (under the title Death by Misadventure : A Roaring Twenties Mystery)
- 1992 McPhee Gribble, Australia
- 2000 Bolinda Publishing, Australia
- 2005 Allen & Unwin, Australia
- 2006 Poisoned Pen Press, USA
- 2007 Poisoned Pen Press, USA
- 2012 Allen & Unwin, Australia

The novel was also translated into Russian in 1991, German in 1999, French in 2006, and Korean in 2016.

== Adaptations ==
Cocaine Blues, as well as other novels featuring Phryne Fisher, were adapted into the Australian television series Miss Fisher's Murder Mysteries. The television adaptation of this book was in Episode 1 of Season 1 of Miss Fisher's Murder Mysteries, and bore several differences from the original novel. In the television episode, an additional subplot is created concerning Miss Fisher's sister, Jane. In the novel, Phryne Fisher's sister is said to have died of diphtheria and starvation, however, in the television series, Phryne has frequent flashbacks to her youth and her sister, and a reference is made suggesting that Jane might have been murdered. It is additionally suggested that Phryne Fisher's interest in detective work may have been motivated by this.

== Notes ==
- Dedication: To my mother and father
- The author was interviewed by Marjorie Johnson for The Sunday Age as part of a group of first-time novelists.
