= The Broken Wheel =

1996 novel by Kerry Greenwood

- Author: Kerry Greenwood
- Language: English
- Genre: Young adult, science fiction
- Publisher: Moonstone
- Publication date: 1996
- Publication place: Australia
- Media type: Print (Paperback)
- Pages: 155 (first edition)
- ISBN: 978-0-7322-5621-0

The Broken Wheel is a 1996 young adult science fiction novel by Kerry Greenwood.

== Background ==
The Broken Wheel was first published in Australia in 1996 by Moonstone in paperback format. It won in a tie situation with Hillary Bell's Mirror, Mirror the 1996 Aurealis Award for best young-adult novel.

== Plot summary ==
After an apocalyptic event, the survivors have formed into groups. These include the Travellers, who trade in small goods; the medievalists in the enclave Thorngard; the Tribe, a loose gathering of nomads; and in the city the Breakers, who destroy every machine they find, blaming the machines for the disaster. Sarah, a child of the Breakers, joins with the Travellers in an attempt to save the world from destruction.

== Critical response ==
In a short review of the novel in SF Commentary Colin Steele noted that it involves "a quest to find the last computer [which] disintegrates into a Mills & Boon-type romance." He went on to state that the novel is "clearly influenced by Greenwood’s real life role-playing with the Society for Creative Anachronism, which may not be to the advantage of her writing."
