= Kerry Greenwood =

Australian author and lawyer (1954–2025)

Kerry Greenwood OAM
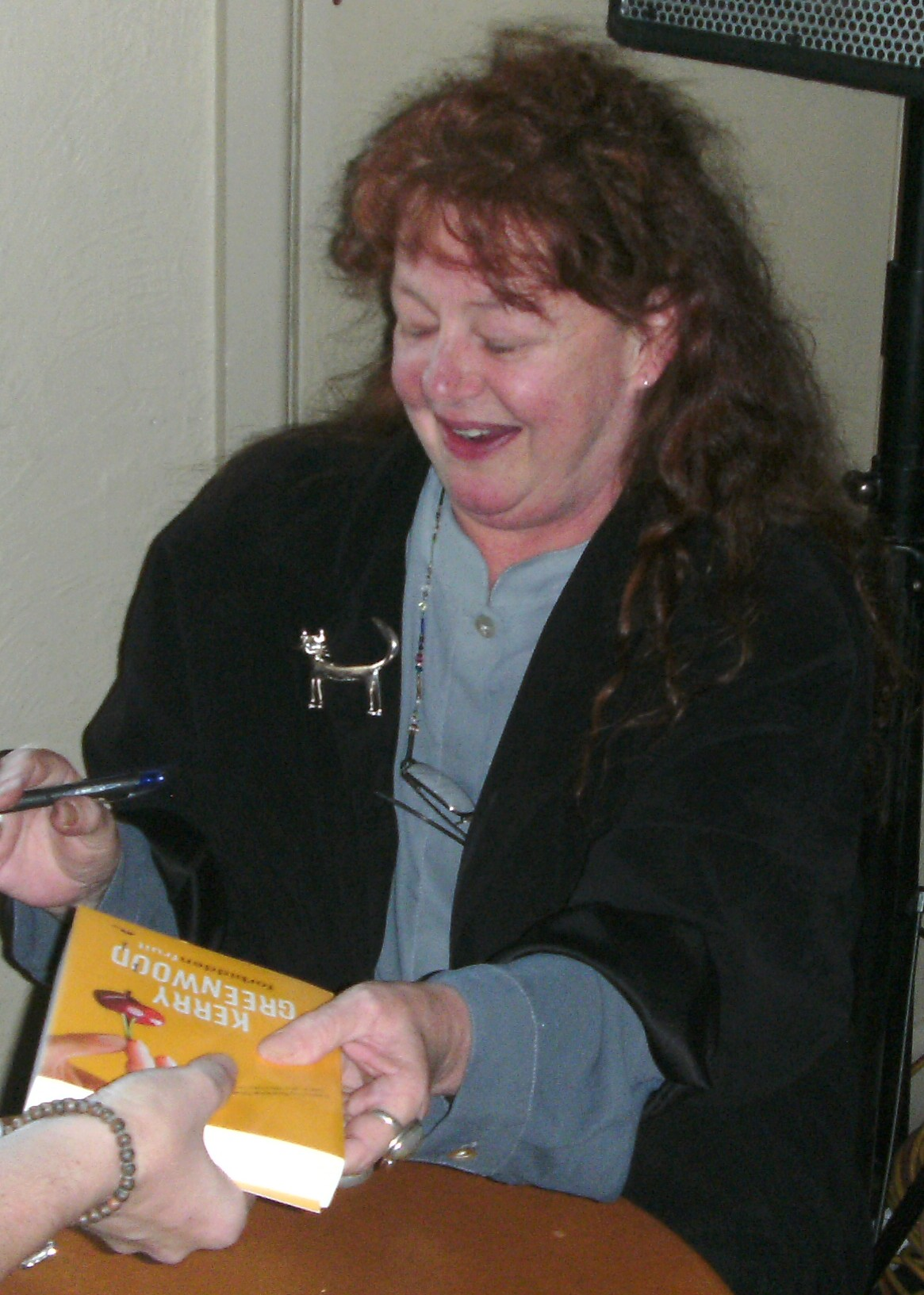
- Greenwood signing books at the launch of Forbidden Fruit
- Born: Kerry Isabelle Greenwood; 17 June 1954; Footscray, Victoria, Australia
- Died: 26 March 2025 (aged 70)
- Education: University of Melbourne (B.A., LL.B.)
- Occupations: Writer, locum solicitor
- Partner: David Greagg
- Writing career
- Language: English
- Genres: Crime, historical, science-fiction
- Notable work: Phryne Fisher series

Kerry Isabelle Greenwood OAM (17 June 1954 – 26 March 2025) was an Australian author and lawyer. She wrote many plays and books, most notably a string of historical detective novels centred on the character of Phryne Fisher, which was adapted as the popular television series Miss Fisher's Murder Mysteries. She wrote mysteries, science-fiction, historical fiction, children's stories, and plays. Greenwood earned the Australian women's crime fiction Davitt Award in 2002 for her young adult novel The Three-Pronged Dagger.

== Early life and education ==
Greenwood was born on 17 June 1954. She grew up in the Melbourne suburb of Footscray, and lived most of her life in the Inner West. She attended Geelong Road State School (now Footscray Primary School), Maribyrnong College and the University of Melbourne, where she graduated with Bachelor of Arts (English) and Bachelor of Laws degrees in 1979. Whilst at university, Greenwood worked at a women's refuge.

== Career ==
In 1982, Greenwood was admitted as a barrister and solicitor of the Supreme Court of Victoria, and worked full-time as a criminal defence lawyer for Victoria Legal Aid until becoming a professional writer. Since that time, she remained a locum duty solicitor for Legal Aid, practising in the Sunshine Magistrates' Court.

She began writing books at sixteen, but remained unpublished. In 1988 she entered one of her eight novels for the Vogel prize; although not successful, one of the judges offered her a contract for two detective novels.

In the 2020 Australia Day Honours Greenwood was awarded the Medal of the Order of Australia (OAM).

Her last Phryne Fisher book, Murder in the Cathedral was published in 2025, after her death. She had been editing it in March before dying in April. Kate Larsen, reviewing Murder in the Cathedral for The Guardian, described Phryne as "a fierce advocate, a kind benefactor and a radically forward-thinker who blasts through social norms with ideals a century ahead of her time". Larsen notes that First Nations people do not appear in the series, and that "a single fumbled sentence derails this otherwise enjoyable book".

== Personal life and death ==
Greenwood lived with a "wizard": the mathematician and author David Greagg.

Greenwood died on 26 March 2025, at the age of 70. Her publishers described her as having

two burning ambitions in life: to be a legal aid solicitor and defend the poor and voiceless; and to be a famous author. As a duty solicitor she was outrageously successful. As an author, even more so. Some of her earnings were spent on riotous living, but Kerry gave a lot of it away without fanfare ... Kerry was a costumier, a cook, an embroiderer and a seamstress who made most of her own clothes, as well as a chorister and a very wise and exceptionally kind woman. Passionate about history, literature, cats and Egypt – indeed, curious about almost everything

== Books ==
=== Phryne Fisher historical mysteries ===
1. Cocaine Blues (1989) aka Death by Misadventure
2. Flying Too High (1990)
3. Murder on the Ballarat Train (1991)
4. Death at Victoria Dock (1992)
5. The Green Mill Murder (1993)
6. Blood and Circuses (1994)
7. Ruddy Gore (1995)
8. Urn Burial (1996)
9. Raisins and Almonds (1997)
10. Death Before Wicket (1999)
11. Away with the Fairies (2001)
12. Murder in Montparnasse (2002)
13. The Castlemaine Murders (2003)
14. Queen of the Flowers (2004)
15. Death by Water (2005)
16. Murder in the Dark (2006)
17. Murder on a Midsummer Night (2008)
18. Dead Man's Chest (2010)
19. Unnatural Habits (2012)
20. Murder and Mendelssohn (2013)
21. Death in Daylesford (2020)
22. Murder in Williamstown (2022)
23. Murder in the Cathedral (2025)
- The Phryne Fisher Mysteries: Cocaine Blues / Flying Too High (omnibus) (2004)
- A Question of Death (short story collection) (2008)
- The Lady with the Gun Asks the Questions (short story collection) (2021)

=== Corinna Chapman mysteries ===
1. Earthly Delights (2004)
2. Heavenly Pleasures (2005)
3. Devil's Food (2006)
4. Trick or Treat (2007)
5. Forbidden Fruit (2009)
6. Cooking the Books (2011)
7. The Spotted Dog (2018)
8. Just Desserts (2026)

=== Delphic Women ===
- Cassandra (1995)
- Electra (1996)
- Medea (1997)

=== Spinouts (with Michael Pryor and Catherine Randle) ===
- The Bold and The Brave (2000)

=== Stormbringer ===
The Broken Wheel, Whaleroad, Cave Rats and Feral are prequels to the Stormbringer trilogy. Characters in Stormbringer refer to events in those books, but are otherwise independent.

- The Rat and the Raven (2005)
- Lightning Nest (2006)
- Ravens Rising (2006)

=== Novels ===
- The Wandering Icon (1992)
- The Childstone Cycle (1994)
- Quest (1996)
- The Broken Wheel (1996)
- Whaleroad (1996)
- Cave Rats (1997)
- Feral (1998)
- Whaleroad, Cave Rats and Feral published in one volume in 2002
- Alien Invasions (2000) (with Shannah Jay and Lucy Sussex, edited by Paul Collins and Meredith Costain)
- A Different Sort of Real: The Diary of Charlotte McKenzie, Melbourne 1918-1919 (2001), also titled The Deadly Flu as printed in 2012, and Contagion: My Australian Story, Scholastic Australia, 2020
- The Three-Pronged Dagger (2002)
- Danger Do Not Enter (2003)
- The Long Walk (2004)
- Journey to Eureka (2005)
- Out of the Black Land (2010)

=== Collections ===
- Recipes for Crime (1995) (with Jenny Pausacker)

=== Anthologies edited ===
- Bad to the Bones (2002)

=== Short fiction ===
- "Jetsam" (1998) in Dreaming Down-Under (ed. Jack Dann, Janeen Webb)
- "A Wild Colonial" co-written with Lindy Cameron (2017) in Sherlock Holmes: The Australian Casebook (ed. Christopher Sequeira)
- "Herotica: Adventures in Love and Time" (First published in paperback in Australia by Clan Destine Press, 2017: A collection of short stories of men in love with men throughout time.)

=== Non-fiction ===
- On Murder: True Crime Writing in Australia (2000)
- On Murder 2: True Crime Writing in Australia (2002)
- Tamam Shud: The Somerton Man Mystery (2012)

== Television and film ==
The Miss Fisher's Murder Mysteries television series was filmed in and around Melbourne in 2011 and premiered on ABC1 on 24 February 2012. A second series was commissioned in August 2012 and filming began in February 2013 and aired starting 6 September 2013. A third series was commissioned in June 2014 and began airing on 8 May 2015.

A film that continues the story started in the television series was released in 2022: Miss Fisher and the Crypt of Tears.

The TV series was redone by HBO Asia in 2020 as Miss S, set in Shanghai in the 1930s instead of Melbourne in the 1920s. The show was filmed in Mandarin, Miss Phryne Fisher was renamed as Su Wenli, Inspector Robinson was renamed as Luo Qiuheng, and Dorothy 'Dot' Williams was renamed as Xiao Tao Zi.

Ms Fisher's Modern Murder Mysteries (also stylised as Ms Fisher's MODern Murder Mysteries) is an Australian television drama series which began screening on the Seven Network on 21 February 2019. A spin-off of the original series, it is set in mid-1960s Melbourne, and revolves around the personal and professional life of Peregrine, daughter of Phryne’s half sister Annabelle. The premise is that Peregrine inherits a fortune when the famous aunt she never knew goes missing over the highlands of New Guinea, and she sets out to become a private detective in her own right, guided by the exceptional women in The Adventuresses' Club, of which her aunt was also a member.

== Awards and nominations ==
- Aurealis Award for Excellence in Australian Speculative Fiction, Young Adult Division, Best Novel, 1996: joint winner for The Broken Wheel
- Children's Book Council of Australia Book of the Year Award, Book of the Year: Younger Readers, 2002: honour book for A Different Sort of Real : The Diary of Charlotte McKenzie, Melbourne 1918–1919
- Davitt Award, Best Young Fiction Book, 2002: winner for The Three-Pronged Dagger
- Davitt Award, Best Young Fiction Book, 2003: nominated for The Wandering Icon
- Davitt Award, Best Adult Novel, 2003: nominated for Murder in Montparnasse : A Phryne Fisher Mystery
- Ned Kelly Award for Crime Writing, Lifetime Contribution, 2003
- Ned Kelly Award for Crime Writing, Best Novel, 2005: shortlisted for Heavenly Pleasures : A Corinna Chapman Novel
- Ned Kelly Award for Crime Writing, Best Novel, 2005: shortlisted for Queen of the Flowers : A Phryne Fisher Mystery
- New South Wales Premier's Literary Awards, Patricia Wrightson Prize for Children's Books, 2006: shortlisted for Journey to Eureka
- Davitt Award, Readers' Choice Award, 2006: joint winner for Heavenly Pleasures : A Corinna Chapman Novel
- Davitt Award, Readers' Choice Award, 2007: joint winner for Devil's Food
- Ned Kelly Award for Crime Writing, Best Novel, 2008: nominated for Trick or Treat
- Awarded Sisters in Crime Lifetime Achievement Award 2013 AU
