= Eton crop =

Short hairstyle for women

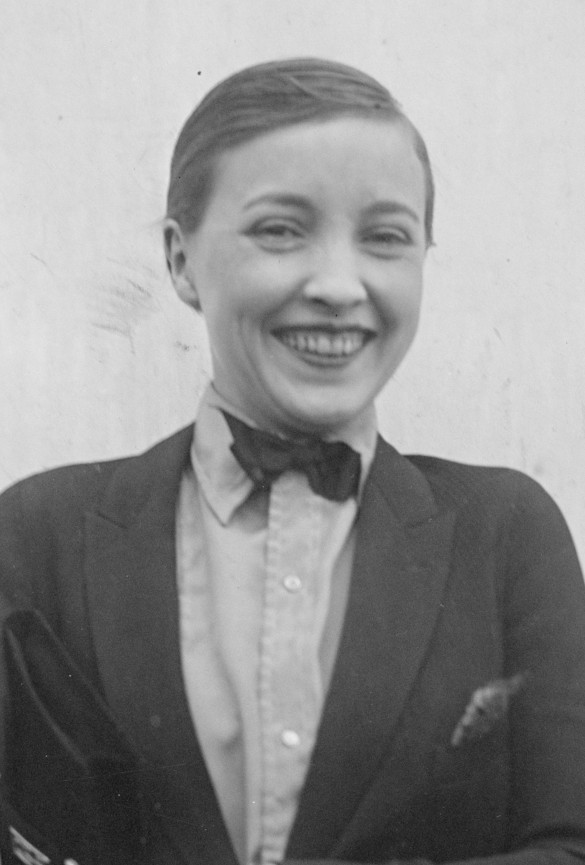
American-British actress Bessie Love with an Eton crop, 1925

The Eton crop is a type of very short, slicked-down crop hairstyle for women.

== Popularity ==
The dancer Irene Castle, fashion designer Coco Chanel, and actress/singer Polaire wore "bobs" in the 1910s. By the mid-1920s this hairstyle had become mainstream.

The Eton crop became popular during the 1920s because it was ideal to showcase the shape of cloche hats. It was worn by Josephine Baker, among others. The name derives from its similarity to a hairstyle allegedly popular with schoolboys at Eton.

== In culture ==
A critic reviewing a collection of society portraits notes: "Hairdressing is in a state of transition. There is an Eton crop, there are many soft shingles, and there are a few heads where the hair is being let grow."

In June 1927 Margot Asquith, Lady Oxford, derided: "Women with neither backs nor tops to their heads, and faces as large as hams, appear at the King's Drawing Rooms with the nuque of their necks blue from shaving...".

It was the haircut of choice for the more masculine lesbians in the lesbian subculture, particularly in England, during its time of popularity.

== See also ==
- List of hairstyles
