= Miss Fisher's Murder Mysteries =

Australian television drama series

- Title card
- Genre: Mystery; Crime; Historical costume drama; Historical mystery
- Created by: Deb Cox; Fiona Eagger
- Starring: Essie Davis; Nathan Page; Hugo Johnstone-Burt; Ashleigh Cummings
- Theme music composer: Greg J Walker
- Country of origin: Australia
- Original language: English
- No. of series: 3
- No. of episodes: 34 (list of episodes)

Production
- Executive producers: Deb Cox; Fiona Eagger; Christopher Gist; Carole Sklan
- Producers: Deb Cox; Fiona Eagger
- Production location: Melbourne
- Cinematography: Roger Lanser
- Running time: 60 minutes
- Production company: Every Cloud Productions

Original release
- Network: ABC1
- Release: 24 February 2012 – 26 June 2015

Miss Fisher's Murder Mysteries is an Australian detective comedy drama television series. It was first broadcast on ABC on 24 February 2012. It is based on author Kerry Greenwood's historical mystery novels, and it was created by Deb Cox and Fiona Eagger. The series revolves around the personal and professional life of Phryne Fisher (Essie Davis), a glamorous private detective in 1920s Melbourne. Three series have been broadcast, and a feature film titled Miss Fisher and the Crypt of Tears was released in February 2020. A television spin-off Ms Fisher's Modern Murder Mysteries was broadcast in 2019. Miss Fisher's Murder Mysteries has been aired in over 100 countries and territories.

== Plot and series ==
Miss Fisher's Murder Mysteries revolves around the personal and professional life of Phryne Fisher (Essie Davis), a glamorous private detective in late 1920s Melbourne. In the first series, a running theme is the kidnapping and death of Phryne's younger sister Janey when they were children watching a circus, a crime that still haunts Phryne, who feels she should have done more to protect her sister.

The first thirteen-part series was filmed over a six-month period in and around Melbourne from July 2011, and each episode had a budget of A$1 million. The drama has been bought by broadcasters in 120 countries and territories worldwide. A second series was commissioned in August 2012, and filming began in February 2013. The series began airing from 6 September 2013 and concluded with a Christmas special on 22 December 2013. A third series was commissioned in June 2014 and began airing on 8 May 2015.

== Cast and characters ==
=== Main ===
- Essie Davis as The Honourable Phryne Fisher, an independent, glamorous private detective, determined to solve any crime
- Nathan Page as Detective Inspector John 'Jack' Robinson, a police detective who works reluctantly with Miss Fisher
- Ashleigh Cummings as Dorothy 'Dot' Williams, Miss Fisher's paid companion, a devout Catholic in a relationship with Hugh Collins, who she marries late in series 3
- Hugo Johnstone-Burt as Constable Hugh Collins, Inspector Robinson's right-hand man and Dot's boyfriend, later husband
- Richard Bligh as Mr. Tobias Butler, Miss Fisher's loyal butler, and veteran of the Australian Imperial Force

=== Recurring ===
- Travis McMahon as Bert Johnson, ex-AIF veteran and a working-class devout communist who often assists in Miss Fisher's investigations
- Anthony Sharpe as Cecil 'Cec' Yates, ex-AIF, friend of Bert and working-class devout communist who often assists in Miss Fisher's investigations
- Tammy MacIntosh as Dr. Elizabeth 'Mac' Macmillan, Miss Fisher's close friend, doctor at a women's hospital in Melbourne, and a lesbian who sports fashionable menswear
- Miriam Margolyes as Prudence Elizabeth Stanley, Miss Fisher's aunt and a reputation-conscious society matron
- Ruby Rees-Wemyss as Jane Ross, Miss Fisher's ward who shares the same first name of Phryne's deceased sister, 'Janey' (seasons 1, 2)
- Nicholas Bell as Murdoch Foyle, a former university lecturer imprisoned after the disappearance of Miss Fisher's sister Jane (season 1)
- Pip Miller as The Baron of Richmond (Henry George Fisher), Phryne's father (season 3)

=== Guests ===
| Actor | Role | Ep. count |
|---|---|---|
| Aaron Jeffery | Samson | 1 |
| Andrea Demetriades | Beatrice Mason | 1 |
| Andrew Blackman | Roderick Gaskin | 1 |
| Anna McGahan | Miss Proust | 1 |
| Arianwen Parkes-Lockwood | Harriet Edwards | 1 |
| Brett Swain | Arthur Briggs | 1 |
| Caroline Brazier | Hetty | 1 |
| Craig Hall | Jefferson Clarke | 1 |
| Dan O'Connor | Vince Barlow | 1 |
| Dan Spielman | Dr Harcourt | 1 |
| David Berry | Alastair | 1 |
| Dee Smart | Rosie Sanderson | 3 |
| Diana Glenn | Mary Maddison / Velma | 1 |
| Ella Scott Lynch | Angela Lombard | 1 |
| Geoff Morrell | Bob Ryan | 1 |
| Greg Stone | Mr Sheridan | 1 |
| Heather Mitchell | Madame Fleuri | 1 |
| Jacek Koman | Mr Merton | 1 |
| Jack Finsterer | Peter the Painter | 1 |
| Jane Allsop | Delores | 1 |
| Jane Harber | Clara Whiting | 1 |
| John Brumpton | Finlay Ellis | 1 |
| John McTernan | Larry Dunn | 1 |
| Jonny Pasvolsky | Warwick Hamilton | 1 |
| Julia Blake | Hilly McNaster | 1 |
| Julie Forsyth | Mrs Bolkonsky | 1 |
| Kaiya Jones | Poppy | 1 |
| Kate Jenkinson | Isabella | 1 |
| Laura Gordon | Jemima | 1 |
| Laura Wheelwright | Alice | 2 |
| Lewis Fitz-Gerald | Professor Bradbury | 1 |
| Maeve Dermody | Eunice Henderson | 1 |
| Maria Mercedes | Madame Breda | 1 |
| Mark Coles Smith | Tom Derrimutt | 1 |
| Martin Copping | Constable Young | 2 |
| Miranda Otto | Lydia Andrews | 1 |
| Nell Feeney | Hilda Cobb | 1 |
| Nicholas Hope | Geoffrey Spall | 1 |
| Nick Carrafa | Pierre Sarcelle | 1 |
| Penne Hackforth-Jones | Reverend Mother | 1 |
| Philip Quast | Dr Hayden Samuels | 1 |
| Renai Caruso | Mrs Waddington | 1 |
| Robert Mammone | Guido Lupinacci | 1 |
| Rohan Nichol | Vic Freeman | 1 |
| Roz Hammond | Mrs Opie | 1 |
| Shareena Clanton | Lena | 1 |
| Terry Norris | Franklin D Weston | 1 |
| Toby Schmitz | Charles Freeman | 1 |
| Tony Rickards | Sergeant Baxter | 1 |
| Wendy Hughes | Adele Freeman | 1 |

== Production ==
=== Background ===
Head writer and producer of the series, Deb Cox, has said that she and Fiona Eagger were looking to adapt a crime novel for television and believed the Australian Broadcasting Corporation (ABC) were looking for a prime-time crime series for their network. The producers were disappointed by what they initially found and Cox explained: "It takes so long to raise the finance and script and produce a television series, so you need to feel it's worthwhile—both financially and philosophically. It was hard to find a reason to bring stories about psychotic killers and serial murderers to the screen." Cox and Eagger then came across Kerry Greenwood's Phryne Fisher murder mystery series and were drawn to them because of their diverse fan base.

Eagger said that they were curious to discover what made the series appeal to all generations. Eagger told a writer for IF Magazine, "We were a bit curious to know what it was about it that could appeal to a 16-year-old and a 70-year-old. Phryne is one of the first feminists. She chooses to live alone, she chooses not to get married. She's got many lovers. She's a bit of a James Bond action hero—she's much better dressed than James Bond though." Cox and Eagger realised that the novels reflected their moral values and fit in with their style of storytelling, so they began adapting them.

Cox and Eagger initially thought adapting novels would be easier than writing an original screenplay, but soon discovered that it was not. Speaking to Andrew Wrathall from Fancygoods.com.au, Cox stated,

"It takes a whole new set of skills to preserve what's most important in the stories, rationalise the impossible, gather what's left into a cohesive whole and still reflect the boundless worlds of imagination encouraged in the readers' minds by a few hundred words on paper—in a way that's achievable in production terms!"

She added that the restrictions tested their limits of creativity and inventiveness. Greenwood was invited to the first brainstorming session for the series and provided the producers with answers to their questions, and helped with the historical background to the novels. The author would read the scripts and help make corrections. Cox praised Greenwood's ability to write for the screen and accept the changes they made to the novels.

In June 2011, it was announced that the ABC had commissioned a thirteen-part series to air on their ABC1 channel the following year. The drama was originally titled The Phryne Fisher Murder Mystery Series, but was changed on the advice of distributor All3Media, who wanted to avoid having to tell international broadcasters how to pronounce Phryne's name.

=== Series 1 ===
The first series was filmed over a six-month period in and around Melbourne from July 2011. Greenwood had researched the history of the city "meticulously" for the novels, so the producers were keen to do the same. While they used some real locations, others were recreated, including a Turkish bathhouse and the Eastern Market. The interior of Phryne's house was built on a sound stage at the ABC's studio in Elsternwick. The historic house Wardlow in Parkville, Victoria was used as the exterior to the house. A number of National Trust houses provide settings including Rippon Lea Estate at Elsternwick, Labassa at Caulfield North and Como House in South Yarra. Each episode had a budget of $1 million. Eagger said "I wanted every cent on screen. I wanted the steam train, I wanted the plane, I wanted the ocean liner and the Hispano-Suiza. It stretched everyone, it really made people bleed." ABC TV, Film Victoria, Screen Australia and distributor All3Media funded the series.

=== Series 2 ===
The second series was approved for Screen Australia funding in July 2012. Filming began on 18 February 2013 in Melbourne. The shoot wrapped on 9 August.

On 6 August 2012, Michael Idato from The Sydney Morning Herald said that the ABC had commissioned a second series of Miss Fisher's Murder Mysteries. Idato reported the second series would go into production later in the year. ABC's Head of Fiction, Carole Sklan, stated

"ABC TV is delighted to be bringing a second series of Miss Fisher's Murder Mysteries to the screen. The first series proved an instant hit with viewers and Every Cloud Productions has again assembled a stellar cast and team for 13 more exciting, intriguing, and unpredictable mystery stories."

The second series is based on Greenwood's novels Dead Man's Chest, Unnatural Habits and various short stories. Cox commented that she and Eagger were "thrilled" that many of the cast and crew from the first series were returning. The second series premiered on 6 September 2013.

=== Series 3 ===
In February 2014, ABC TV channel controller Brendan Dahill told David Knox from TV Tonight that a third series of Miss Fisher's Murder Mysteries had yet to be commissioned. Dahill explained

The position we are in is an embarrassment of riches—tons of successful series and at some point Carole (Sklan, Head of Fiction) and I need to sit down and work out how many of the successful shows we can afford to return, without standing still, and still doing new stuff. Woven into that we obviously need to know how much money we think we're going to have.

Knox added that there were fears funds to the broadcaster could be cut. Colin Vickery, writing for news.com.au, reported that another reason Miss Fisher's Murder Mysteries had not been green-lit for a third series was due to ABC wanting to attract a younger audience. Vickery also said that if the show was given a third series it would not air until 2015.

On 13 June 2014, it was confirmed that Miss Fisher's Murder Mysteries had been commissioned for a third series. ABC renewed the series after a social media campaign run by fans of the show. The third series began shooting in mid-October 2014 in Melbourne and wrapped on 23 January 2015. Eagger told IF Magazine's Emily Blatchford that all of the cast would be returning, and admitted that the writers wanted to add some magic to the series and include an episode set in the military. She also hinted that there might be a wedding. Eagger added "It's a tough time for the ABC so we are thrilled they are able to bring us back, and to have that support from Film Victoria as well." The third series began airing from 8 May 2015.

=== Costumes ===
The costume designer for the series was Marion Boyce. She told ABC's Darren Smith that she loves the 20s and 30s and thought the opportunity to work on a show in her hometown (Melbourne) was "fantastic." Boyce had eight weeks' pre-production, but she said that she began putting stuff together early on. She stated, "After those eight weeks, we had 16 days to complete the next two episodes. It was a fast and furious process, and the series included circuses, bohemian nightclubs and the docks. Each episode is quite different from the rest." The costume department included one cutter, one sewer, a costume coordinator and a buyer who was also an art finisher. Boyce called the team "incredibly talented", as they had to do a lot of different jobs. The team, Mandy Murphy and Gareth Blaha, the head of the ABC's Costume Department, along with two milliners, made some of the hats. Boyce and her team created around 120 costumes for the series, including sleepwear, daywear, nightwear and special-occasion outfits.

Boyce explained that while vintage pieces were incorporated into the series, the department designed the majority of costumes. Cox told Alexandra Spring from Vogue Australia that some of the costumes were sourced from eBay and vintage shops. Cox said "Once you go back to the 1920s, things have either deteriorated or they are too small because the women were smaller, so it means a lot of it has to be made from scratch." The fabrics were taken from Boyce's own collection and fabric stores in Melbourne and Sydney. The designer admitted that parting with some of the fabrics was difficult, as she had had some of them for around 25 years. Boyce told Smith that at the end of filming, the costumes that were hired were returned: those made from fabric bought by the ABC were sent back to them, and those made from fabrics out of Boyce's own collection came back to her.

Boyce explained that Phryne is "completely fluid" and has "an extraordinary amount of energy", so she wanted her outfits to move with her when she went from room to room. When it came to Dot, Boyce designed her wardrobe with her religion and position in society in mind. Dot's clothes are more buttoned up, so she does not show off her body parts. Boyce commented, "She was a really nice contrast to Phryne and a lot more conservative. Dot has nice tweeds and cardigans."

== Episodes ==
| Series | Episodes | Originally released | |
| Series | Episodes | First released | Last released |
|---|---|---|---|
| 1 | 13 | 24 February 2012 | 18 May 2012 |
| 2 | 13 | 6 September 2013 | 22 December 2013 |
| 3 | 8 | 8 May 2015 | 26 June 2015 |

== International broadcast ==
Distribution of Miss Fisher's Murder Mysteries was acquired in 120 territories worldwide. The Canadian broadcaster Knowledge Network began airing the series at 8:30 pm on 5 October 2012. The UKTV network acquired the broadcasting rights to Miss Fisher's Murder Mysteries in the United Kingdom in September 2012. Series 1 premiered on the network's Alibi channel on 11 February 2013.

French broadcaster France 3 acquired Miss Fisher's Murder Mysteries in January 2013, while Alibi and the Knowledge Network renewed their deals to air Series 2. Alex Farber of Broadcast reported that Norway's TVNorge, Poland's Canal+, and Eastern Europe's Viasat networks had also picked up the show. In Germany, it is still (by 2023) aired by both ARD ONE and Servus TV. The series began airing on Italy's Rai 1 channel on 31 July 2013.

The series first became available in North America on Acorn TV only. Miss Fisher's Murder Mysteries premiered in the United States on PBS in 2013 with further stations broadcasting the series in the Autumn, and others more in 2014. The series premiered on Ovation in the US as well along with the PBS broadcast in 2016. The series still continues to air after it ended on PBS. Miss Fisher Uncovered, a behind-the-scenes special for American audiences featuring interviews with cast and crew, and author Kerry Greenwood, was broadcast in the U.S. in August 2015.

There has been minor censorship on at least some American Public Television stations. In the episode "Murder in Montparnasse", Miss Fisher had posed for a full frontal nude painting as a young woman. When the painting was seen in the episode, portions of it were blurred. There was no blurring on Netflix.

As of July 2017, the series had aired in 172 territories.

As of March 2018, Netflix held broadcasting rights for all three series in several countries, including the United States, Denmark, United Kingdom, France, Germany, Italy, Japan and Canada. It also held rights for the first two series in the Australian market in association with ABC TV and ABC Commercial.

== Home media ==
Miss Fisher's Murder Mysteries – OST, a CD collection featuring various artists used as music on the show, was released in Australia by ABC Commercial on 27 April 2012. The compilation included the series' theme music by Greg J. Walker. The selections were made available simultaneously on iTunes. The soundtrack for Series 2 was released on 15 November 2013, and for Series 3 on 1 May 2015. The official soundtrack for the series featuring music composed by Greg J. Walker was released on iTunes on 10 June 2014.

Episodes 1–7 were released on DVD in Region 4 on 3 May 2012, while episodes 8–13 were released on 7 June 2012. The series was also released on Blu-ray. Series 1 was released as a DVD box set by ABC Commercial in November 2012. Series 2 was released on DVD as a box set by Acorn Media on 27 May 2014. The complete series (1–3) was released as a DVD box set by ABC Commercial on 4 November 2015.

Miss Fisher's Murder Mysteries became available for streaming and VOD on Netflix in the U.S. in September 2014. It became available in the United Kingdom in June 2015, in Canada in March 2016, and in Australia/New Zealand in April 2017. The series became available on Amazon Video on 16 May 2016.

== Adaptations ==
=== Film ===
A stand-alone action-adventure feature film, Miss Fisher and the Crypt of Tears, picked up the story from the end of the third series. It wrapped production in November 2018 and stars Essie Davis, Nathan Page, and other members of the original television series, along with new guest stars Rupert Penry-Jones, Daniel Lapaine and Jacqueline McKenzie. The film was budgeted at $8 million and was directed by Tony Tilse.

=== Stage ===
The Sydney Theatre Company performed a stage play by Fiona Eagger and Deb Cox in May 2027, Death by Deckchair, directed by Daniel Evans and featuring Amber McMahon as Miss Fisher.

== Television spin-off ==
A television spin-off, titled Ms Fisher's Modern Murder Mysteries, was announced in July 2018 and first aired in 2019. The new series follows Phryne Fisher's niece, Peregrine Fisher, in mid-sixties mod-era Melbourne, as she inherits her aunt's home and car and becomes a private detective in her own right. The series aired on the Seven Network in Australia, followed by an international release. Geraldine Hakewill leads the cast as Peregrine Fisher. Joel Jackson is Detective James Steed, while Catherine McClements portrays "Birdie, an ex-member of WW2 Special Forces who is the president and mastermind of The Adventuresses' club".

=== International adaptations ===
A Mandarin language version of the television show was produced by the Shanghai 99 Visual Company, Tencent Penguin Film and talent management company Easy Entertainment. It consists of 30 episodes, starring Ma Yili and Gao Weiguang. Known as Miss S., the series is set in Shanghai in the 1930s. The creators of Miss Fisher's Murder Mysteries assisted in the making of this series. It first aired on August 28, 2020.

== Reception ==
While reviewing the first episode, David Brown from the Radio Times commented, "Just when you thought that all variations of the amateur-detective genre had been explored, along comes Miss Phryne Fisher, who sashays through the jazz clubs of late 1920s Ballarat, tackling villains with her pearl-handled pistol. The plot's hardly revolutionary, but it is worth watching for lead actress Essie Davis, with her sleek bob and killer cheekbones, who runs bad guys to ground with both wit and raunch."

=== Accolades ===
| Year | Award | Category | Recipients and nominees | Result |
|---|---|---|---|---|
| 2012 | Australian Production Design Guild Awards | Best Costume Design for Screen | Marian Boyce | Nominated |
| 2012 | Australian Production Design Guild Awards | Best Design on a Television Drama | Robert Perkins | Nominated |
| 2012 | Screen Music Awards | Best Music for a Television Series or Serial | Greg J. Walker | Nominated |
| 2012 | Screen Music Awards | Best Television Theme | Greg J. Walker | Nominated |
| 2013 | 2nd AACTA Awards | Best Lead Actress in a Television Drama | Essie Davis | Nominated |
| 2013 | Equity Ensemble Awards | Outstanding Performance by an Ensemble in a Drama Series | Series 1 cast | Nominated |
| 2013 | Logie Awards | Most Popular Actress | Ashleigh Cummings | Nominated |
| 2014 | 3rd AACTA Awards | Best Costume Design in Television | Marion Boyce | Won |
| 2014 | Equity Ensemble Awards | Outstanding Performance by an Ensemble in a Drama Series | Series 2 cast | Nominated |
| 2014 | Logie Awards | Most Popular Actress | Essie Davis | Nominated |
| 2014 | Logie Awards | Most Popular Drama Program | Miss Fisher's Murder Mysteries | Nominated |
| 2014 | Logie Awards | Gold Logie for Most Popular Personality on TV | Essie Davis | Nominated |
| 2015 | 5th AACTA Awards | Best Television Drama Series | Miss Fisher's Murder Mysteries | Nominated |
| 2015 | 5th AACTA Awards | Best Costume Design in Television | Marion Boyce | Nominated |
| 2016 | Logie Awards | Best Actress | Essie Davis | Nominated |
| 2016 | Logie Awards | Gold Logie for Most Popular Personality on TV | Essie Davis | Nominated |
| 2016 | Logie Awards | Most Outstanding Actress | Essie Davis | Nominated |
