= Logie Award for Most Popular New Talent =

Australian television award

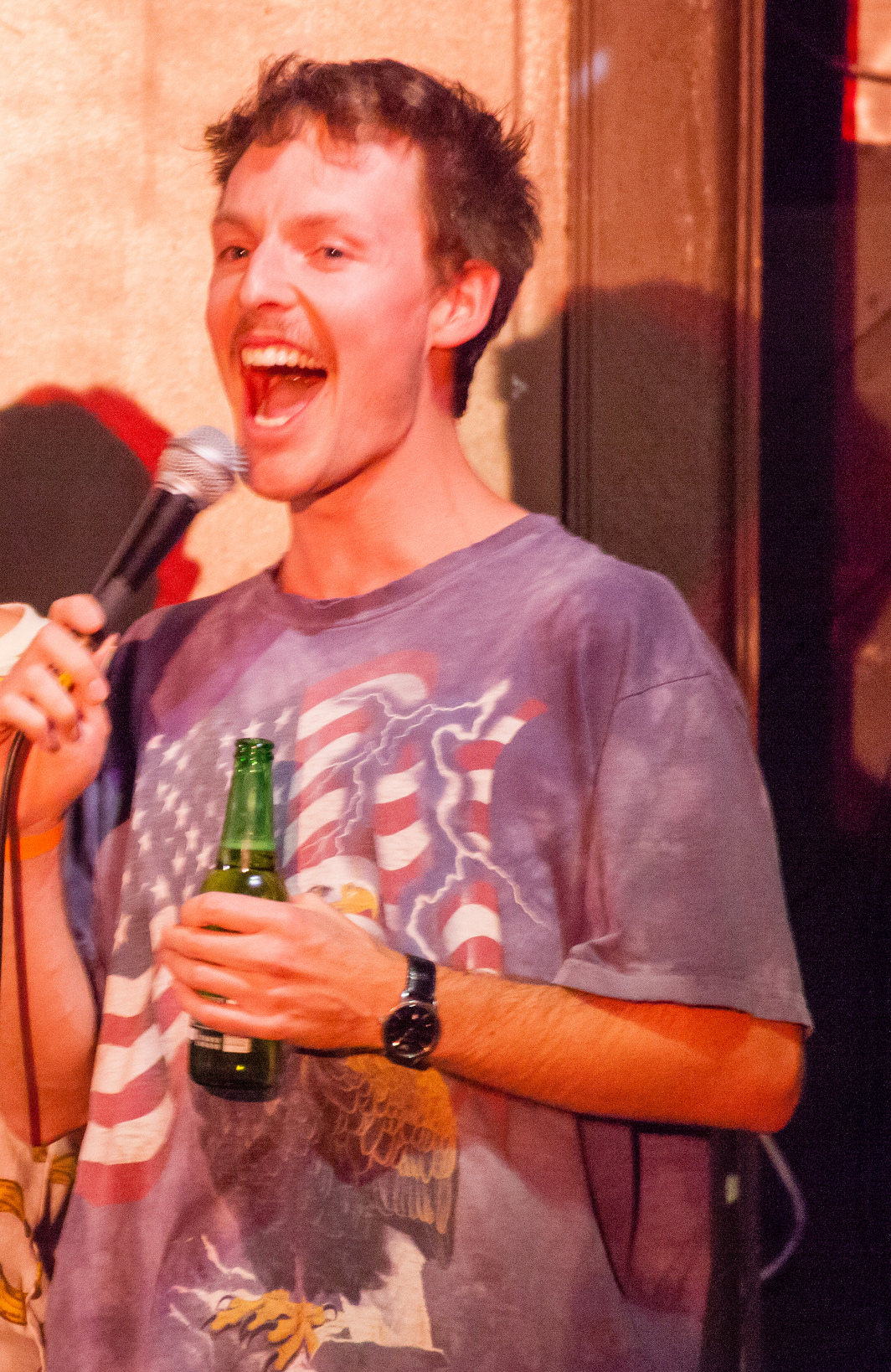
- Guy Montgomery is the most recent recipient
- Country: Australia
- Presented by: TV Week
- First award: 1980
- Currently held by: Guy Montgomery for Guy Montgomery's Guy Mont-Spelling Bee (2025)
- Website: www.tvweeklogieawards.com.au

The Silver Logie for Most Popular New Talent, also known as the Graham Kennedy Award for Most Popular New Talent, is an award presented at the Australian TV Week Logie Awards. The award recognises the popularity of a new talent in an Australian program. The program may or may not be the nominee's first television appearance, however it should be their first major television role.

It was first awarded at the 22nd Annual TV Week Logie Awards ceremony, held in 1980 and originally called Most Popular New Talent. This award category was eliminated in 1999 and replaced by the Most Popular New Male Talent and Most Popular New Female Talent categories. After a 15-year absence, the Most Popular New Talent category was reintroduced in 2014 to replace the gender specific categories. It was briefly renamed Best New Talent (2016–2017). From 2018, the award category name was reverted to Most Popular New Talent.

The winner and nominees of Most Popular New Talent are chosen by the public through an online voting survey on the TV Week website. Neighbours and Home and Away have the most recipients of this award, with four wins each.

== Winners and nominees ==
Key	Meaning
‡	Indicates the winner

Year	Nominees	Program(s)	Network(s)	Ref
1980	Vera Plevnik‡	The John Sullivan Story	Nine Network	
1981	Simon Gallaher‡	The Mike Walsh Show	Nine Network	
1982	Gary Sweet‡	The Sullivans	Nine Network	
1983	Stephen Comey‡	Sons and Daughters	Seven Network	
1984	James Reyne‡	Return to Eden	Network Ten	
1986	Peter O'Brien‡	Neighbours	Seven Network	
1987	Jason Donovan‡	Neighbours	Network Ten	
1987	Cameron Daddo	Perfect Match	Network Ten	
1987	Kylie Minogue	Neighbours	Network Ten	
1988	Alex Papps‡	The Henderson Kids II	Network Ten	
1988	Annie Jones	Neighbours	Network Ten	
1988	Kate Raison	A Country Practice	Seven Network	
1988	Christopher Truswell	Hey Dad..!	Seven Network	
1989	Nicolle Dickson‡	Home and Away	Seven Network	
1989	Rachel Friend	Neighbours	Network Ten	
1989	Rebecca Smart	The Shiralee	Seven Network	
1990	Georgie Parker‡	A Country Practice	Seven Network	
1990	Matt Day	A Country Practice	Seven Network	
1990	Marcus Graham	E Street	Network Ten	
1991	Richard Huggett‡	E Street	Network Ten	
1991	Rebekah Elmaloglou	Home and Away	Seven Network	
1991	Sophie Heathcote	A Country Practice	Seven Network	
1991	Sophie Lee	The Bugs Bunny Show	Nine Network	
1992	Kym Wilson‡	Brides of Christ	ABC TV	
1992	Matthew Krok	Hey Dad..!	Seven Network	
1992	Jeremy Sims	Chances	Nine Network	
1992	Melissa Tkautz	E Street	Network Ten	
1993	Simon Baker‡	E Street	Network Ten	
1993	Dieter Brummer	Home and Away	Seven Network	
1993	Natalie Imbruglia	Neighbours	Network Ten	
1993	Matthew Krok	Hey Dad..!	Seven Network	
1994	Melissa George‡	Home and Away	Seven Network	
1994	Kimberley Davies	Neighbours	Network Ten	
1994	Jo Beth Taylor	Australia's Funniest Home Videos	Nine Network	
1995	Lisa McCune‡	Blue Heelers	Seven Network	
1995	Daniel Amalm	Home and Away	Seven Network	
1995	Isla Fisher	Home and Away	Seven Network	
1996	Nic Testoni‡	Home and Away	Seven Network	
1996	Kate Fischer	What's Up Doc?	Nine Network	
1996	Katrina Hobbs	Home and Away	Seven Network	
1996	Wendy Mooney	Don't Forget Your Toothbrush	Nine Network	
1996	Vulcan	Gladiators	Seven Network	
1997	Tasma Walton‡	Blue Heelers	Seven Network	
1997	Belinda Emmett	Home and Away	Seven Network	
1997	Tania Zaetta	Who Dares Wins	Seven Network	
1997	Ben Unwin	Home and Away	Seven Network	
1998	Brooke Satchwell‡	Neighbours	Network Ten	
1998	Bree Desborough	Home and Away	Seven Network	
1998	Callan Mulvey	Heartbreak High	ABC TV	
1998	Daniel Kowalski	Plucka's Place	Nine Network	
2014	Bonnie Sveen‡	Home and Away	Seven Network	
2014	Timomatic	Australia's Got Talent	Nine Network	
2014	Abby Earl	A Place to Call Home	Seven Network	
2014	Caren Pistorius	Offspring	Network Ten	
2014	Caren Pistorius	Redfern Now	ABC1	
2014	Caren Pistorius	Paper Giants: Magazine Wars	ABC1	
2014	Johnny Ruffo	Home and Away	Seven Network	
2015	Miranda Tapsell‡	Love Child	Nine Network	
2015	Laura Brent	ANZAC Girls	ABC	
2015	Laura Brent	INXS: Never Tear Us Apart	Seven Network	
2015	Harriet Dyer	Love Child	Nine Network	
2015	Samantha Jade	INXS: Never Tear Us Apart	Seven Network	
2015	Olympia Valance	Neighbours	Network Ten	
2016	Adam Dovile‡	Better Homes and Gardens	Seven Network	
2016	Benson Jack Anthony	800 Words	Seven Network	
2016	Joel Jackson	Deadline Gallipoli	Showcase	
2016	Joel Jackson	Peter Allen: Not the Boy Next Door	Seven Network	
2016	Pia Miller	Home and Away	Seven Network	
2016	Dan Reilly	The Block	Nine Network	
2017	Rob Collins‡	Cleverman	ABC	
2017	Rob Collins‡	The Wrong Girl	Network Ten	
2017	Shalom Brune-Franklin	Doctor Doctor	Nine Network	
2017	Tiarnie Coupland	Love Child	Nine Network	
2017	Hayley Magnus	The Wrong Girl	Network Ten	
2017	Penny McNamee	Home and Away	Seven Network	
2018	Dilruk Jayasinha‡	CRAM!	Network Ten	
2018	Dilruk Jayasinha‡	Utopia	ABC	
2018	Matty Johnson	The Living Room	Network Ten	
2018	Sam Frost	Home and Away	Seven Network	
2018	Sophia Forrest	Love Child	Nine Network	
2018	Sophie Dillman	Home and Away	Seven Network	
2019	Dylan Alcott‡	The Set	ABC	
2019	Bonnie Anderson	Neighbours	Network Ten	
2019	Courtney Miller	Home and Away	Seven Network	
2019	Eddie Woo	Teenage Boss	ABC	
2019	Joe Jonas	The Voice	Nine Network	
2019	Tasia Zalar	Mystery Road	ABC	
2022	Tony Armstrong‡	News Breakfast	ABC	
2022	Alessandra Rampolla	Married At First Sight	Nine Network	
2022	Carlos Sanson Jr	Bump	Stan	
2022	Matt Evans	Home and Away	Seven Network	
2022	Melanie Bracewell	The Cheap Seats	Network Ten	
2022	Will Lodder	Love Me	Binge/Foxtel	
2023	Amy Shark‡	Australian Idol	Seven Network	
2023	Ayesha Madon	Heartbreak High	Netflix	
2023	Chloé Hayden	Heartbreak High	Netflix	
2023	Flex Mami	Love Island Australia	Nine Network	
2023	Kween Kong	RuPaul's Drag Race Down Under	Stan	
2023	Lilliana Bowrey	Surviving Summer	Netflix	
2024	Felix Cameron‡	Boy Swallows Universe	Netflix	
2024	Alyla Browne	The Lost Flowers of Alice Hart	Amazon Prime Video	
2024	Ava Caryofyllis	Bay of Fires	ABC	
2024	Imi Mbedla	Bay of Fires	ABC	
2024	Lee Tiger Halley	Boy Swallows Universe	Netflix	
2024	Tristan Gorey	Home and Away	Seven Network	
2025	Guy Montgomery‡	Guy Montgomery's Guy Mont-Spelling Bee	ABC	
2025	Hailey Pinto	Home and Away	Seven Network	
2025	Jenny Tian	Taskmaster Australia	Network 10	
2025	Kate Miller-Heidke	The Voice	Seven Network	
2025	Kylah Day	Territory	Netflix	
2025	Sofia Levin	MasterChef Australia	Network 10	
2026	Andrea Lam	The Piano	ABC	
2026	Eloise Hart	Goolagong	ABC	
2026	Eloise Hart	Mystery Road: Origin	ABC	
2026	Lila McGuire	Goolagong	ABC	
2026	Rowan Witt	Ghosts Australia	Paramount+	
2026	Stuart Broad	The Ashes 2025–26	Seven Network	
2026	Tamala	Ghosts Australia	Paramount+	

== Multiple wins ==
Number	Program
Wins
4	Home and Away
4	Neighbours
2	Blue Heelers
2	E Street

== See also ==
- George Wallace Memorial Logie for Best New Talent
- Graham Kennedy Award for Most Outstanding Newcomer
- Logie Award for Most Popular New Male Talent
- Logie Award for Most Popular New Female Talent
