= Tamala Shelton =

Australian actress

Tamala
- Born: Tamala Shelton; May 16, 1997 (age 29); Melbourne, Australia
- Occupation: Actress
- Years active: 2013–present
- Television: Ghosts

Tamala Shelton, also credited as Tamala, (born 16 May 1997) is an Australian television, stage and film actress, and spoken word performer. She portrays Kate in Australian comedy series Ghosts (2025), for which she was nominated for a Logie Award in 2026. As a child actress, she appeared in Nowhere Boys (2013-2015).

== Biography ==
From Boroondara, Victoria, and the daughter of a musician and music manager, Tamala is a first-nations actress and is a member of the Bundjalung people and Lama Lama people.

Having started performing on screen as a child actress with Upper Middle Bogan, she appeared in Nowhere Boys and revisited the character of Mia in the film continuation Nowhere Boys: The Book of Shadows in 2016 as an 18 year-old, four years after first portraying Mia. Having appeared in fantasy-drama series Cleverman, in which she played Alinta, in 2019, she could be seen as Petra in ABC series Reef Break.

In 2025, she had the lead role as Kate alongside Rowan Witt in supernatural comedy series Ghosts, an Australian adaptation of the British comedy series of the same name, filmed in Perth, Western Australia. For the role, she was nominated at the 2026 Logie Awards for the Logie Award for Most Popular New Talent, ultimately won by fellow First Nation actress Lila McGuire.

Alongside screen roles, Tamala has performed in the spoken word including a spoken-word rendition of Cradle of Life, by Archie Roach. Following his death, she took part in One Song: The Music of Archie Roach concert series with the Melbourne Symphony Orchestra. On stage, she had performed with the Melbourne Theatre Company. She has also recorded multiple First Nations audiobooks.

== Partial filmography ==
Year	Title	Role	Notes
2013	Upper Middle Bogan	Chloe	2 episodes
2013-2015	Nowhere Boys	Mia	19 episodes
2016	Nowhere Boys: The Book of Shadows	Mia	
2016-2017	Cleverman	Alinta	12 episodes
2019	Dark Place	Andy	
2019	Reef Break	Petra	13 episodes
2023	Late Night with the Devil	Carol	
2025	Ghosts	Kate	Lead role
