= Skull Murphy (disambiguation) =

Skull Murphy (born 1930) is a Canadian professional wrestler.

Skull Murphy may also refer to:

- Edward Francis "Skull" Murphy (born 1926), American professional wrestler for 2 years, bouncer for the Stonewall Inn
- Brian "The Skull" Murphy (born 1933), an Australian police detective
