= Ben Knight (actor) =

Australian actor (born 1985)

- Born: 1 December 1975 (age 50); Melbourne, Victoria, Australia
- Other name: Ben Kermode
- Occupations: Actor, writer, director, editor, composer, producer
- Years active: 1997–present
- Spouse: Natalie Walker

Ben Knight (born 1 December 1975) often credited as Ben Kermode, is an Australian actor.

== Early life ==
As a child, Knight's fascination with American films including Star Wars, inspired him to pursue an acting career. His father was a Jackaroo.

== Career ==
Knight commenced his career as an actor in 1997, when he made a guest appearance in the Australian television series State Coroner. Two further guest roles followed, on the series Good Guys, Bad Guys alongside Marcus Graham and comedy series Introducing Gary Petty before his acting career took a five-year hiatus.

In 2005, Knight returned to acting with the short film Smacked Out Kisses. He then landed an uncredited role in 2007 sci-fi thriller The Nines opposite Ryan Reynolds, before appearing in interfaith romantic drama David & Fatima, a love story set in the Middle East starring Martin Landau. In 2009, he starred in horror film Prey with Natalie Bassingthwaighte. and short film Rikki, in which he also served as director, writer, producer, editor and composer.

Knight next landed a short recurring role on Seven Network soap opera Home and Away, beginning in 2009, playing Hazem Kassir, the love interest of Leah Patterson-Baker. He played the role of Hazem until early 2010, when his character was involved in a controversial storyline, in which he was brutally beaten by a group of racist thugs on Australia Day.

Knight then went on to appear in long-running soap opera in Neighbours in 2011, in which he played the role of gardener Ivan DeMarco, a bad-boy love interest for Natasha Williams (played by Valentina Novakovic).

In 2013, Knight, guest-starred in an episode of US Nickelodeon sitcom See Dad Run, opposite Scott Baio, playing the role of Melbourne Max, an Australian stuntman. He also appeared in 2013 thriller feature, Paraphobia. That same year, after having written and directed four short films, his project Kidnappers premiered at the LA Comedy Fest and Trustin and the Ideas Machine, played at several film festivals, winning awards at the Mexico Film Festival and the International Festival of Cinematic Arts.

In 2025, it was announced that Knight is set to appear in ABC six-part crime drama miniseries Dustfall, alongside Anna Torv.

Knight's other credits include the short film Road to Ramadi, satirical black comedy series Review with Myles Barlow and drama series City Homicide.

== Personal life ==
Knight is married to Australian actress Natalie Walker. Together they co-produce and act in Knight's short film projects. The couple relocated to Los Angeles in 2007, to further their careers. They appeared together in 2009 film Prey, but concealed their relationship from casting directors whilst auditioning, fearing it might harm their chances of landing the roles.

== Filmography ==
=== Television ===
Year	Title	Role	Notes	Ref.
1997	State Coroner	Gang Member	1 episode	
1998	Good Guys Bad Guys	Peter Lubich	1 episode	
2000	Introducing Gary Petty	Ari	1 episode	
2009–2010	Home and Away	Hazem Kassir	8 episodes	
2010	Review with Myles Barlow	Private Detective	1 episode	
2010	City Homicide	Vinnie De Luca	1 episode	
2011	Neighbours	Ivan DeMarco	54 episodes	
2013	The Tonight Show with Jay Leno	Johnny Football / The Singing Bachelor	3 episodes	
2013	See Dad Run	Melbourne Max	1 episode	
TBA	Dustfall	TBA	Miniseries	

=== Film ===
Year	Title	Role	Notes	Ref.
2005	Smacked Out Kisses	Tony	Short	
2006	Road to Ramadi	Private Frank	Short	
2007	The Nines	Focus Group Participant #3	Uncredited	
2008	David & Fatima	Avi Weinstein		
2009	Prey	Matt		
2009	Rikki	Black	Short	
2012	Trustin and the Ideas Machine	Trustin	Short	
2013	Paraphobia	Mark Navarro		
2013	Kidnappers	George #1 / Joseph	Short	
2017	Just Do You	Bar Patron	Short	
