= Vikki Petraitis =

Australian true crime author

Vikki Petraitis is an Australian true crime author, podcaster, and educator. She is known for her investigative works on crime and justice, which has contributed to raising public awareness of crime and justice issues in Australia. Petraitis is also known for her 2022 novel The Unbelieved, which was shortlisted for a Davitt Award, and has been adapted for television in a 2026 six-part miniseries starring Anna Torv, titled Dustfall.

== Career ==
=== Writing ===
Petraitis has written extensively about Australian criminal cases, including infamous murders and police investigations. Her books and presentations often focus on real-life crimes, providing in-depth analysis and firsthand accounts from those involved, including law enforcement officers and victims' families. Her notable non-fiction books include The Frankston Murders, which examines the case of serial killer Paul Denyer, and Once a Copper, a biography of former police officer Brian "The Skull" Murphy. She has also contributed to various anthologies and crime-related publications.

She has also written crime fiction, achieving success with the novel The Unbelieved, published in 2022.

=== Podcasting ===
Petraitis has gained recognition for her true-crime podcasts, in which she delves into both well-known and lesser-known cases. She has regularly spoken on podcasts, including Australian True Crime, hosted by Meshel Laurie and Emily Webb. In September 2019, Petraitis was interviewed by Casefile for their From the Files podcast titled From Frankston to Philip Island.

She was also instrumental in creating the Casefile Presents series titled The Vanishing of Vivienne Cameron – a 10-episode podcast released in 2020 covering the case. In 2021, she also created and narrated a 9-episode podcast called Searching for Sarah Macdiarmid. In 2023, she researched and narrated an 11-episode series called The Frankston Murders given her knowledge of the crime based on her books of the same name. In 2025, alongside Emily Webb, she released another Casefile podcast called The Unthinkable, which explored "stories of people who have experienced unthinkable events but who have come out the other side, stronger and wiser".

=== Other activities ===
She has also hosted presentations, workshops, interviews, and true crime events.

== Awards ==
Petraitis was nominated for the 2007 Davitt Award for her book Forensics. Also in 2007, she won the Scarlet Stiletto Award for Best New Talent for a fiction piece she wrote called "Side Window".

She won the Readers' Choice Award and was shortlisted for the 2023 Davitt Award in Adult Novel for The Unbelieved.

== Adaptations ==
Petraitis' 2022 novel The Unbelieved was adapted for television in a six-part miniseries starring Anna Torv, titled Dustfall, which was released on 11 October 2026 on ABC Television.

== Books ==
- —— (1993). The Phillip Island Murder – The True Account of a Brutal Killing. Kerr Publishing. ISBN 9781875703098.
- —— (1995). Victims, Crimes and Investigators. Victoria Press.
- —— (1995). The Frankston Murders – The True Story of Serial Killer. Nivar Press. ISBN 9780646228280.
- —— (1998). The Great John Coleman. Nivar Press. ISBN 9780646316161.
- —— (2000). Rockspider – The Danger of Paedophiles – Untold Stories. Hybrid Publishers. ISBN 9781876462031.
- —— (2002). "Serial Killers are Losers". In Greenwood, Kerry (ed.). On Murder II. Black Inc.
- —— (2005). Cops – True Stories from Australian Police. The Five Mile Press. ISBN 9781741246087.
- —— (2006). Forensics – True Stories from Australian Police Files. The Five Mile Press. ISBN 9781741240801.
- —— (2008). "The Frankston Murders and The Paedophile Witch". Outside the Law. The Five Mile Press.
- —— (2008). Crime Scene Investigations – More Stories from the Australian Police Files. The Five Mile Press. ISBN 9781741784091.
- —— (2009). Salvation – The True Story of Rod Braybon's Fight for Justice. Jewel Publishing. ISBN 9780980621303.
- —— (2013). The Russell Street Bombing. Clan Destine Press. ISBN 9780987553812.
- —— (2015). The Dog Squad – Incredible True Stories of Courageous Police Dogs and Their Handlers. Michael Joseph. ISBN 9780143799641.
- —— (2018). Once a Copper: The Life and Times of Brian "The Skull" Murphy. Wild Dingo Press. ISBN 9780648066330.
- —— (2018). The Frankston Murders: 25 Years On.
- —— (2019). Inside the Law: 25 Years of True Crime Writing. Clan Destine Press. ISBN 9780648293712.
- —— (2020). Cops, Drugs, Lawyer X and Me. Hachette Australia. ISBN 9780733643804.
- —— (2020). Police Stories: Compelling True Stories from the Frontline of Australia's Police. Lake Press. ISBN 9780655219927.
- —— (2022). The Unbelieved. Allen & Unwin. ISBN 9781761067396.
- —— (2025). The Stolen. Allen & Unwin. ISBN 9781761471667.
- —— (2026). The Vanishing of Vivienne Cameron: Forty Years Searching for the Phillip Island Murderer. Simon & Schuster Australia. ISBN 9781761820830.
