= Logie Awards of 2024 =

Australian television awards ceremony

64th Logie Awards
- Date: 18 August 2024
- Site: The Star, Sydney, New South Wales
- Hosted by: Sam Pang
- Official website: tvweeklogies.com.au

Highlights
- Gold Logie: Larry Emdur
- Hall of Fame: Rebecca Gibney
- Most awards: Boy Swallows Universe (5)
- Most nominations: Boy Swallows Universe (10)

Television coverage
- Network: Seven Network

The 64th Annual TV Week Logie Awards ceremony was held on 18 August 2024 at The Star, Sydney, and broadcast on the Seven Network. The ceremony was hosted by Sam Pang, returning from the previous ceremony to the role.

== Winners and nominees ==
Nominees were announced on 23 June 2024.

=== Gold Logie ===
Most Popular Personality on Australian Television
- Larry Emdur in The Chase Australia and The Morning Show (Seven Network)
  - Andy Lee in The Hundred with Andy Lee (Nine Network)
  - Asher Keddie in Strife (Binge)
  - Julia Morris in I'm a Celebrity...Get Me Out of Here! (Network 10)
  - Robert Irwin in I'm a Celebrity...Get Me Out of Here! (Network 10)
  - Sonia Kruger in Big Brother, Dancing with the Stars, The Voice and Logies Red Carpet (Seven Network)
  - Tony Armstrong in News Breakfast and Great Australian Stuff (ABC)

=== Acting/Presenting ===
Best Lead Actor in a Drama	Best Lead Actress in a Drama
Felix Cameron in Boy Swallows Universe (Netflix); Hugo Weaving in Love Me (Binge); Rob Collins in Total Control (ABC); Rob Collins in RFDS (Seven Network); Sam Reid in The Newsreader (ABC); Simon Baker in Boy Swallows Universe (Netflix)	Deborah Mailman in Total Control (ABC); Aisha Dee in Safe Home (SBS); Anna Torv in The Newsreader (ABC); Phoebe Tonkin in Boy Swallows Universe (Netflix); Rachel Griffiths in Total Control (ABC); Sigourney Weaver in The Lost Flowers of Alice Hart (Amazon Prime Video)
Best Lead Actor in a Comedy	Best Lead Actress in a Comedy
Rob Sitch in Utopia (ABC); Ben Feldman in Population 11 (Stan); Bob Morley in In Limbo (ABC); Lincoln Younes in C*A*U*G*H*T (Stan); Matt Okine in Mother and Son (ABC); Ryan Corr in In Limbo (ABC)	Kitty Flanagan in Utopia (ABC); Celia Pacquola in Utopia (ABC); Danielle Walker in Gold Diggers (ABC); Denise Scott in Mother and Son (ABC); Kate Box in Deadloch (Amazon Prime Video); Madeleine Sami in Deadloch (Amazon Prime Video)
Best Supporting Actor	Best Supporting Actress
Bryan Brown in Boy Swallows Universe (Netflix); Guy Pearce in The Clearing (Disney+); Jay Ryan in Scrublands (Stan); Lee Tiger Halley in Boy Swallows Universe (Netflix); Stephen Curry in Bay of Fires (ABC); Travis Fimmel in Boy Swallows Universe (Netflix)	Sophie Wilde in Boy Swallows Universe (Netflix); Ariel Donoghue in Wolf Like Me (Stan); Kerry Fox in Bay of Fires (ABC); Leah Purcell in The Lost Flowers of Alice Hart (Amazon Prime Video); Mabel Li in Safe Home (SBS); Michelle Lim Davidson in The Newsreader (ABC)
Best News or Public Affairs Presenter	Graham Kennedy Award for Most Popular New Talent
Ally Langdon in A Current Affair (Nine Network); David Speers in Insiders (ABC); Liz Hayes in Under Investigation with Liz Hayes (Nine Network); Michael Usher in Seven News and Seven News Spotlight (Seven Network); Peter Overton in Nine News (Nine Network); Sarah Ferguson in 7.30 (ABC)	Felix Cameron in Boy Swallows Universe (Netflix); Alyla Browne in The Lost Flowers of Alice Hart (Amazon Prime Video); Ava Caryofyllis in Bay of Fires (ABC); Imi Mbedla in Bay of Fires (ABC); Lee Tiger Halley in Boy Swallows Universe (Netflix); Tristan Gorey in Home and Away (Seven Network)
Bert Newton Award for Most Popular Presenter
Larry Emdur in The Chase Australia and The Morning Show (Seven Network); Hamish Blake in Lego Masters (Nine Network); Julia Morris in I'm a Celebrity...Get Me Out of Here! (Network 10); Robert Irwin in I'm a Celebrity...Get Me Out of Here! (Network 10); Sonia Kruger in Big Brother, Dancing with the Stars, The Voice and Logies Red Carpet (Seven Network); Tony Armstrong in News Breakfast and Great Australian Stuff (ABC)

=== Programs ===
Best Drama Program	Best Miniseries or Telemovie
RFDS (Seven Network); Love Me (Binge); NCIS: Sydney (Paramount+); The Newsreader (ABC); The Tourist (Stan); Total Control (ABC)	Boy Swallows Universe (Netflix); Erotic Stories (SBS); Safe Home (SBS); The Claremont Murders (Seven Network); The Clearing (Disney+); The Lost Flowers of Alice Hart (Amazon Prime Video)
Best Entertainment Program	Best Current Affairs Program
The Voice (Seven Network); ABC New Year's Eve (ABC); Australian Idol (Seven Network); Dancing with the Stars (Seven Network); Take 5 with Zan Rowe (ABC); Vision Australia's Carols by Candlelight (Nine Network)	Australian Story (ABC); 60 Minutes (Nine Network); 7.30 (ABC); A Current Affair (Nine Network); Foreign Correspondent (ABC); Four Corners (ABC)
Best Scripted Comedy Program	Best Comedy Entertainment Program
Utopia (ABC); Deadloch (Amazon Prime Video); In Limbo (ABC); Mother and Son (ABC); Population 11 (Stan); Strife (Binge)	Have You Been Paying Attention? (Network 10); Gruen (ABC); Hard Quiz (ABC); Thank God You're Here (Network 10); The Weekly with Charlie Pickering (ABC); The Yearly with Charlie Pickering (ABC)
Best Competition Reality Program	Best Structured Reality Program
MasterChef Australia (Network 10); Alone Australia (SBS); Australian Survivor: Titans V Rebels (Network 10); I'm a Celebrity...Get Me Out of Here! (Network 10); Lego Masters (Nine Network); The Block (Nine Network)	Gogglebox Australia (Foxtel/Network 10); The Farmer Wants a Wife (Seven Network); Married at First Sight (Nine Network); Muster Dogs (ABC); Old People's Home for Teenagers (ABC); SAS Australia (Seven Network)
Best Lifestyle Program	Best News Coverage or Public Affairs Report
Travel Guides (Nine Network); Better Homes and Gardens (Seven Network); Gardening Australia (ABC); Love It or List It Australia (Foxtel); Restoration Australia (ABC); Selling Houses Australia (Foxtel)	"Ben Roberts-Smith: The Truth" (60 Minutes, Nine Network); "A Silver Lining: Silverchair" (Australian Story, ABC); "Bishop of Broome" (Seven News, Seven Network); "Israel-Hamas War" (Seven News, Seven Network); "Old School" (Four Corners, ABC); "The Forever War" (Four Corners, ABC)
Best Factual or Documentary Program	Best Sports Coverage
John Farnham: Finding the Voice (Seven Network); Hot Potato: The Story of The Wiggles (Amazon Prime Video); Matildas: The World at Our Feet (Disney+); Nemesis (ABC); Revealed: Ben Roberts-Smith Truth on Trial (Stan); War on Waste (ABC)	FIFA Women's World Cup 2023 (Seven Network); 2023 AFL finals series (Seven Network); 2023 NRL Grand Final (Nine Network); 2023 State of Origin (Nine Network); Australian Open (Nine Network); Fox League Las Vegas Week (Foxtel/Kayo Sports)
Best Children's Program
Bluey (ABC); Beep and Mort (ABC); Eddie's Lil' Homies (NITV/Netflix); Gardening Australia Junior (ABC); Ginger and the Vegesaurs (ABC); Play School (ABC)

== Changes ==
The award categories in this ceremony had a major overhaul, with the previous most popular and most outstanding categories being merged into a single new category named "best". Award winners will now be determined using a combined score from a jury, viewing data and public voting. Some special awards categories will remain publicly voted including the Gold Logie Award, Bert Newton Award for Most Popular Presenter and Graham Kennedy Award for Most Popular New Talent.

== Performers ==
- Guy Sebastian and Jessica Mauboy with the John Farnham band
- Missy Higgins
- James Bay
