= Trent Dalton =

Australian journalist and literary fiction author

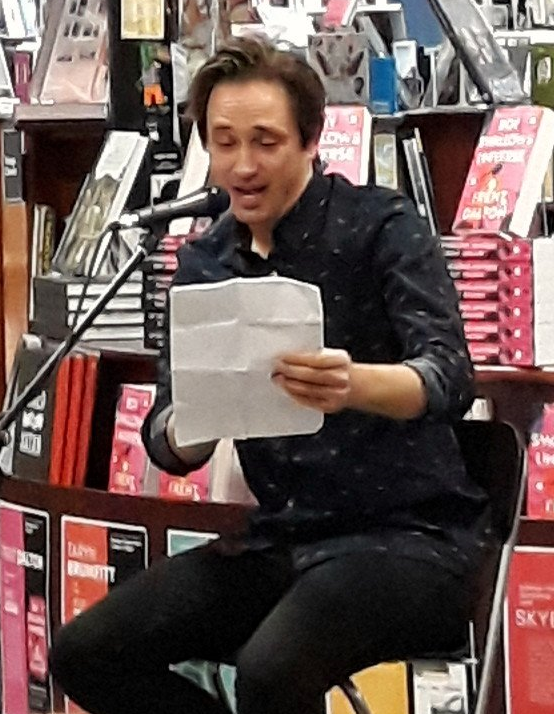
- Dalton in 2018
- Born: 1978 or 1979; Ipswich, Queensland, Australia
- Occupation: Writer
- Spouse: Fiona Franzmann
- Children: 2
- Writing career
- Notable works: Boy Swallows Universe; All Our Shimmering Skies; Love Stories; Lola in the Mirror
- Notable awards: ABIA Awards; Indie Book Awards; MUD Literary Prize; Walkley Awards

Trent Dalton (born 1978 or 1979) is an Australian novelist and journalist. He is best known for his 2018 semi-autobiographical novel Boy Swallows Universe.

== Early life and education ==
Trent Dalton was born in 1978 or 1979 in Ipswich, Queensland, the youngest of four sons. He spent his early childhood living with his mother and stepfather in Brassall. Both sold heroin and spent time in jail. When he was seven years old, his mother was sent to prison for two years for smuggling drugs. Dalton spent the following 12 months living with his paternal grandparents. After that he lived with his father in a Housing Commission house in Bracken Ridge, a suburb on the northern outskirts of Brisbane. For a few years in their teens, Dalton and one of his brothers lived with his mother.

After high school, Dalton studied journalism for one year at University of Southern Queensland then another year at Queensland University of Technology.

== Career ==
After being recommended by a QUT tutor, Dalton was hired in 2000 as a writer for Brisbane News, a free weekly magazine. He then worked as a journalist for The Courier-Mail. As of April 2024, he works as a staff writer for The Weekend Australian Magazine.

In 2011 Dalton published Detours: Stories from the Street, a book containing profiles of 20 people he had interviewed who were living on the street, or at risk of becoming homeless.

In 2018 he published the semi-autobiographical novel Boy Swallows Universe through 4th Estate, which was longlisted for the 2019 Miles Franklin Award. In May 2019 the television adaptation rights for Boy Swallows Universe were secured by Anonymous Content, Chapter One and Hopscotch Features. A seven-episode limited series was commissioned by Netflix and released in January 2024. The Queensland Theatre Company also developed a play from the novel, which premiered in September 2021 at the Brisbane Festival.

In 2020 Dalton published his second novel, All Our Shimmering Skies, which is also centred around words and storytelling. In 2021, Dalton published Love Stories, a collection of love stories gathered from street-corner interviews with passersby.

Dalton's third novel, Lola in the Mirror, was released in October 2023.

Dalton collaborated with singer-songwriter Katie Noonan, using his early diaries as the basis of the lyrics for some of the songs on her June 2026 album Alone But All One. On 8 October 2026, he appeared in an episode of Australian Story about Noonan, entitled Second Start.

== Personal life ==
Dalton has two daughters with his wife Fiona.

== Works ==
=== Fiction ===
- —— (2018). Boy Swallows Universe (hardcover 1st ed.). New York: Harper. ISBN 9780062898104.
- —— (2020). All Our Shimmering Skies (paperback 1st ed.). Sydney: HarperCollins Australia. ISBN 9781460753903.
- —— (2023). Lola in the Mirror (paperback 1st ed.). Sydney: 4th Estate. ISBN 9781460759837.
- —— (2025). Gravity let me go (paperback 1st ed.). Sydney: HarperCollins Publishers Australia. ISBN 9781460759851.

=== Non-fiction ===
- —— (2011). Detours: Stories from the Street (paperback ed.). Fortitude Valley: Celeste Davidson. ISBN 9780646558677.
- —— (2018). By Sea & Stars: The Story of the First Fleet (hardcover 1st ed.). Sydney: 4th Estate. ISBN 9781460757413.^{α}
- —— (2021). Love Stories (hardcover 1st ed.). 4th Estate. ISBN 9781460760932.

=== Notes ===
^{α} Originally published as a multi-part series in The Australian.

== Recognition and a wards ==
In 2024 Dalton became an honorary fellow at University of Southern Queensland.

=== Journalism awards ===
- Walkley Awards
  - 2011: Winner: Social Equity Journalism for "Home is where the hurt is"
  - 2015: Winner: Feature Writing Short (under 4000 words) for "The Ghosts of Murray Street"
  - 2020: Shortlisted: Feature Writing Long (over 4000 words) for "Back From The Black"

=== Literary prizes ===
Year	Book	Award	Category	Result	Ref.
2018	Boy Swallows Universe	Dymocks Book of the Year	—	Won	
2019	Boy Swallows Universe	Australian Book Industry Awards	Australian Book of the Year	Won	
2019	Boy Swallows Universe	Australian Book Industry Awards	Australian Literary Fiction Book of the Year	Won	
2019	Boy Swallows Universe	Australian Book Industry Awards	Matt Richell Award for New Writer	Won	
2019	Boy Swallows Universe	Australian Book Industry Awards	Audiobook of the Year	Won	
2019	Boy Swallows Universe	Australian Booksellers Association Awards	BookPeople Book of the Year	Won	
2019	Boy Swallows Universe	Colin Roderick Award	—	Shortlisted	
2019	Boy Swallows Universe	Indie Book Awards	Book of the Year	Won	
2019	Boy Swallows Universe	Indie Book Awards	Debut Fiction	Won	
2019	Boy Swallows Universe	Miles Franklin Award	—	Longlisted	
2019	Boy Swallows Universe	MUD Literary Prize	—	Won	
2019	Boy Swallows Universe	New South Wales Premier's Literary Awards	UTS Glenda Adams Award for New Writing	Won	
2019	Boy Swallows Universe	New South Wales Premier's Literary Awards	People's Choice Award	Won	
2019	Boy Swallows Universe	Queensland Literary Awards	Queensland Premier's Literary Award		
2019	Boy Swallows Universe	Queensland Literary Awards	The Courier-Mail People's Choice Book of the Year		
2020	Boy Swallows Universe	International Dublin Literary Award	—	Longlisted	

- Australian Book Industry Awards
  - 2021: Shortlisted: Literary Fiction Book of the Year All Our Shimmering Skies
- Indie Book Awards
  - 2021: Shortlisted: Fiction All Our Shimmering Skies
  - 2022: Shortlisted: Nonfiction Love Stories
  - 2024: Shortlisted: Fiction Lola in the Mirror
- Queensland Literary Awards
  - 2019: Shortlisted: Queensland Premier's Literary Award for a work of State Significance, for Boy Swallows Universe
  - 2019: Shortlisted: The Courier-Mail People's Choice Queensland Book of the Year Award, for Boy Swallows Universe
