= Ghosts (Australian TV series) =

Australian sitcom (2025–present)

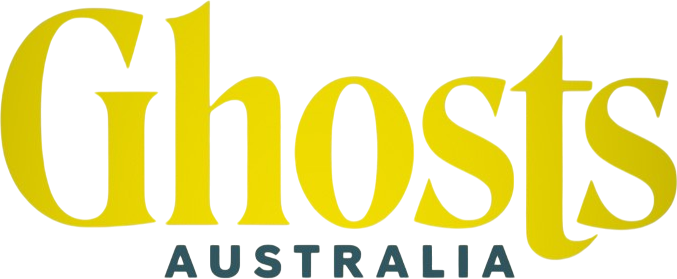
- Also known as: Ghosts Australia
- Genre: Sitcom
- Based on: Ghosts by: Mathew Baynton; Simon Farnaby; Martha Howe-Douglas; Jim Howick; Laurence Rickard; Ben Willbond
- Written by: Libby Butler; Philip Denson; Shontell Ketchell; Steph Tisdell; Josh Mapleston
- Directed by: Christiaan Van Vuuren; Madeleine Dyer
- Starring: Tamala Shelton; Rowan Witt; Mandy McElhinney; Brent Hill; Ines English; Michelle Brasier; George Zhao; Jackson Tozer
- Music by: Jed Palmer
- Country of origin: Australia
- Original language: English
- No. of series: 1
- No. of episodes: 8

Production
- Executive producers: Sophia Zachariou; Josh Mapleston
- Cinematography: Emma Paine
- Camera setup: Multi-camera
- Running time: 30 minutes
- Production companies: BBC Studios Productions Australia; Monumental Television

Original release
- Network: Network 10; Paramount+
- Release: 2 November 2025 – present

Related
- Ghosts (British TV series); Ghosts (American TV series)

Ghosts is an Australian television sitcom adapted for Network 10 and Paramount+ from the original British series of the same name. It premiered on 2 November 2025.

== Premise ==
When city couple Kate and Sean inherit Ramshead Manor, a rundown country estate, they see it as a sign for a fresh new start. But after Kate has a near-death experience, she gains the ability to see and hear ghosts – and discovers there are several living in the mansion. Kate must navigate the ghosts' issues while trying to start a hotel business with Sean, who remains unable to see them.

== Production ==
In October 2024, an Australian adaptation was first announced for Network 10 and Paramount+ during the network's annual upfronts event, with BBC Studios Australia producing the series. Eight episodes were announced to be filmed in Perth, Western Australia and the ghost characters included publican and Irish Great Famine survivor Eileen, naval officer Gideon, early-20th century socialite Miranda, 1980s aerobics instructor Lindy, Chinese-born Australian Gold Rush miner Joon and 90s motorbike gang-member "Satan". The living characters are played by Tamala Shelton and Rowan Witt. The series premiered on both Network 10 and Paramount+ on 2 November 2025.

== Cast ==
=== Breathers ===
- Tamala Shelton as Kate – a woman who discovers she has inherited Ramshead Manor, a massive and historic mansion in the country. After a near death experience, Kate gains the ability to see ghosts. She is based on Alison Cooper from the British series.
- Rowan Witt as Sean – Kate's loveable city boy partner. He is based on Mike Cooper from the British series.

=== Ghosts ===
- Mandy McElhinney as Eileen – an 1800s Irish publican. Her ghost power is an alcoholic breath that makes living people drunk. Her ghost power is similar to Susan "Flower" Montero's in the US series.
- Brent Hill as Gideon – a former naval officer from the Third Fleet who landed with his associate near the area that would become Larkin, but who would be impaled with a tribal spear while attempting to quell an uprising of natives and settlers.
- Ines English as Miranda Persephone Bathsheba Munchen – a betrothed social butterfly who died during the Great Influenza epidemic. Her ghost power is a cold breath that makes the air freezing. She is reminiscent of both Lady Button and Thomas Thorne in the British series.
- Michelle Brasier as Lindy Darwin-Paul – an aerobics instructor from the 1980s. Her ghost power is to manipulate electricity. She has the same ghost power as Robin from the British series or Thorfinn from the American series.
- George Zhao as Joon – a Chinese miner who died during the gold rush era. Hitting his head on a stone has given him an eternal concussion, killing him. Like Julian in the British series and Trevor in the US series Joon isn't wearing any trousers, but lacks a ghost power.
- Jackson Tozer as Brian "Satan" – a bikie from the 1990s who actually is a sweet soul. His ghost power is the ability to touch and move objects with his finger. He has the same ghost power as Julian from the British series and Trevor from the American series.

== Episodes ==
No. in series	Title	Directed by	Written by	Original release date	Network 10 airdate	Aus. viewers
1	"The Haunting of Ramshead Manor"	Christiaan Van Vuuren	Josh Mapleston	2 November 2025	2 November 2025	296,000
2	"I See Dead People"	Christiaan Van Vuuren	Libby Butler	2 November 2025	2 November 2025	263,000
3	"The Legend of Joon's Gold"	Christiaan Van Vuuren	Josh Mapleston	2 November 2025	9 November 2025	492,000
4	"Hot Box"	Christiaan Van Vuuren	Libby Butler and Shontell Ketchell	2 November 2025	16 November 2025	349,000
5	"Date Night"	Madeleine Dyer	Philip Tarl Denson	2 November 2025	23 November 2025	425,000
6	"Meet the Neighbours?"	Madeleine Dyer	Steph Tisdell and Josh Mapleston	2 November 2025	30 November 2025	381,000
7	"Such Is Death"	Madeleine Dyer	Josh Mapleston	2 November 2025	7 December 2025	320,000
8	"Say Yed!"	Madeleine Dyer	Libby Butler	2 November 2025	7 December 2025	171,000

== Broadcast ==
Ghosts Australia was Premiered on 10 November 2025 on Network 10 and Paramount+

In June 2026 it was announced that the BBC had acquired UK distributions rights. The show then premiered in the UK on BBC Three and BBC iPlayer on 25 July 2026.

The show became available in the US on Paramount+ on 25 September 2026.

== Reception ==
=== Critical reception ===
The series has been received as mostly positive, Anthony Morris of ScreenHub rated it 3.5 out of 5 stars calling it "a lightweight, well-crafted dramedy rather than a rapid-fire joke machine." Chelsea Hui of Mamamia called the series "quintessentially Australian" and praised the ensemble cast for their magnetic chemistry.

=== Ratings ===
Ghosts : Australia viewers per episode (thousands)

Season	Episode number							
Season	1	2	3	4	5	6	7	8
1	460	397	478	364	346	336	295	171

Source: Viewership data is from OzTAM and represents the consolidated National average viewership within a week after broadcast.
