= Sonny Walker =

English actor

- Born: 1997 (age 28–29); Merseyside, England
- Occupation: Actor
- Years active: 2021–present

Sonny Walker is an English actor.

== Early life ==
Sonny Walker was born in Merseyside, United Kingdom and grew up in the Liverpool suburb of Kensington.

== Career ==
In 2016 at the age of 19, Walker signed with a modelling agency and worked at London Fashion Week.

In 2021, Walker made his television debut in Doctor Who.

He appeared in BBC One drama series The Responder in 2022, alongside Martin Freeman in the lead role.

Deadline announced that Walker would portray the character of Adam Kabia in Channel 4 thriller The Gathering, alongside Eva Morgan in the lead role, as well as Warren Brown, Richard Coyle, Vinette Robinson, and Sadie Soverall. He was nominated for Best Supporting Actor at the 2025 British Academy Television Awards for his role in the drama.

== Filmography ==
=== Television ===
Year	Title	Role	Notes
2021	Doctor Who	Stevie	1 episode
2022	The Responder	Stevo Marsh	1 episode
2024	The Gathering	Adam Kabia	6 episodes
2026	Legends (2026 TV series)	Paul	4 episodes

== See also ==
- The Vanquishers
