= Lee Tiger Halley =

Australian actor

- Other name: Lee Halley
- Occupation: Actor
- Notable work: Boy Swallows Universe; Crazy Fun Park

Lee Tiger Halley is an Australian actor. He won the 14th AACTA Awards AACTA Award for Best Guest or Supporting Actor in a Television Drama for his performance in Boy Swallows Universe. He was nominated for 2024 Logie Awards for Most Popular New Talent and Best Best Supporting Actor. Other shows he played in includes Crazy Fun Park and The Heights. He appears in the 2025 shark horror Beast of War and has been signed to play Bon Scott in the film The Kid From Harvest Road. In 2020 he was the cover model for the book Honeybee.
