= Two Birds (TV series) =

British and Australian television series

- Screenplay by: Helen FitzGerald; Megan Palinkas
- Directed by: James Griffiths; Corrie Chen
- Starring: Sheridan Smith; Jacki Weaver
- Countries of origin: United Kingdom; Australia
- Original language: English
- No. of series: 1

Production
- Executive producers: James Griffiths; Helen FitzGerland; Patrick Spence; Luke Speed; Andy Ryan; Donna Chang
- Producer: Martha Coleman
- Production companies: AC Chapter One; Third Act Stories Pty Ltd

Original release
- Network: ITVX; Stan

Two Birds is an upcoming British-Australian television series for ITVX and Stan, starring Sheridan Smith and Jacki Weaver.

== Premise ==
A widowed British police woman relocates to Australia for a fresh start.

== Cast ==
- Sheridan Smith
- Jacki Weaver
- Colin Friels
- Stephen Peacocke
- Fiona Button
- Eva Morgan
- Lila McGuire
- Harry Greenwood
- Nic Cassim
- Victoria Fowler
- Kit Jeakings-Bull
- Matthew Pearce
- Sarah Roberts
- Matt Day

== Production ==
The series is written by Helen FitzGerald and Megan Palinkas with episodes directed by James Griffiths and Corrie Chen. Martha Coleman is series producer with executive producers including Griffiths, FitzGerland, Patrick Spence, Luke Speed, Andy Ryan and Donna Chang. Announced in March 2026, it is a production by AC Chapter One and Third Act Stories Pty Ltd for ITVX in the United Kingdom and Stan in Australia.

The cast is led by Sheridan Smith and Jacki Weaver with Colin Friels and Stephen Peacocke and includes Fiona Button, Eva Morgan, Lila McGuire. Filming took place in Perth and Kalgoorlie, Western Australia in 2026. First look images from the set were released to the media in September 2026.

== Broadcast ==
The series will broadcast in the United Kingdom on ITV1 and on ITVX. A first trailer was released in November 2026.
