= Boy Swallows Universe =

2018 novel by Trent Dalton

- First edition cover
- Author: Trent Dalton
- Audio read by: Stig Wemyss
- Cover artist: Darren Holt
- Language: English
- Genre: Bildungsroman, crime thriller, magical realism
- Publisher: Fourth Estate (HarperCollins)
- Publication date: 18 June 2018
- Publication place: Australia
- Media type: Print, ebook, kindle, audiobook
- Pages: 488 pp.
- ISBN: 9781460753897

Boy Swallows Universe is the debut novel by Australian writer Trent Dalton. It was originally published by Fourth Estate in Australia in 2018. The novel won a number of awards and was performed as a play by the Queensland Theatre in 2021. Netflix adapted it into a television series under the same name – Boy Swallows Universe.

== Synopsis ==
This semi-autobiographical coming-of-age novel is set in Brisbane, Queensland, in 1983. Eli Bell is a traumatised teenager with an absent father, a mute brother, an imprisoned mother, and a heroin dealer for a stepfather.

== Characters ==
- Eli Bell – the narrator and main protagonist, a 13 year old boy
- August 'Gus' Bell – Eli's older brother, 15 years old
- Frankie Bell – Eli and Gus' mother, former addict
- Lyle – Frankie's boyfriend, a drug dealer
- Robert Bell - Eli and Gus' Father
- Caitlyn Spies – a journalist and Eli's childhood crush
- Tytus Broz – the "Lord of Limbs," he is a well regarded philanthropist who built and runs a company that creates and manufactures prosthetics
- Iwan Kroll – Tytus's henchman, a real life boogieman
- Arthur "Slim" Halliday - Eli's best friend, reformed criminal

== Publication history ==
After its original publication in 2018 in Australia by publisher Fourth Estate the novel was later republished as follows:

- HarperCollins, US, 2019
- Fourth Estate, Australia, 2019, 2023
- The Borough Press, UK, 2019, 2020

The novel was also translated into Spanish, Swedish, French, Dutch, Finnish, Turkish, Portuguese, Chinese, Czech, and Lithuanian in 2019; Italian, Polish, and Russian in 2020; and German, Korean, Japanese and Hebrew in 2021. It became the fastest-selling debut novel in Australian history, selling more than a million copies worldwide.

== Critical reception ==
John Collee in The Age compared the writer to Tim Winton and Robert Drewe, stating – "Dalton is a writer in the same league. His dialogue is every bit as funny and accurate as Winton's, his prose just as evocative, and he's better at wrapping up the ending. The last 100 pages of Boy Swallows Universe propel you like an express train to a conclusion that is profound and complex and unashamedly commercial. There are shades of Raymond Chandler in the final confrontation with the town's bleached and wealthy benefactor whose cement bunker conceals a chilling secret. And even a nod to John Buchan."

Sunil Dasgupta writing in the Washington Independent Review of Books noted – "This is Dalton's debut novel, and he is a compelling storyteller with an exceptional voice. He depicts a heroin-addled Australia that we are not familiar with in the United States, a perch from where Australia looks like all gorgeous beaches and even more gorgeous beach bums."

It was widely discussed by other reviewers below, many of whom also found it compelling.

- Michael Cart in Booklist: "Teens who enjoy literary fiction will be enchanted by this remarkably readable and memorable novel."
- Ellen Morton in The Washington Post: "Boy Swallows Universe hypnotizes you with wonder, and then hammers you with heartbreak."
- Amelia Lester in The New York Times: "One can't help quibbling that the story seems designed with an eye to its own presumed dramatic adaptation. (Dalton's résumé includes a few screenplays.) The violence is occasionally too much. Toward the end, a plot point involving severed limbs is downright fanciful. Such florid unpleasantries feel all the more gratuitous because the most compelling aspects of Boy Swallows Universe come from real life."

In 2025 it was voted No. 1 in a poll of the best 100 books of the 21st century, run by ABC Radio National in Australia. In 2026, it was voted No. 3 in a poll of the best 100 Australia books, also run by ABC Radio National.

== Awards ==
Year	Award	Category	Result	Ref.
2018	Dymocks Book of the Year	—	Won	
2019	Australian Book Industry Awards	Australian Book of the Year	Won	
2019	Australian Book Industry Awards	Australian Literary Fiction Book of the Year	Won	
2019	Australian Book Industry Awards	Matt Richell Award for New Writer	Won	
2019	Australian Booksellers Association Awards	BookPeople Book of the Year	Won	
2019	Colin Roderick Award	—	Shortlisted	
2019	Indie Book Awards	Book of the Year	Won	
2019	Indie Book Awards	Debut Fiction	Won	
2019	Miles Franklin Award	—	Longlisted	
2019	MUD Literary Prize	—	Won	
2019	New South Wales Premier's Literary Awards	UTS Glenda Adams Award for New Writing	Won	
2019	New South Wales Premier's Literary Awards	People's Choice Award	Won	
2020	International Dublin Literary Award	—	Longlisted	
2025	ABC Radio National Top 100	Top 100 Books of the 21st Century	Won	

== Adaptations ==
A 2021 stage adaptation became the best-selling show in Queensland Theatre's history.

The book was adapted for a 7-episode TV mini-series produced by Brouhaha Entertainment's Andrew Mason and Troy Lum, which premiered on Netflix on 11 January 2024. The adaptation was written by John Collee, with episodes directed by Bharat Nalluri, Jocelyn Moorhouse, and Kim Mordaunt. It featured Lee Tiger Halley and Felix Cameron in the lead roles.

== See also ==
- 2018 in Australian literature
