= David & Fatima =

2008 film by Alain Zaloum

- Theatrical release poster
- Directed by: Alain Zaloum
- Written by: Kari Bian; Alain Zaloum; Patrick Krauss; Randala
- Produced by: Tammi Sutton
- Starring: Cameron Van Hoy; Danielle Pollack; Martin Landau; Tony Curtis
- Cinematography: Neil Lisk
- Edited by: Richard Francis-Bruce; Kimberly Generous White
- Music by: Michael J. Lloyd
- Release date: June 27, 2008
- Country: United States
- Language: English

David & Fatima is a 2008 drama film about a Palestinian woman and Israeli man from Jerusalem who fall in love. The film is a retelling of William Shakespeare's Romeo & Juliet, and was directed by Alain Zaloum, and stars Cameron Van Hoy, Danielle Pollack, Merik Tadros, Anthony Batarse, Ismail Kanater, Sasha Knopf, John Bryant Davila, Ben Kermode, Allan Kolman, Tony Curtis and Martin Landau. This was Tony Curtis's last film.

The film encourages Arab—Israeli peace.

== Development ==
Kari Bian the executive producer and one of the writers, is an Iranian American living in Malibu, California. He recalled that he encountered hostility during a visit to Israel. Tavia Dautartas, the other producer, is also a Malibu resident. Alain Zaloum, the director, and the other writer, is a Cairo-born Copt who during childhood moved to Canada. He had graduated from the film school of the University of Southern California (USC). Bian selected Zaloum because Zaloum was neither Jewish nor was he Muslim, since Bian did not want to give favoritism to either side of the Israeli-Palestinian conflict. Zaloum was the seventh director that had been hired; the producers fired the previous six choices for director. Richard Francis-Bruce did editing work.

== Production ==
The film was almost completely shot in Los Angeles, and shooting took place for five weeks. Tim Worman, the art director, developed areas to appear like the film's settings. Some exterior shots were actually made in Israel. Dialect coaches trained the actors. In addition the actors read history texts about the conflict region. The film's budget was $600,000 ($897217.93 adjusted for inflation).

== Cast ==
Americans portrayed almost all of the major characters.

- Cameron Van Hoy as David Isaac
  - Van Hoy, who is not Jewish, directly applied for the acting role instead of using an agent.
- Danielle Pollack as Fatima Aziz
  - Pollack, a Jewish woman who originates from New York, is not an Arab. Seth Frantzman of The Jerusalem Post wrote that few Arab women portrayed fictional Arab females in similar films. Her role as Fatima was her first professional film job. Despite her inexperience, Van Hoy gave the filmmakers the suggestion of using Pollack; As part of her research she put on a hijab and went shopping at a supermarket to absorb how others around her reacted.
- Martin Landau as Rabbi Schmulic
- Allan Kolman as Benny Isaac
- Anthony Batarse as Ishmael Aziz
- Yareli Arizmendi as Aiida Aziz
- Colette Kilroy as Sarah Isaac, David's mother
  - Kilroy originates from Malibu
- Tony Curtis as Mr. Schwartz
- Merik Tadros as Hassan Faraj
- Sascha Knopf as Tami Isaac
- Ben Kermode as Avi Weinstein
- Michael Yavnielli as IDF Recruitment Officer
- Joey Naber as Christian Priest
- Ismail Kanater as Imam
- John Bryant Davila as IDF Soldier
- Alim Kouliev as Moroccan Restaurant Patron, as Ishmael Aziz (Voice Over the Russian Language)

== Accuracy ==
Frantzman wrote that the film's depiction of the Israeli Defense Force (IDF) was "accurate", "gritty", and "sometimes unflattering". He added that Beit Hanina an Arab doctor's house in real life would be more luxurious than the one the film portrays; in addition Frantzman stated that in Jerusalem he had never encountered a bellydancing restaurant like one portrayed in the film and he did not believe such a restaurant existed.

== Release ==
A screening at the Laemmle 4-Plex Theater in Santa Monica, California was scheduled to run until July 25, 2008. The filmmakers intended to distribute the film throughout the United States and in Israel. There are subtitles available in Arabic, Hebrew, and Persian.

== Reception ==
During the Napa Sonoma Wine Country Film Festival the film received the Robert and Margrit Mondavi Award for Peace and Cultural Understanding.

Frantzman wrote that because ordinary Israelis prefer American films and the upper class prefers "self-critical" films, David & Fatima "received almost no attention in Israel".

Gary Goldstein of the Los Angeles Times criticized the "somewhat ersatz quality" that he says originates from the casting of Americans who made "a jumble of imprecise accents that makes one long for native speech and English subtitles."

Frantzman himself concluded "David and Fatima presents an honest story, but one that also doesn't work in the end."
