= Eva Morgan =

English actress

- Education: Royal Central School of Speech and Drama (BA)
- Occupation: Actress
- Years active: 2024-present
- Television: The Gathering

Eva Morgan is an English stage and television actress from Liverpool. Her television roles include a leading role in The Gathering (2024).

== Career ==
From Liverpool, Morgan took part in amateur dramatics in her youth, but did not consider a career as an actress until her mid-teens. She attended the Royal Central School of Speech and Drama in London, graduating with a Bachelor of Arts degree in Acting in 2023.

Morgan made her on-screen debut in the lead role of Kelly in Channel 4 crime drama series The Gathering (2024). She was cast in the series whilst still in drama school. For the role, she spent time training in gymnastics and parkour at the Airborne Academy in Liverpool. For her performance in the series Morgan won the North West Royal Television Society Award for Best Performance in a Drama 2024, ahead of fellow nominees in her category; Steve Coogan, Jodie Whittaker and Jason Isaacs. She could also be seen in BBC One Liverpool-set crime drama series This City is Ours (2025).

In 2025, she was nominated at The Stage Debut Awards for Best Performer in a Play for her role as Laura in The Glass Menagerie by Tennessee Williams at The Yard Theatre, London. In 2026, she joined the cast of Australian and British drama series Two Birds for Stan and ITV1.

== Filmography ==
Year	Title	Role	Notes
2024	The Gathering	Kelly	Lead role
2025	This City is Ours	Molly	
