= Dustfall =

2026 Australian drama series

- Genre: Crime drama
- Created by: Dianne Taylor
- Based on: The Unbelieved by Vikki Petraitis
- Written by: Stuart Page; Belinda Chayko; Beatrix Christian; Dianne Taylor
- Directed by: Emma Freeman
- Starring: Anna Torv; Juliet Stevenson; Lila McGuire; Peter Fenton; Bert La Bonté; Ling Cooper Tang; Kate Box; Martin Sacks; Conrad Coleby; Jay Ryan
- Country of origin: Australia
- Original language: English
- No. of seasons: 1
- No. of episodes: 6

Production
- Executive producers: Anna Torv; Emma Freeman; Deborah Balderstone; Xavier Marchand; Daisy Gilbert; Dianne Taylor
- Producers: Deborah Balderstone; Xavier Marchand; Daisy Gilbert
- Editors: Julie-Anne De Ruvo; Angie Higgins
- Running time: 55 minutes
- Production companies: Soapbox Pictures; Moonriver

Original release
- Network: ABC TV

Dustfall is an Australian six-episode drama miniseries for the Australian Broadcasting Corporation, released on 11 October 2026 on ABC Television. Starring Anna Torv and Juliet Stevenson, the series is based on the 2022 crime thriller novel The Unbelieved by Vikki Petraitis.

== Plot ==
Detective Tig Pollard returns to her hometown of North Gap, after spending years in the city, to investigate a sexual assault case where an 18-year-old is found naked in a cane field with no memory of how she got there. A ring of drink spiking and assaults is uncovered and a main suspect turns up dead, prompting Pollard to dive deeper into the case and the stories of the lives of those affected. In a quest to uncover the truth, a face from Pollard's past resurfaces, forcing her to confront secrets from times gone by.

== Cast ==
The cast was announced on 20 November 2025 the same day as the series was announced at the ABC Upfronts.

- Anna Torv as Tig Pollard
- Juliet Stevenson as Olivia Pollard
- Lila McGuire as Talia Walker
- Peter Fenton as Andy D'Silva
- Bert La Bonté as Remi Jolicoeur
- Ling Cooper Tang as Bernadette Quinn
- Kate Box as Fiona Kelly
- Martin Sacks as Tony Morrison
- Conrad Coleby as Ross Kelly
- Jay Ryan as Simon Prendergast
- Harry Gilchrist as Blake Campbell
- Gemma Chua-Tran as Maya Luu
- Alice Ansara as Shayna Griffin
- Zoe Phillips as Edie Kelly
- Theo Haitana as Finn Morrison
- Ben Knight as Mitch
- Kirsty O'Connor as Ronnie
- Ed Wightman as Greg Filmore
- Luke J Morgan as Lachie Barrett

== Episodes ==
No.	Title	Directed by	Written by	Original release date
1	"Episode 1"	Emma Freeman	Belinda Chayko, Beatrix Christian, Stuart Page	October 11, 2026
2	"Episode 2"	Emma Freeman	Belinda Chayko, Beatrix Christian, Stuart Page	October 11, 2026
3	"Episode 3"	Emma Freeman	Belinda Chayko, Beatrix Christian, Stuart Page	October 11, 2026
4	"Episode 4"	Emma Freeman	Belinda Chayko, Beatrix Christian, Stuart Page	October 11, 2026
5	"Episode 5"	Emma Freeman	Belinda Chayko, Beatrix Christian, Stuart Page	October 11, 2026
6	"Episode 6"	Emma Freeman	Belinda Chayko, Beatrix Christian, Stuart Page	October 11, 2026

=== Ratings ===
Episode	Airdate	Viewers	Ref
Episode 1	11 October 2026	120,000	
Episode 2	18 October 2026	414,000	
Episode 3	25 October 2026		

== Production ==
Dustfall is a six-part miniseries based on the 2022 crime thriller novel The Unbelieved by Vikki Petraitis.

The series was commissioned by the ABC and the BBC, and funded by Screen Queensland with additional support from Screen Australia. On 20 November 2025, the series was first announced as part of their 2026 drama slate at ABC Television's Upfronts event, and the BBC announced that they had acquired the rights to air the show in the UK.

Filming took place in the Gold Coast hinterland, mainly around Mount Tamborine, and Brisbane, Queensland. Production took place on the Gold Coast.

Dustfall was produced by Soapbox Pictures and Moonstone, with director Emma Freeman and producer Deborah Balderstone at the helm.

== Release ==
Dustfall aired on ABC TV from 11 October 2026, with all episodes available on ABC iview on the same date.

== Reception ==
Luke Buckmaster of The Guardian rated the series 4 out of 5 stars, saying "Dustfall has an emotional pull not commonly found in detective dramas" and calling it "a rock-solid, socially conscientious drama, imbued with weight and thought."

Anthony Morris from Screen Hub gave it 4½ out of 5 stars saying "Dustfall doesn't always make for comfortable viewing, but a series this determined to have something to say – and which says it so articulately and skilfully – is a rare pleasure."

Craig Mathieson from Sydney Morning Herald gave the series a perfect 5 star review said “The praise for this show, which should be ranked among the finest the ABC has produced, comes not just with superlatives, but an acknowledgment of the responsibility displayed: to not turn away, to not offer easy reassurance. You’ll be enthralled, you’ll be gutted.”

Terry Pontikos from Australian Financial Review gave it 4½ out of 5 and called it "must-see TV". Pontikos praises Torv's performance, saying it's delivered with "mastery and nuance".
