= Watch Dogs (film) =

- Directed by: Mathieu Turi
- Written by: Christie LeBlanc; Victoria Bata
- Based on: Watch Dogs by Ubisoft
- Produced by: Yariv Milchan; Natalie Lehmann; Margaret Boykin
- Starring: Sophie Wilde; Tom Blyth; Markella Kavenagh
- Cinematography: Daniele Massaccesi
- Edited by: Mark Towns
- Production companies: Regency Enterprises; Ubisoft Film & Television
- Country: United States
- Language: English

Watch Dogs is an upcoming American action adventure film directed by Mathieu Turi and written by Christie LeBlanc and Victoria Bata. It is based on the video game series published by Ubisoft. The film will feature an original story set within the series' fictional universe. It stars Sophie Wilde, Tom Blyth, and Markella Kavenagh.

== Cast ==
- Sophie Wilde
- Tom Blyth
- Markella Kavenagh

== Production ==
In June 2013, it was announced that Ubisoft was live-action adaptations of its flagship franchises Watch Dogs, Far Cry, and Rabbids. In April 2014, Rhett Reese and Paul Wernick were hired to write the screenplay for the film, with Regency Enterprises as the production company and Sony Pictures Releasing distributing the film.

By March 2024, Reese and Wernick had exited the project, and Sony Pictures was no longer involved. Ubisoft Film & Television subsequently hired Mathieu Turi to direct the film, with Christie LeBlanc set to write the screenplay. Sophie Wilde was cast in the lead role. In June 2024, Tom Blyth joined the cast in an undisclosed role. It was also announced that the film would feature an original story set in the series' fictional universe.

Principal photography began on July 3, 2024, with Daniele Massaccessi serving as cinematographer. Filming wrapped on September 13, 2024. That same month, Markella Kavenagh joined the cast in an undisclosed role. Reshoots took place in mid-2025. By October 2026, the film was nearing the end of post-production.
