= Dylan Thomas-Smith =

British actor

- Born: Dylan Thomas-Smith; 6 November 2004 (age 21)
- Occupation: Actor
- Years active: 2024–present
- Television: G'wed

Dylan Thomas-Smith (born 6 November 2004) is an English actor from Merseyside, best known for his performance in G'wed. In 2025, he was nominated for the British Academy Television Award for Best Male Comedy Performance.

== Career ==
He is from Prenton in Birkenhead, on Merseyside. In 2024, he appeared in Channel 4 mystery crime drama series The Gathering.

Since 2024, he has portrayed the character Reece on Liverpool-set television sitcom G'wed, broadcast on ITV2. His character has been described as the show's "antihero" and a "potty mouthed scally". The series became the most watched comedy on ITVX since Changing Ends, with 4.9 million streams on the platform. In August 2024, he won Best Breakthrough Performance at the Edinburgh TV Awards. In March 2025, he was nominated for the British Academy Television Award for Best Male Comedy Performance.

== Filmography ==
Year	Title	Role	Notes
2024	The Gathering	Oscar	3 episodes
2024–present	G'wed	Reece	Lead role
