= War on Waste =

Australian documentary TV series

- Genre: Documentary
- Presented by: Craig Reucassel
- Country of origin: Australia
- Original language: English
- No. of seasons: 3
- No. of episodes: 10

Production
- Executive producer: Jodi Boylan
- Running time: 50–60 minutes

Original release
- Network: ABC TV
- Release: 16 May 2017 – 8 August 2023

Related
- Hugh's War on Waste

War on Waste (also known as War on Waste with Craig Reucassel) is an Australian documentary television series, the first season of which premiered on 16 May 2017 on ABC TV.

== Release ==
Season 1 aired on 16 May 2017 and the second series premiered on 24 July 2018. Season 3 premiered on 25 July 2023.

== Summary ==
Filmed in multiple locations across the country, War on Waste focuses on the impact and solutions to material waste in Australia. The series was inspired by the earlier BBC series, Hugh's War on Waste.

== Critical reception ==
In July 2019, TV Week listed War on Waste at No. 95 in its list of the 101 greatest Australian television shows of all time, which appeared in its monthly TV Week Up Close magazine. The magazine recognised the show for creating public awareness and prompting legislative changes, and for encouraging the nation to be mindful of waste.

== Episodes ==
Series	Episodes	Originally released	
Series	Episodes	First released	Last released
1	3	16 May 2017	30 May 2017
Special		3 December 2017	
2	3	24 July 2018	7 August 2018
3	3	25 July 2023	8 August 2023

=== Season 1 (2017) ===
No. overall	No. in season	Topic(s)	Original release date	Viewers
1	1	Food waste	16 May 2017	919,000
2	2	Plastic waste	23 May 2017	894,000
3	3	Coffee cups and fast fashion	30 May 2017	898,000

=== Special ===
No. overall	No. in season	Topic(s)	Original release date	Viewers
4	1	Waste solutions	3 December 2017	628,000

=== Season 2 (2018) ===
No. overall	No. in season	Topic(s)	Original release date	Viewers
5	1	Plastic straws and bottled water	24 July 2018	798,000
6	2	Fast furniture, plastic straws, electrical waste & China's ban on waste imports	31 July 2018	628,000
7	3	Food waste & follow-ups on initiatives from previous episodes	7 August 2018	764,000

=== Season 3 (2023) ===
No. overall	No. in season	Topic(s)	Original release date	Viewers
8	1	Waste solutions	25 July 2023	415,000
9	2	Food waste	1 August 2023	365,000
10	3	Fast fashion	8 August 2023	325,000

== Awards ==
Award	Year	Category	Nominee	Result
Banksia Sustainability Awards	2017	Gold Banksia Sustainability Award	War on Waste	Won
Banksia Sustainability Awards	2017	Banksia Communication for Change Award	War on Waste	Won
AACTA Awards	2017	Best Documentary Television Program	War on Waste	Won
AACTA Awards	2024	Best Documentary or Factual Program	War on Waste	Nominated
Logie Awards	2018	Most Outstanding Factual or Documentary Program	War on Waste	Won
Logie Awards	2024	Best Factual or Documentary Program	War on Waste	Nominated

== See also ==
- Litter in Australia
- Recycling in Australia
