= Sophie Wilde =

Australian actress (born 1997)

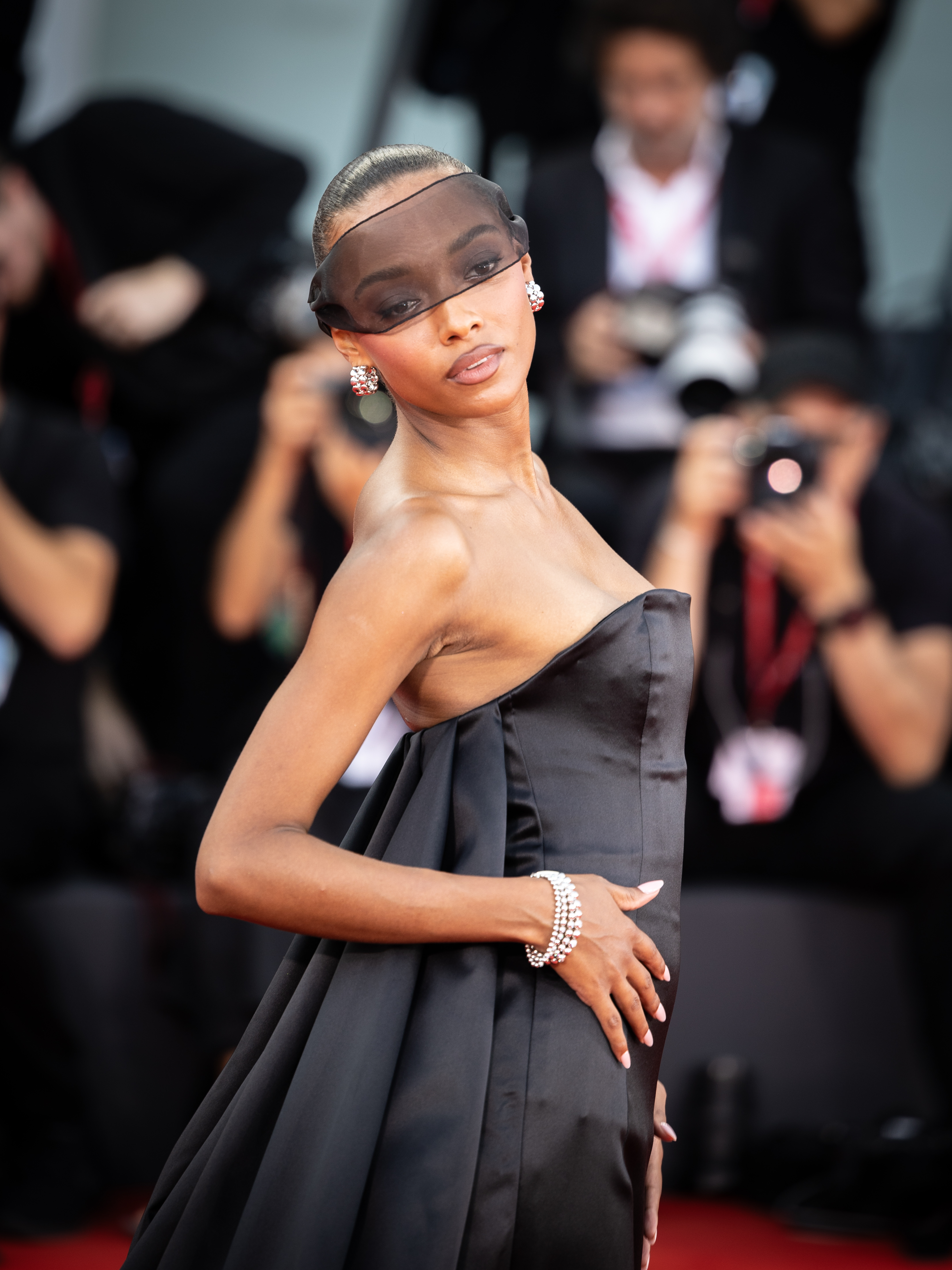
- Wilde at the 2024 Venice Film Festival
- Born: 1997 (age 28–29); Sydney, New South Wales, Australia
- Education: National Institute of Dramatic Art (BFA)
- Occupation: Actress
- Years active: 2020–present

Sophie Wilde (born 1997) is an Australian actress. She gained early attention for her roles on the Stan drama series Eden and the BBC One drama miniseries You Don't Know Me (both 2021). Her performance in the horror film Talk to Me (2022) brought her further recognition, winning the AACTA Award for Best Actress in a Leading Role. She also received a nomination for the BAFTA Rising Star Award and was honoured with the Trophée Chopard.

Her other film roles include The Portable Door (2023) and Babygirl (2024). On television, she starred in the ITV period drama Tom Jones, and the Netflix series Everything Now (both 2023) and Boy Swallows Universe (2024). For the latter, Wilde received a Logie Award.

== Early life and education ==
Wilde was born in 1997 to an Ivorian mother and an Australian father. She has a younger brother and grew up in Enmore, an Inner West suburb of Sydney.

As a child, Wilde's grandparents would take her to "theatre shows, the opera and random musicals". From the age of five, she took drama classes at the National Institute of Dramatic Art (NIDA) and the Australian Theatre for Young People (ATYP).

She attended Newtown High School of the Performing Arts. After finishing school, she studied acting at NIDA, graduating in 2019 with a Bachelor of Fine Arts in Acting.

In 2014, during a trip to the Himalayas, Wilde, then 17 years old, and her father were reported missing following the 2014 Nepal snowstorm disaster. After nine days, Wilde's father contacted her mother to tell her they were fine, having travelled to a remote area of the Himalayas when the avalanche hit.

== Career ==
In 2020, Wilde played Ophelia in the Bell Shakespeare production of Hamlet. That same year, she was named a Rising Star by the Casting Guild of Australia.

In 2021, Wilde made her television debut as Scout in the Stan drama series Eden. Wilde said that it was the "first audition where she had gut-certainty that it was the right role". Later that year, she starred as Kyra opposite Samuel Adewunmi in the BBC four-part series You Don't Know Me. To prepare for the role, Wilde practised her English accent by watching and listening to British actresses such as Michaela Coel.

Wilde made her feature film debut in the supernatural horror film Talk to Me, which screened at the 2022 Adelaide Film Festival and the 2023 Sundance Film Festival. She earned critical praise for her performance. Jeannette Catsoulis of The New York Times wrote that the film "owes much of its potency to Sophie Wilde's continually evolving lead performance". Justin Chang of the Los Angeles Times said that "...even when Talk to Me flirts with incoherence, Wilde pulls it back from the brink. More than just a great scream queen, she makes vivid sense of Mia's ravaged emotions, revealing her to be a captive less to the spirit realm than to her own inconsolable grief." David Rooney of The Hollywood Reporter said that "...talented newcomer Wilde does the heaviest dramatic lifting." For her performance, she won the AACTA Award for Best Actress in a Leading Role and was nominated for the Saturn Award for Best Supporting Actress, among other accolades.

In August 2022, Wilde was cast in the lead role of Mia Polanco in the Netflix series Everything Now, which was released in 2023. In 2023, Wilde starred as Sophie Western in the ITV period drama Tom Jones alongside Solly McLeod and Hannah Waddingham, and in the fantasy film The Portable Door with Christoph Waltz.

In 2024, Wilde was nominated for the BAFTA Rising Star Award. Also in 2024, she played reporter Caitlyn Spies in the Australian Netflix series Boy Swallows Universe. That same year, she starred in the erotic thriller film Babygirl.

Wilde will star in a live-action film adaptation of the video game Watch Dogs alongside Tom Blyth directed by Mathieu Turi. In November 2025, it was reported that Wilde was cast in an untitled A24 horror film to be directed by Arkasha Stevenson.

In August 2024, it was announced she had been cast in Digger alongside Tom Cruise, playing Hannah, the director of the in-universe play, Fossil Fools.

== Filmography ==
=== Film ===
Year	Title	Role	Notes
2018	Bird		Short film
2022	Talk to Me	Mia	
2023	The Portable Door	Sophie Pettingel	
2024	Babygirl	Esmée Smith	
2026	Digger	Hannah	
2027	Slayground †	TBA	Post-production
TBA	Watch Dogs †	TBA	Post-production
TBA	Untitled Arkasha Stevenson film †	TBA	Post-production

=== Television ===
Year	Title	Role	Notes
2021	Eden	Scout	Main role
2021	You Don't Know Me	Kyra	Miniseries; 4 episodes
2023	Tom Jones	Sophia Western	Miniseries; 4 episodes
2023	Everything Now	Mia Polanco	Main role
2024	Boy Swallows Universe	Caitlyn Spies	Main role

=== Stage ===
Year	Title	Role	Notes	Ref.
2020	Hamlet	Ophelia	Bell Shakespeare	

=== Music video ===
- "River of Neglect" (2019), Charbel

== Accolades ==
Year	Award	Category	Work	Result	Ref.
2020	Casting Guild of Australia	Rising Star	Herself	Won	
2024	AACTA Awards	Best Actress in a Leading Role	Talk to Me	Won	
2024	Black Reel Awards	Outstanding Lead Performance	Talk to Me	Nominated	
2024	British Academy Film Awards	Rising Star	Herself	Nominated	
2024	Cannes Film Festival	Trophée Chopard	—	Honored	
2024	Saturn Awards	Best Supporting Actress	Talk to Me	Nominated	
2024	Critics' Choice Super Awards	Best Actress in a Horror Movie	Talk to Me	Won	
2024	Logie Awards	Best Supporting Actress	Boy Swallows Universe	Won	

== See also ==
- List of Australian film actors
