= G'wed =

British comedy sitcom television series

- Genre: Sitcom
- Created by: Danny Kenny
- Directed by: Akaash Meeda (Series 1); Chloe English (Series 2–3); Owain Pennington (Series 3)
- Country of origin: United Kingdom
- Original language: English
- No. of series: 3
- No. of episodes: 18

Production
- Running time: 20 minutes
- Production company: Golden Path Productions

Original release
- Network: ITVX; ITV2
- Release: 3 February 2024 – 8 June 2026

G'wed is a British television sitcom broadcast on ITV2 and its streaming service ITVX since 3 February 2024. The series features working-class Liverpudlian teenagers, tackling issues including grief, sex, diversity and class differences.

G'wed was produced by Golden Path Productions and written by Liverpool native Danny Kenny. Hailed as a Scouse comedy, the title refers to Scouse dialect for "go ahead" / "yeah".

The second series was broadcast from 6 February 2025. The third series was broadcast from 8 June 2026.

As of November 2026, G’wed has yet to be commissioned by ITV for any future series.

== Plot ==
The series follows teenagers from Liverpool as they go about their lives. Reece, who is often a misbehaving teenager, but always surprises his loved ones and friends, from quoting Mother Teresa, John Steinbeck to his incredibly mature take on grief. Reece ends up on his last warning at school, meets another student, Christopher, who joins the school and Reece offers to "take care" of the new boy. The two students could not be any different but somehow become friends.

== Cast ==
=== Main characters ===
- Dylan Thomas-Smith as Reece Duffy
- Amber Harrison as Aimee Morris
- Jake Kenny-Byrne as Christopher
- Gemma Barraclough as Mia-Louise Turner
- Zak Douglas as Mo-Fassi
- Max Ainsworth as Connor Bell
- Dominic Murphy as Ted Price

=== Recurring & Supporting characters ===
- Evie Ward-Drummond as Ella Grace AKA The Brimble
- Louis Emerick as Mr Meacher
- Leanne Best as Jodie
- Philip S. McGuinness as Mr Dunn
- Jemma Churchill as Grandma Pat
- John McGrellis as Wayne
- Malek Alkoni as Ziad (series 1)
- Paddy Rowan as Lewis Connolly (series 1–2, guest; series 3)
- Matthew Devlin as Kieron (series 1–2, guest; series 3)
- Nadia Kamalli as Lauren (series 2)
- Simon Lennon as James (series 2)
- Craige Els as Alan & Martin (series 2, guest; series 1)
- Frances McNamee as Tracy (series 3)
- Ben Batt as Disneyland Darren (series 3, guest; series 1)

=== Notable guest stars ===
- Sunetra Sarker as Amal (series 1, 3)
- The Vivienne as themselves (series 2)
- Jennifer Ellison as Anna (series 3)

== Filming and release ==
Filming took place across Merseyside in the summer of 2023. The series aired on ITV2 and began streaming on ITVX in February 2024. The series became the most watched comedy on ITVX since Changing Ends, with 4.9 million streams on the platform. On 2 March 2024, it aired on ITV1. On 11 July 2024, the series was renewed for series two and three.

== Episode list ==
=== Series 1 (2024) ===
No. overall	No. in series	Title	Directed by	Written by	Original release date
1	1	"Posh Muppet"	Akaash Meeda	Danny Kenny	3 February 2024
2	2	"Cutthroat Mo"	Akaash Meeda	Danny Kenny	3 February 2024
3	3	"Mardy Arse"	Akaash Meeda	Danny Kenny	3 February 2024
4	4	"My Leonard Friend"	Akaash Meeda	Danny Kenny	3 February 2024
5	5	"The Juliet OG"	Akaash Meeda	Danny Kenny	3 February 2024
6	6	"He's One of Our Own"	Akaash Meeda	Danny Kenny	3 February 2024

=== Series 2 (2025) ===
No. overall	No. in series	Title	Directed by	Written by	Original release date
7	1	"Oh Mighty Gay One"	Chloe English	Danny Kenny	6 February 2025
8	2	"Mischief Night"	Chloe English	Danny Kenny	6 February 2025
9	3	"Scousechella"	Chloe English	Danny Kenny	6 February 2025
10	4	"Creepy Old Perv"	Chloe English	Chloe English	6 February 2025
11	5	"The Legacy of Reece Duffy"	Chloe English	Paul Carey	6 February 2025

=== Series 3 (2026) ===
No. overall	No. in series	Title	Directed by	Written by	Original release date
12	1	"The Ballad of Three Dads"	Owain Pennington	Danny Kenny	8 June 2026
13	2	"Be Secure, Be Safe, Be Semi"	Owain Pennington	Danny Kenny	8 June 2026
14	3	"One Second to Kill Her"	Owain Pennington	Danny Kenny	8 June 2026
15	4	"Christopher's Choice"	Owain Pennington	Chloe English	8 June 2026
16	5	"The Last Dance"	Owain Pennington	Paul Carey	8 June 2026
17	6	"Almost Famous"	Chloe English	Paul Carey	8 June 2026
18	7	"GCSEs Don't Matter When You're Dead"	Chloe English	Paul Carey	8 June 2026

== Reception ==
The series was nominated at the Broadcast Awards in the Best Comedy Programme category in February 2025.
