= Boy Swallows Universe (TV series) =

2024 Australian television series

- Promotional poster
- Genre: Coming-of-age; Comedy-drama; Crime
- Based on: Boy Swallows Universe by Trent Dalton
- Written by: John Collee
- Directed by: Bharat Nalluri (eps. 1 & 2); Jocelyn Moorhouse (eps. 3-5); Kim Mordaunt (eps. 6 & 7)
- Starring: Travis Fimmel; Phoebe Tonkin; Sophie Wilde; Bryan Brown; Simon Baker; Deborah Mailman; Christopher James Baker; Toby Schmitz; Adam Briggs; Ben O'Toole; Anthony LaPaglia; Felix Cameron; Lee Tiger Halley; Zac Burgess
- Composers: Johnny Klimek; Gabriel Mounsey
- Country of origin: Australia
- Original language: English
- No. of episodes: 7

Production
- Executive producers: Andrew Mason; Troy Lum; Sophie Gardiner; Toby Bentley; Kerry Kohansky Roberts; Joel Edgerton; Bharat Nalluri; John Collee; Trent Dalton
- Production location: Brisbane
- Cinematography: Shelley Farthing-Dawe (eps. 1-5); Mark Wareham (eps. 6 & 7)
- Editors: Jamie Pearson (eps. 1 & 2); Mark Perry (eps. 3-5); Marcus D'Arcy (eps. 6 & 7)
- Running time: 49–77 minutes
- Production companies: Brouhaha Entertainment; Anonymous Content; Chapter One Pictures

Original release
- Network: Netflix
- Release: 11 January 2024

Boy Swallows Universe is an Australian coming of age television miniseries for Netflix based on the semi-autobiographical novel of the same name by Trent Dalton. Produced by Andrew Mason and Troy Lum and written by John Collee, the story revolves around Eli Bell, a working-class youth who enters Brisbane's underworld to save his mother from danger. It features an ensemble cast led by Travis Fimmel, Phoebe Tonkin, Felix Cameron, Lee Tiger Halley, Zac Burgess, Simon Baker, Bryan Brown, Anthony LaPaglia and Sophie Wilde.

The series premiered on Netflix on 11 January 2024 to overwhelming praise from critics and audiences. The story, tone, acting, and faithfulness to the source material were all subjects of particular acclaim. It received numerous accolades, including a record 10 Logie Award nominations.

== Cast ==
- Felix Cameron as Eli Bell (age 13)
  - Zac Burgess as Eli Bell (age 17)
  - Auden Ryan as Eli Bell (age 6)
- Lee Tiger Halley as August 'Gus' Bell, Eli's brother
  - Jake Cockburn as August 'Gus' Bell (age 7)
- Travis Fimmel as Lyle Orlik, Gus and Eli's stepfather
- Simon Baker as Robert Bell, Gus and Eli's father
- Phoebe Tonkin as Frances "Frankie" Bell, Gus and Eli's mother
- Bryan Brown as Slim Halliday, Gus and Eli's babysitter
- Anthony LaPaglia as Tytus Broz, boss and drug dealer
- Sophie Wilde as Caitlyn Spies, newspaper journalist
- Toby Schmitz as Detective Tim Cotton, corrupt police officer
- Christopher James Baker as Ivan Kroll, standover man/drug dealer
- Deborah Mailman as Poppy Birkbeck, guidance counsellor
- Adam Briggs as Alex Bermuda, Eli's pen pal, bikie in prison
- HaiHa Le as Bich Dang, restaurant owner, drug importer, and supplier
- Zachary Wan as Darren Dang, Bich Dang's son
- Ben O'Toole as Teddy Callis, Lyle's former best friend
- Rob Carlton as Brian Robertson
- Emily Eskell as PC Daley, police officer
- Michael Denkha as George Masoumi, Slim's friend
- Eloise Rothfield as Shelly Huffman, school student (age 13)
  - Millie Donaldson as Shelly Huffman (age 17)
- Matthew Knight as a prison guard, Boggo Road Gaol
- Isaac Strutt–Stevens as Christopher, hospital cancer patient
- Drew Matthews as Titch
- Peter Phan as Tony Leung
- Kate Box as Dr Brennan

== Episodes ==
No.	Title	Directed by	Original release date
1	"Boy Smells Rat"	Bharat Nalluri	11 January 2024
2	"Boy Gets Chop"	Bharat Nalluri	11 January 2024
3	"Run Boy Run"	Jocelyn Moorhouse	11 January 2024
4	"Boy Loses Dad"	Jocelyn Moorhouse	11 January 2024
5	"Boy Takes Flight"	Jocelyn Moorhouse	11 January 2024
6	"Boy Seeks Work"	Kim Mordaunt	11 January 2024
7	"Boy Meets End"	Kim Mordaunt	11 January 2024

== Production ==
=== Development ===
The television adaptation rights of Trent Dalton's novel Boy Swallows Universe were acquired by Brouhaha Entertainment, Anonymous Content, and Chapter One. On 4 March 2022, it was announced that an 8-episode limited series had been commissioned by Netflix, with producers Andrew Mason and Troy Lum of Brouhaha Entertainment, Sophie Gardiner of Chapter One, and Kerry Kohansky-Roberts and Toby Bentley of Anonymous Content.

=== Casting ===
It was revealed on 31 August 2022 that Felix Cameron would be playing the leading character, Eli Bell, and other main cast members included Lee Tiger Halley, Travis Fimmel, Simon Baker, Phoebe Tonkin, Bryan Brown, Anthony LaPaglia, and Sophie Wilde. Christopher James Baker, Deborah Mailman, Ben O'Toole, and others also landed roles.

=== Filming ===
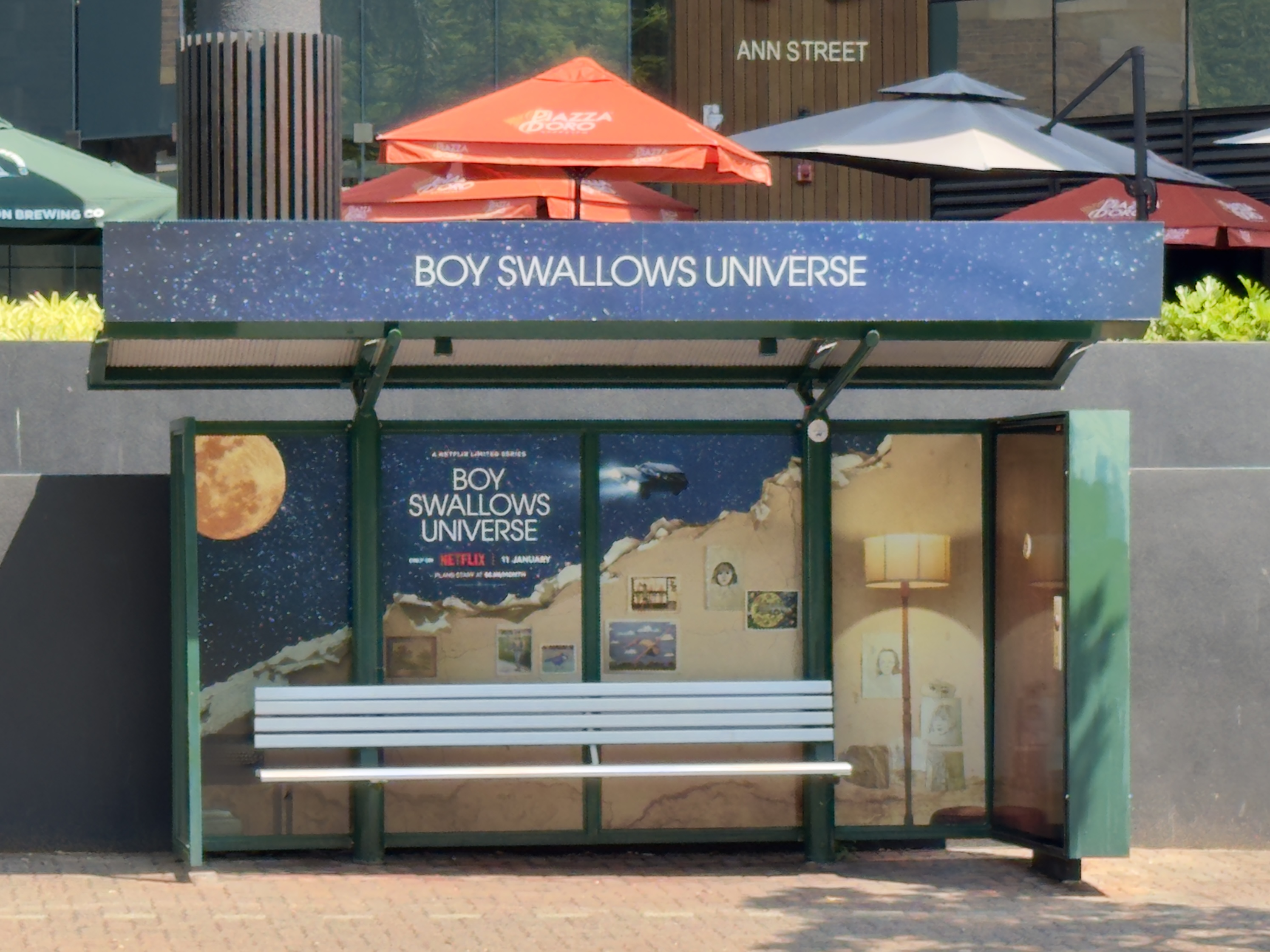
Bus stop advertisement for the series in Brisbane

Shelley Farthing-Dawe is the main cinematographer of the series. Principal photography for the series reportedly began in August 2022, with filming beginning in Brisbane. A house in Beenleigh was used for Lyle and Frankie's house while Robert's house was located in Wavell Heights. The scenes of the family buying a secondhand Atari console were filmed in Chelmer.

The train scenes in Episode 6 were filmed at Doomben Station (which appeared in the guise of Bowen Hills Station), with an EMU set partially repainted and re-upholstered to resemble the way the sets looked in the 1980s. EMU 42 was used during filming. The scene where Eli and Caitlin have a conversation on the train was filmed on a special service run between Doomben and Ipswich.

== Reception ==
=== Critical response ===
Review aggregator Rotten Tomatoes gives the series an 85% approval rating based on 13 reviews.

Luke Buckmaster, reviewing the series for The Guardian, rated it four stars out of five. Kylie Northover reviewing the series for The Sydney Morning Herald rated the series as five stars out of five, "As in the book, the mood is a tightrope walk between despair and childish optimism; the brothers' lives are shaped by trauma, but this sprawling story is infused with humour and great warmth, even for the adults who have let them down."

Jessica Baker of WhoWhatWear wrote that Phoebe Tonkin "is in the midst of a transformative period. Coming off a truly spectacular dramatic performance in Boy Swallows Universe." Dalton, who wrote the novel the series is based on, also praised Tonkin's performance, stating "Phoebe went right ahead and gave a performance across eight hours of television that is so raw and exposing and true and dark-as-night-sometimes and so filled with light and hope and heart and LOVE that it reminded me why I wanted to write Boy Swallows Universe in the first place."

=== Accolades ===
At the 2024 Logie Awards, the series received a record 10 nominations. These included nominations for Best Miniseries or Telemovie, Best Lead Actor (for Cameron and Baker), Best Lead Actress (for Tonkin), Best Supporting Actor (for Brown, Halley and Fimmel) and Best Supporting Actress (for Wilde), and the Graham Kennedy Award for Most Popular New Talent (for Cameron and Halley). The series won 5 Logies during the award ceremony.

Logie Awards
Year	Award	Category	Winner	Result	Ref
2024	Silver Logie	Best Supporting Actress	Sophie Wilde	Won	
2024	Graham Kennedy Award	Most Popular New Talent	Felix Cameron	Won	
2024	Silver Logie	Best Supporting Actor	Bryan Brown	Won	
2024	Silver Logie	Best Miniseries or Telemovie		Won	
2024	Silver Logie	Best Lead Actor in a Drama	Felix Cameron	Won	
