= The Gathering (TV series) =

British Television series

- Genre: Thriller
- Created by: Helen Walsh
- Written by: Helen Walsh
- Directed by: Gareth Bryn; Amanda Blue
- Starring: Sadie Soverall; Eva Morgan; Vinette Robinson; Warren Brown; Max Johnson; Richard Coyle
- Country of origin: United Kingdom
- Original language: English
- No. of series: 1
- No. of episodes: 6

Production
- Executive producers: Simon Heath; Laura Cotton; Helen Walsh; Graham Bryn
- Producer: Graham Drover
- Production company: World Productions

Original release
- Network: Channel 4
- Release: 14 May – 29 May 2024

The Gathering is a British mystery thriller television series for Channel 4 written by Helen Walsh. The series was broadcast from 14 May to 29 May 2024 for six episodes.

== Synopsis ==
A girl is attacked at a rave in Merseyside, with the perpetrator being from a group of suspects from a wide range of backgrounds. The producer Simon Heath called the series "an exploration of toxic teenagers - and their even more toxic parents".

== Cast ==
- Sadie Soverall as Jessica
- Eva Morgan as Kelly
- Vinette Robinson as Natalie
- Warren Brown as Paul
- Richard Coyle as Jules
- Sonny Walker as Adam
- Luca Kamleh-Chapman as Bazi
- Hebron Tedros as Dessie
- Max Johnson as Tate
- Dylan Thomas-Smith as Oscar
- Christine Tremarco as Carianne
- Mia Carragher as Tash
- Charity Bedu-Addo as Sonia
- Shaun Mason as Nathan
- Emma Bispham as Sendco
- Charlie Griffiths as Security Guard

== Production ==
The six-part series marks the television writing debut for novelist Helen Walsh. The series is produced by World Productions and was commissioned by Channel 4 in 2022. The series is directed by Gareth Bryn and Amanda Blue, and produced by Graham Drover, with executive producers Simon Heath, Laura Cotton, alongside Walsh and Bryn.

Filming got underway in Liverpool in July 2023. Filming locations in Liverpool included outside the Liverpool Empire Theatre on William Brown Street. By October 2023, filming had moved to The Wirral. Filming locations included Red Rocks in Hoylake, King's Drive in Caldy, the Witley estate in Moreton, Black Horse Hill Junior School, and Benllech in Anglesey.

== Broadcast ==
The six-part series aired in the UK on Channel 4 from 14 May 2024.

== Episodes ==
No.	Title	Directed by	Written by	Original release date
1	"Episode 1"	Gareth Bryn	Helen Walsh	14 May 2024
2	"Episode 2"	Gareth Bryn	Helen Walsh	15 May 2024
3	"Episode 3"	Amanda Blue	Helen Walsh	21 May 2024
4	"Episode 4"	Amanda Blue	Helen Walsh	22 May 2024
5	"Episode 5"	Gareth Bryn	Helen Walsh	28 May 2024
6	"Episode 6"	Gareth Bryn	Helen Walsh	29 May 2024

== Reception ==
=== Critical response ===
Lucy Mangan of The Guardian awarded the series three stars out of five, remarking "It all works well enough, while remaining slightly underbaked. You feel as though a decision should have been taken earlier on to decide which, among the many things it almost is, it should have properly been. A murder mystery? An interrogation of class and its barriers? A drama for and about teenage lives and concerns? A portrait of the toll elite sports take on their participants? It gestures towards all of these but doesn’t deliver satisfactorily on any count."

Steven McIntosh of the BBC, while bemoaning the clichéd flash-forward in the opening scene of the series, said, "but once the plot spools back and the series finds its groove, it is superb. The Gathering is filled with well-rounded, believable characters who grapple with a smorgasbord of contemporary themes."

=== Awards and nominations ===
Year	Award	Category	Nominee	Result	Ref.
2024	Monte-Carlo Television Festival	Best Series	The Gathering	Won	
2024	Monte-Carlo Television Festival	Best Actor	Warren Brown	Won	
2024	Monte-Carlo Television Festival	Best Actress	Eva Morgan	Won	
2025	British Academy Television Awards	Best Supporting Actor	Sonny Walker	Nominated	
