= Felix Cameron =

Australian actor

- Born: 5 April 2009 (age 17)
- Occupation: Actor
- Notable work: Boy Swallows Universe

Felix Cameron is an Australian actor. He won the 14th AACTA Awards AACTA Award for Best Lead Actor in a Television Drama and the 2024 Logie Awards for Most Popular New Talent and Best Lead Actor in a Drama all for his performance in Boy Swallows Universe. Cameron was previously in the film Penguin Bloom (2020).
