= Goolagong (miniseries) =

2026 Australian TV miniseries

- Genre: Biopic
- Written by: Steven McGregor; Megan Simpson Huberman
- Directed by: Wayne Blair
- Starring: Lila McGuire; Felix Mallard; Marton Csokas; Luke Carroll
- Music by: Cornel Wilczek and Alex Olijnyk
- Country of origin: Australia
- Original language: English
- No. of seasons: 1
- No. of episodes: 3

Production
- Producers: Danielle MacLean and Joanna Werner
- Cinematography: Katie Milwright
- Editor: Angie Higgins
- Production company: Werner Film Productions

Original release
- Network: ABC Television
- Release: 4 January 2026

Goolagong is an Australian television drama miniseries for ABC Television, released on 4 January 2026. Based on the real life story of Aboriginal Australian champion tennis player Evonne Goolagong Cawley, played by Lila McGuire, the series was directed by Wayne Blair and produced by Werner Film Productions.

== Plot ==
The series tells the story of the rise of tennis star Evonne Goolagong Cawley, from her childhood through to becoming a champion at Wimbledon. It shows her drive to succeed and her path to the top of her game, including overcoming a career-threatening injury and beating her tennis rivals in the face of adversity.

== Cast ==
The cast for the series was named on 27 June 2025.

- Lila McGuire as Evonne Goolagong Cawley
  - Eloise Hart as Young Evonne
  - Riley Clare as Middle Evonne
- Luke Carroll as Kenny Goolagong
- Chenoa Deemal as Linda Goolagong
- Marton Csokas as Vic Edwards
- Belinda Woolcock as Margaret Court
- Felix Mallard as Roger Cawley
- Rhys Muldoon as Bill Kurtzman
- Courtney Clarke as Chris Evert
- Elizabeth Cullen as Trisha Edwards

== Production ==
On 4 February 2019, it was announced that the series, along with several other projects, had received funding for development. It had been in active development for some time. On 27 June 2025, it was announced that the three-part series had officially gone into production in Victoria, after spending nine years in development. Funding was secured from VicScreen and Screen Australia. ABC executive producers for the series were Brett Sleigh and ABC Head of Scripted Rachel Okine.

Goolagong was produced by Danielle MacLean and Joanna Werner through Werner Film Productions, a Melbourne-based company acquired by BBC Studios in 2024 (previously responsible for The Newsreader and Dance Academy). Stuart Menzies and Joanna Werner were executive producers. Goolagong and her husband Roger Cawley worked as associate producers. The series was directed by Wayne Blair and written by Steven McGregor and Megan Simpson Huberman. The music was composed by Cornel Wilczek and Alex Olijnyk (Note: The pair have worked together before, in 2025 winning Best Music for a Television Drama in the 2025 Screen Music Awards in Brisbane, for Fake. At the same awards, Wilczek won Best Opening Title Television Theme, with Thomas Rouch, for the Netflix series The Survivors.) and Angie Higgins was responsible for editing the series.

Katie Milwright was director of photography on the series. Filming for the series took place across several locations in Victoria, including on location at the Kooyong Tennis Club and South Yarra Tennis Club, using a purpose-built Wimbledon Centre Court. Other locations include Kyneton, Seaford, Seymour, Sunshine, Tallarook, and Woodend. Post-production and visual effects work also took place in Victoria. The shoot brought in over 1,200 local jobs and 100 jobs for local crew.

On 20 November 2025, it was announced at the ABC Upfronts that the series would go to air in 2026.

== Broadcast ==
The series premiered on ABC TV and ABC iview on 4 January 2026.

BBC Studios is handling international sales. It premiered in the UK on BBC Four on 20 June 2026.

== Reception ==
The series was well-reviewed in the Australian press, with major outlets unanimously rating it 4 stars out of 5. Luke Buckmaster of The Guardian gave the series 4 stars, calling Lila McGuire's performance "outstanding", and the story unfolding over "three well-paced, captivating and graceful episodes". The Age's Karl Quinn also gave 4 out of 5, calling it "a smashing biopic", and calling McGuire's performance "tremendous".

David Knox of TV Tonight also rated the miniseries 4 out of 5 stars, citing actress Lila McGuire as a captivating Evonne. Anthony Morris at ScreenHub also gave 4 stars, calling the tone "thoughtful" and praising the series for avoiding clichés.

Liza-Mare Syron, Indigenous Scientia Senior Lecturer at UNSW Sydney, writing for The Conversation, called the series "a compelling and inspiring mini-series – a story for all Australians" and "Evonne is portrayed by the remarkable Whadjuk and Wardandi Noongar actress Lila McGuire, who delivers a sublime performance that compellingly showcases Goolagong's vulnerability, resilience, grace and fighting spirit". She also praises the "well-structured" story, Katie Milwright's cinematography, and "the moody echoes and rhythmic undertones of composers Cornel Wilczek and Alex Olijnyk".

At the 2026 Logie Awards, Goolagong won the Logie for Best Miniseries or Telemovie, and Lila McGuire won the Graham Kennedy Award for Most Popular New Talent. McGuire also received a nomination for Best Lead Actress in a Drama, while Hart was nominated for Graham Kennedy Award for Most Popular New Talent.
