= Lila McGuire =

Australian actress

- Education: Western Australian Academy of Performing Arts
- Occupations: Actress, Dancer
- Years active: 2024-present
- Known for: Goolagong

Lila McGuire is an Australian actress. She played the lead role of Evonne Goolagong Cawley in 2026 Australian biographical television series Goolagong (2026) and won the Logie Award for Most Popular New Talent.

== Early life and education ==
A Whadjuk and Ballardong Noongar woman, Lila McGuire grew up in South Australia, later living in Queensland and in Perth, Western Australia.

She is a graduate of the Western Australian Academy of Performing Arts at Edith Cowan University in Perth.

== Career ==
McGuire spent four years performing as a dancer with the Mayakeniny Dancers for Perth Festival, as well as the Evernow company and Boomerang & Spear.

She had her first professional acting role on television as Alice Jinx in the second series of The Twelve for Fox Showcase.

McGuire played the eponymous lead role of Wiradjuri Australian tennis player Evonne Goolagong Cawley in 2026 ABC biographical television series Goolagong. She received critical praise for her nuanced performance, with Luke Buckmaster writing in The Guardian that she "patiently and vividly ekes out Goolagong’s multitudes". For the role, she was nominated at the Logie Awards of 2026 for Best Lead Actress in a Drama and won the Logie Award for Most Popular New Talent.

McGuire plays a police officer in Australian crime drama series Dustfall. In 2026, she joined the cast of Australian and British drama series Two Birds for Stan and ITV1.

== Filmography ==
Key
†	Denotes works that have not yet been released

Year	Title	Role	Notes
2024	The Twelve	Alice Jinx	6 episodes
2026	Goolagong	Evonne Goolagong Cawley (lead role)	Miniseries
2026	Dustfall	Talia Walker	Miniseries

== Accolades ==
Awards and nominations received by Lila McGuire
Year	Organisations	Category	Nominated work	Result	Ref.
2026	Logie Awards	Best Lead Actress In A Drama	Goolagong	Nominated	
2026	Logie Awards	Most Popular New Talent	Goolagong	Won	
