= Brian Murphy (detective) =

Victorian police detective

Brian "The Skull" Murphy
- Born: Brian Francis Murphy; March 12, 1933; South Melbourne
- Died: April 25, 2023 (aged 90); Middle Park, Victoria
- Other name: "The Skull"
- Occupation: Sergeant Detective
- Years active: 1954–1978
- Employer: Victoria Police
- Awards: Victoria Police Valour Medal

Brian Francis Murphy (1933 – 2023), more commonly known by the nickname "The Skull", was an Australian detective based in Melbourne. He was a central figure in creating the Costigan Commission.

== Early life and career ==
Brian Francis Murphy was born in South Melbourne into a Catholic family to Reg and Maggie Murphy. As a child, he attended St. Peter and Paul's Catholic Church with his five siblings.

Murphy was a notorious detective sergeant in the Melbourne Police force who had a reputation for his unorthodox methods of policing. He joined the police force in 1954, only gaining public notoriety in 1971 during the Collingburn case. Throughout his career, he maintained relationships with criminals in Victoria including Dennis Bruce Allen and Billy "The Texan" Longley. He was allegedly targeted by Christopher Dale Flannery after his attempts to catch and indict him for his murders.

After a confrontation with an armed gunman in 1975, Murphy was awarded the Victoria Police Valour Medal. He was later pictured with the medal in 1976, posing with his daughter.

Murphy was speculated to have shot and killed Raymond "The General" Bennett in 1979 after an armed robbery. He denied those claims and instead claimed Bennett's killer was Brian Kane.

In 1986, the police created a task force, code-named Cobra, to target corrupt police officers who were alleged in protecting the illegal massage parlor industry during the 1970s and 1980s, with Murphy implicated as a high-ranking target. In total, 805 people were interviewed, culminating in 170 witnesses to give evidence of corrupt policing practices. Murphy's close colleague, Senior Sergeant Paul William Higgins, was charged and suspended. Murphy was never found guilty of corruption.

As a retired detective, Murphy was hired by Judy Moran to track down Lewis Moran's investments after his death. In 2011, he testified at Judy Moran's Supreme Court murder trial. She was later found guilty and sentenced to 26 years in jail for the murder of Desmond "Tuppence" Moran.

=== Costigan Commission ===
Due to Murphy's extensive list of informants and criminal connections, he was able to receive information on criminal activities of the Painters and Dockers from Billy "The Texan" Longley. He later helped The Bulletin magazine publish an exposé on the Painters and Dockers that led to the Costigan royal commission. After his involvement for exposing the corruption, he was targeted by the Painters and Dockers.

=== Collingburn Case ===
In March 1971, Niel Stanley Collingburn, a notorious criminal in Melbourne, was arrested by two policemen. Later that night, Murphy was present when Collingburn died at the hands of the police. There was conflicting evidence of the means and who was involved, with witnesses changing their story of Murphy and Stillman's involvement in Collingburn's death. The general accusation is that Stillman and Murphy attacked Collingburn, causing fatal injuries.

Murphy and Carl Stillman were charged with manslaughter after the death of Collingburn on April 8, 1971. They were acquitted by a jury in Melbourne in 1972.

== In popular culture ==
- In 2019, his career was profiled in an episode of Australian Crime Stories, an Australian true crime TV show, entitled "Murphy's Law."
- He was the subject of Vikki Petraitis' 2018 book, "Once a Copper: The Life and Times of Brian 'The Skull' Murphy."
- In 2010, Adam Shand wrote a biography about Murphy, entitled "The Skull: Informers, Hit Men and Australia’s Toughest Cop."
- He has been the subject of true crime podcast episodes, including from the Criminal Fugitives podcast and multiple episodes on Adam Shand's podcast Adam Shand at Large.
