= Publican (disambiguation) =

Publican or The Publican may refer to:

- The owner or manager of a pub (public house)
- One of the publicani (singular publicanus), a public contractor or tax collector in the Roman Republic and Empire.
- The Publican, a British magazine
- Publicans, another name for the Christian denomination Arnoldists

== See also ==
- Pharisee and the Publican, a parable of Jesus
- This Publican, a 1938 novel by Dornford Yates
- Public (disambiguation)
