= Rowan Witt =

Australian actor

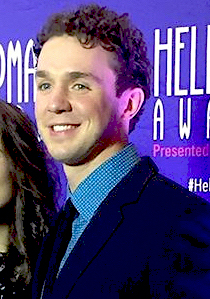
- Witt at the Helpmann Awards in 2016
- Education: Sydney Conservatorium of Music
- Occupation: Actor
- Years active: 1999–present
- Website: rowanwitt.com

Rowan Witt is an Australian film, television and theatre actor. He is known for starring in stage productions of The Book of Mormon, Hamilton, Totally Completely Fine, She Loves Me, Dogfight, Gloria, Into The Woods and South Pacific, the television series Home and Away and his role as 'Spoon Boy' in The Matrix.

== Early life ==
Witt was born in Australia. His high school graduating artwork topped the state, and was exhibited at the NSW Art Gallery, and was awarded the Julian Ashton drawing scholarship. Witt also undertook intensive acting training throughout school.

Witt then attended the Sydney Conservatorium of Music, where he studied a Bachelor of music performance, majoring in classical voice. He also trained in acting at various notable institutions including ATYP and NIDA, with a background in theatre and improvisation.

== Career ==
Witt was discovered at an early age and began working extensively in film and television, including a role in 1999 sci-fi film The Matrix playing 'Spoon Boy', alongside Keanu Reeves. Also in 1999, he played Frankie in drama film Somewhere in the Darkness. In 2001, he had a recurring guest role in long-running soap opera Home and Away, as runaway child, Toni Davidson. That same year, he landed the role of Oliver Twist in children's series Escape of the Artful Dodger in 2001.

Witt was short-listed to the final few for the titular role of Harry in the Harry Potter film franchise and was notably, the only Australian actor to be flown to Leavesden Studios in England to screen-test.

In 2010, the same year he graduated from the Conservatorium, Witt had a role in the third season of true crime series Underbelly and also played Leaf Coneybear in a stage production of William Finn's The 25th Annual Putnam County Spelling Bee.

In 2012, Witt appeared in a musical theatre production of South Pacific at the Sydney Opera House for The Lincoln Centre. It was the highest selling show in the opera house's history and starred Teddy Tahu Rhodes and Lisa McCune. The following year, he had a role in drama film Adoration opposite Naomi Watts, Robin Wright and Ben Mendelsohn.

Witt landed the role of Jack, in the 2014 Australian production of Into The Woods, at the Melbourne Arts Centre, for which he garnered critical acclaim. That same year, he played John Hinckley in the Australian tour of Sondheim's Assassins.

Witt was then cast in the 2015 Australian premiere of Pasek and Paul's musical, Dogfight, at the Hayes Theatre, as the abusive Vietnam marine, Bernstein. Midway through the season of Dogfight, Witt was cast and started work on Cameron Mackintosh's production of Les Misérables (25th anniversary production), performing and rehearsing both shows simultaneously.

In 2016, Witt played Young Buddy in the acclaimed concert production of Sondheim's Follies, opposite Philip Quast, Debra Byrne, Lisa McCune, and David Hobson. He also appeared as Danny in the musical Baby at the Hayes Theatre.

Witt's breakout role came as Elder McKinley in the original Australian cast of musical The Book of Mormon, both at The Princess Theatre in Melbourne and the Sydney Lyric Theatre in Sydney. For this role, he won several awards including a 2018 Sydney Theatre Award, and a 2017 Helpmann Award nomination. The production boasted the biggest opening sales of any musical in Australia's history, selling more than $5 million worth of tickets in the first few hours.

Directly after The Book of Mormon, Witt signed on as the romantic lead in the acclaimed revival of Bock and Harnick's She Loves Me at the Hayes Theatre, before playing Dean in the acclaimed Sydney premiere of Brandon Jacobs-Jenkins' play, Gloria. For both roles he was nominated for Broadway World and Sydney Theatre Awards.

In 2021, Witt starred opposite Katherine Parkinson (The IT Crowd) in the Paramount+ original television series Spreadsheet. He also originated the role of Chandler Bing in the Australian stage production of Friends: the Musical. Then from 2022 to 2023, Witt took up the role of King George III in the Australian stage production of Hamilton. It was during this period that he was cast in Sundance's dark comedy television series Totally Completely Fine, in which he starred as John, opposite Thomasin McKenzie, and Devon Terrell.

In 2025, Witt starred as Sean, partner of Kate (played by Tamala Shelton) and one of the living characters in Ghosts, an Australian adaptation of the British sitcom of the same name.

== Personal life ==
Witt has a sister, a pop musician, who performs under the stage name, ELKI.

== Awards ==
Year	Work	Award	Category	Result	Ref.
2017	The Book of Mormon	Helpmann Awards	Best Male Actor in a Supporting Role in a Musical	Nominated	
2018	The Book of Mormon	Sydney Theatre Awards	Best Male Performer in a Supporting Role in a Musical	Won	
2018	The Book of Mormon	Glugs Theatrical Awards	Most Outstanding Performance by an Actor in a Supporting Role in a Musical	Nominated	
2018	She Loves Me	Glugs Theatrical Awards	Most Outstanding Performance by an Actor in a Musical	Nominated	
2018	She Loves Me	Sydney Theatre Awards	Best Male Performer in a Lead Role	Nominated	
2019	Gloria	Sydney Theatre Awards	Best Male Performer in a Supporting Role	Nominated	

== Filmography ==
=== Film ===
Year	Title	Role	Notes	Ref.
1999	Somewhere in the Darkness	Frankie		
1999	The Matrix	Spoon Boy		
2002	Little Blue	Steven	Short film	
2010	Thick as Thieves	Thomas	Short film	
2011	X: Night of Vengeance	Luke		
2011	3:12	Tom	Short film	
2011	Sean & Marcus	Sean	Short film	
2012	Pride	Jarvis	Short film	
2013	Adoration	Oswald	(aka Adore or Two Mothers)	
2013	Trunk	Neil	Short film	
2027	Spaceballs: The New One	TBA	Post-production	

=== Television ===
Year	Title	Role	Notes	Ref.
2001	Home and Away	Toni Davidson	16 episodes	
2001	Escape of the Artful Dodger	Oliver Twist	13 episodes	
2010	Underbelly: The Golden Mile	Koala	1 episode	
2011	The Gruen Transfer: The Pitch	Sam		
2011	Second Skin	Bobby		
2012	People You May Know	Cyrano		
2013	Nick & Seaton's Palace of Sexy Secrets	Rowan	2 episodes	
2021	Spreadsheet	Alex Ryan	8 episodes	
2023	Wellmania	Jesse	1 episode	
2023	Totally Completely Fine	John Cunningham	6 episodes	
2025	Ghosts: Australia	Sean	8 episodes	
2025	All Her Fault	Brendan Hill	Miniseries, 2 episodes	

== Stage ==
=== As actor ===
Year	Title	Role	Notes	Ref.
2001	Die Zauberflöte	Second Spirit	Opera Australia	
2002	The Turn of the Screw	Miles	Opera Australia	
2008	By Jeeves	Augustus 'Gussie' Fink	Genesian Theatre, Sydney	
2008	The Magic Flute	Papageno	National Youth Opera	
2010	The 25th Annual Putnam County Spelling Bee	Leaf Coneybear	Squeaky Floor Productions	
2010	Il Campanello	Fabio Panettone	Sydney Conservatorium of Music	
2010	Opera by Candlelight	Principal Soloist	Opera By Candlelight	
2012–2013	South Pacific	Professor	Sydney Opera House with Lincoln Center Theatre	
2014	Into the Woods	Jack	Playhouse, Melbourne with Victorian Opera	
2014	Assassins	John Hinckley Jr.	West Gippsland Arts Centre with Auspicious Arts Projects	
2015	Bye Bye Birdie	Randolph Macafee	Seymour Centre, Sydney with Squabbalogic	
2015	Hats Off! To the Hits		Seymour Centre, Sydney	
2015	Les Misérables	Claquesous	Capitol Theatre, Sydney, QPAC, Brisbane	
2015	Dogfight	Bernstein	Hayes Theatre Co, Sydney	
2015	Mystery Musical	Randolph	Squabbalogic	
2016	Follies in Concert	Young Buddy	Melbourne Recital Centre with Storeyboard Entertainment	
2016	Kiss Me, Kate	Gremio / Aide / Dance Captain	Seymour Centre, Sydney	
2016	Baby	Danny	Hayes Theatre Co, Sydney	
2017	The Book of Mormon	Elder McKinley	Princess Theatre, Melbourne, Sydney Lyric Theatre	
2018	She Loves Me	Georg Nowack	Hayes Theatre Co, Sydney	
2019	Good Omens	Newt / various	Squabbalogic	
2019	Gloria	Dean / Devin	Seymour Centre, Sydney with Outhouse Theatre Co	
2021	Friends: the Musical	Chandler Bing	SK Entertainment	
2022	Hamilton	King George III	Her Majesty's Theatre, Melbourne	
2026	Dirty Rotten Scoundrels	Freddy Benson	Hayes Theatre Co, Sydney	

=== As writer ===
Year	Title	Role	Notes	Ref.
2015	My Vagabond Boat	Writer	Adelaide Festival Centre	

== Video games ==
Year	Title	Role	Notes
2005	The Matrix: Path of Neo	Spoon Boy	Video game
2023	Ty the Tasmanian Tiger 4: Bush Rescue Returns	Julius the Koala	Video game
