= Anna Torv =

Australian actress (born 1979)

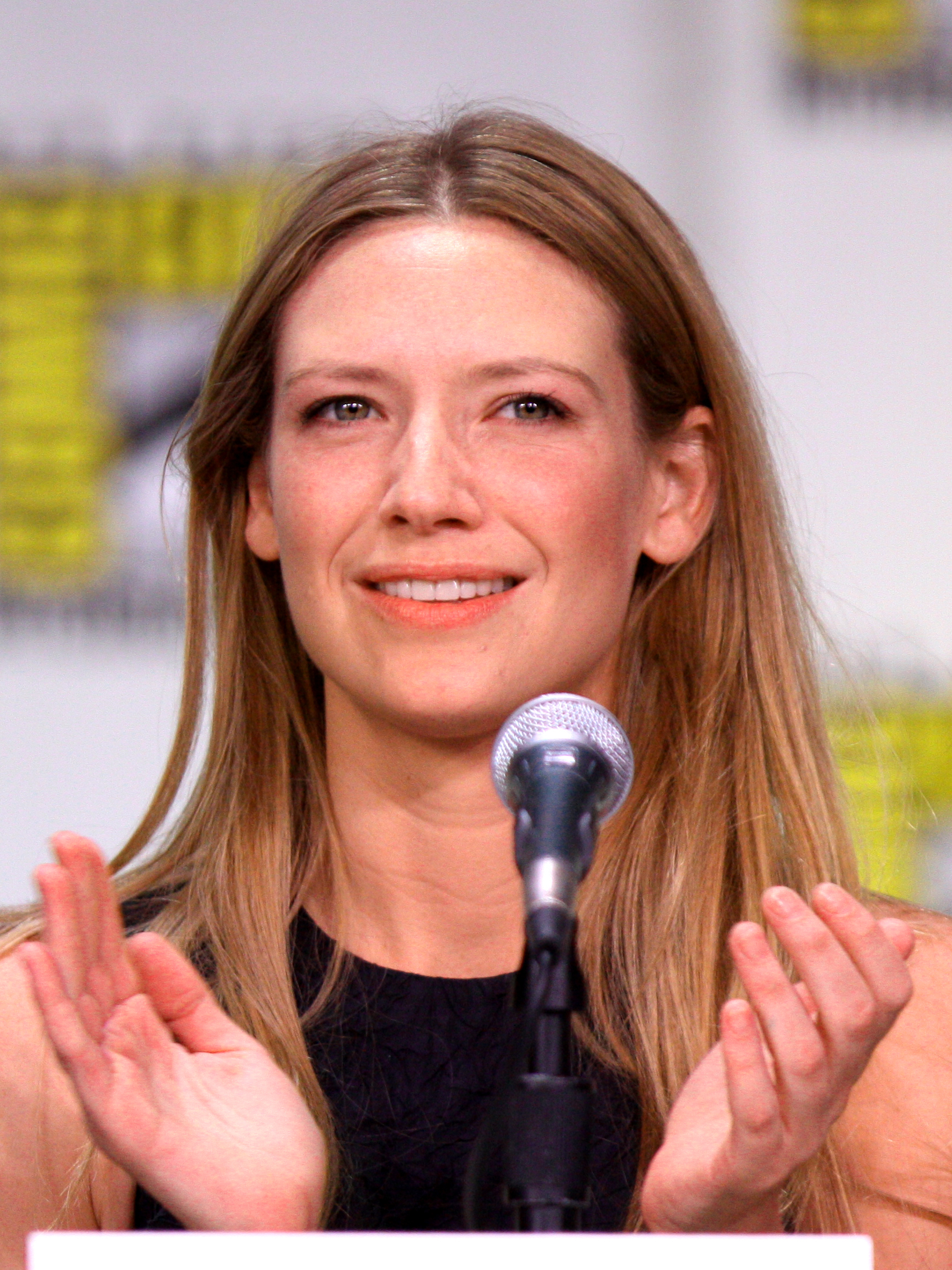
- Torv in 2011
- Born: 7 June 1979 (age 47); Melbourne, Victoria, Australia
- Education: National Institute of Dramatic Art (BFA)
- Occupation: Actress
- Years active: 2001–present
- Spouse: Mark Valley (m. 2008, separated)
- Relatives: Anna dePeyster (aunt); Elisabeth Murdoch (cousin); Lachlan Murdoch (cousin); James Murdoch (cousin)

Anna Torv (born 7 June 1979) is an Australian actress. Her performance as Olivia Dunham in the Fox science fiction series Fringe (2008–2013) earned her four consecutive Saturn Awards for Best Actress on Television, a record for any performer. She portrayed psychologist Wendy Carr in the Netflix period crime drama Mindhunter (2017–2019) and Tess in the HBO post-apocalyptic drama series The Last of Us (2023). Her work on The Last of Us garnered her a Primetime Emmy Award nomination for Outstanding Guest Actress in a Drama Series. She is known in Australia for the ABC drama The Newsreader, for which she won three consecutive AACTA Awards. She starred in the Netflix drama series Territory, set in Australia's Northern Territory, which premiered in October 2024.

== Early life ==
Torv was born in Melbourne on 7 June 1979, the daughter of Susan (née Carmichael), of Scottish descent, and Hans Arvid Torv (Tõrv), a property developer and radio presenter of Estonian ancestry. At age six, she moved with her mother and younger brother to the Gold Coast, where she grew up, attending Benowa State High School, from which she graduated in 1996. As of 2008, Torv had been estranged from her father for many years.

Torv's paternal aunt, journalist Anna dePeyster, was married to media mogul Rupert Murdoch for 31 years. Through that marriage, Torv is a cousin of Elisabeth, Lachlan, and James Murdoch.

Following her high school graduation, Torv relocated to Sydney, New South Wales, where she had been accepted into the National Institute of Dramatic Art (NIDA) at the age of 17. As she was too young to get an electricity account on her own, or to go to pubs, she decided to take a "gap year", during which she worked as cafe and bar staff. She graduated with a performing arts degree in 2001.

== Career ==
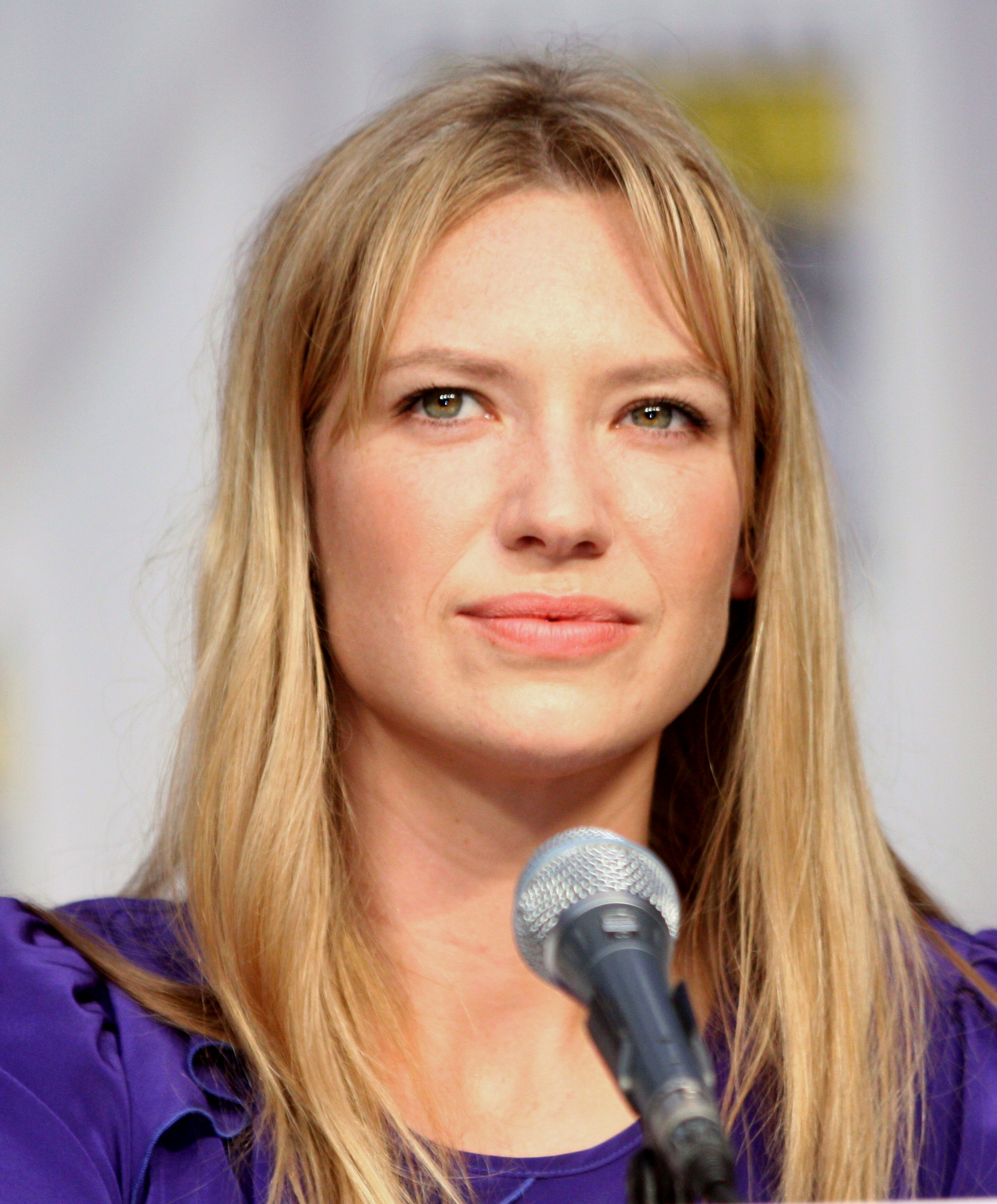
Torv in July 2010

In 2003, Torv played the role of Ophelia with the Bell Shakespeare Company in John Bell's production of Hamlet. In 2004, she joined the cast of Australia's acclaimed television drama The Secret Life of Us, playing Nikki Martel.

In 2005, Torv recorded a series of audio books for Scholastic Australia's Solo Collection, including the titles Little Fingers, Jack's Owl, Spike, and Maddy in the Middle, and later did voice work and performance capture for the role of Nariko in the 2007 video game Heavenly Sword.

She then appeared in the BBC series Mistresses in 2008. From 2008 to 2013, Torv played Agent Olivia Dunham in the American television series Fringe. She received an Australians in Film Breakthrough award in 2009. She has been nominated five times for the Saturn Award for Best Television Actress from 2009 to 2013, winning a total of four times. Torv appeared as Virginia Grey on HBO's mini-series The Pacific and later starred in a CollegeHumor Original video as a tyrannical traffic cop. In 2014, Torv reprised her role as Nariko in the film adaptation of Heavenly Sword.

In March 2016, Torv was cast in the role of Dr. Wendy Carr, an FBI consultant, in the Netflix drama Mindhunter.

In July 2021, Torv was cast in the role of Tess in the HBO post-apocalyptic series The Last of Us. The show premiered in January 2023; despite being a guest role, Torv's performance was seen as an early highlight, with Bernard Boo of Den of Geek writing: "With just about an episode and a half, the terrific Anna Torv leaves an indelible impression as Joel's no-nonsense ride-or-die Tess before literally exiting the series with a bang [...]". For the series, she was nominated for a Primetime Emmy Award for Outstanding Guest Actress in a Drama Series, marking her first ever Emmy nomination.

Torv played newsreader Helen Norville in the ABC series The Newsreader, released in August 2021, which was set in an Australian TV newsroom in the mid-1980s. The series returned for a second season in November 2023. Torv won the AACTA Award for Best Lead Actress in a Drama Series three times for her performance as Norville, once for each season. For the first season, she won the 2022 Logie Award for Most Outstanding Actress, and the series also won the Logie Award for Most Outstanding Drama Series. She was nominated for a second Logie for the second season.

In 2021, Torv also appeared in the television series Fires, produced by the ABC Television network, about the 2019–20 Australian bushfire season, in which megafires devastated Australia.

In October 2024, Torv appeared in the Netflix series Territory.

On 20 November 2025, Torv was named a lead in the new ABC series Dustfall.

== Personal life ==
In December 2008, Torv married American actor Mark Valley, with whom she co-starred in Fringe. In April 2010, it was reported that the couple had separated several months previously.

Torv lived in Los Angeles for over a decade, up until shortly after the COVID-19 pandemic began in early 2020. During her time there, she bought a house. She then sold her home and returned to Australia's Gold Coast in early 2020, where she stayed with her mother before moving to Melbourne to film The Newsreader.

As of 2021, Torv does not use social media. As of January 2024, Torv lives in northern New South Wales.

== Filmography ==
=== Film ===
Year	Title	Role	Notes
2003	Travelling Light	Debra Fowler	
2006	The Book of Revelation	Bridget / Gertrude	
2014	Heavenly Sword	Nariko (voice)	
2014	Love Is Now	Virginia Grey	
2015	The Daughter	Anna	
2017	Stephanie	Jane	
2023	Scarygirl	The Keeper (voice)	
2024	Force of Nature: The Dry 2	Alice Russell	

=== Television ===
Year	Title	Role	Notes
2002	White Collar Blue	Neighbour	Television film
2002	Young Lions	Irena Nedov	Recurring role (series 1)
2004	McLeod's Daughters	Jasmine McLeod	2 episodes
2004–2005	The Secret Life of Us	Nikki Martel	Recurring role (series 4)
2007	Frankenstein	ITU nurse	Television film
2008	Mistresses	Alex	Recurring role (series 1)
2008–2013	Fringe	Olivia Dunham	Main role
2010	The Pacific	Virginia Grey	Episode: "Peleliu Landing"
2011	The Cleveland Show	Herself	Episode: "A Short Story and a Tall Tale"
2011	CollegeHumor Originals	Officer Alia	Episode: "Can I Give You a Ticket?"
2014	Open	Windsor	Episode: "Pilot"
2015	Deadline Gallipoli	Gwendoline Churchill	Main role; miniseries
2016–2019	Secret City	Harriet Dunkley	Main role
2017–2019	Mindhunter	Wendy Carr	Main role
2021	Fires	Lally Robinson	2 episodes
2021–2025	The Newsreader	Helen Norville	Main role
2023	The Last of Us	Tess	3 episodes
2024	Nautilus	Revna	1 episode
2024	Territory	Emily Lawson	Main role
2024	So Long, Marianne	Charmian Clift	Main role
2026	Dustfall	Tig Pollard	Main role

=== Theatre ===
Year	Title	Role	Venue	Notes
1986	The Night Before Christmas	Bess	Roman Scandals Theatre Restaurant	
1998–2001	Undiscovered Country	Unknown	Unknown	Credited from playbill of the 2003 production of Hamlet
1998–2001	Bodyline: Time's Up	Unknown	Unknown	Credited from playbill of the 2003 production of Hamlet
1998–2001	Richard III	Unknown	Unknown	Credited from playbill of the 2003 production of Hamlet
1998–2001	Basic Burlesque	Unknown	Unknown	Credited from playbill of the 2003 production of Hamlet
2001	Plenty	Susan Traherne	NIDA Theatre	2 April 2001
2001	Language of the Gods	Alicia	NIDA Theatre	5 May 2001
2001	Ring Round the Moon	Capulat	NIDA Studio	27 June 2001
2001	Goodnight Children Everywhere	Ann	NIDA Studio	28 September 2001
2001	Kiss Me, Kate	Chorus Girl	Parade Theatre	17 October 2001
2002	The Credeaux Canvas	Amelia	SBW Stables Theatre	In association with the Griffin Theatre Company
2003	Hamlet	Ophelia	Bell Shakespeare	
2005	The Cherry Orchard	Anya	Sydney Theatre Company	

=== Video games ===
Year	Title	Role	Notes
2007	Heavenly Sword	Nariko (voice)	Also motion capture

== Awards and nominations ==
Year	Award	Category	Work	Result	Ref.
2008	NAVGTR Awards	Lead Performance in a Drama	Heavenly Sword	Nominated	
2009	Saturn Awards	Best Actress on Television	Fringe	Won	
2009	Teen Choice Awards	Choice TV Actress Fantasy/Sci-Fi	Fringe	Nominated	
2009	Scream Awards	Breakout Performance – Female	Fringe	Nominated	
2010	Saturn Awards	Best Actress on Television	Fringe	Won	
2010	Scream Awards	Best Television Performance	Fringe	Nominated	
2010	Teen Choice Awards	Choice TV Actress Fantasy/Sci-Fi	Fringe	Nominated	
2011	Saturn Awards	Best Actress on Television	Fringe	Won	
2011	International Online Cinema Awards	Best Actress in a Drama Series	Fringe	Nominated	
2011	Scream Awards	Best Science Fiction Actress	Fringe	Nominated	
2011	Critics' Choice Television Awards	Best Actress in a Drama Actress	Fringe	Nominated	
2011	Teen Choice Awards	Choice TV Actress Fantasy/Sci-Fi	Fringe	Nominated	
2012	Saturn Awards	Best Actress on Television	Fringe	Won	
2012	IGN Awards	Best TV Actress	Fringe	Nominated	
2012	Teen Choice Awards	Choice TV Actress Fantasy/Sci-Fi	Fringe	Nominated	
2013	Saturn Awards	Best Actress on Television	Fringe	Nominated	
2016	AACTA Awards	Best Supporting Actress	The Daughter	Nominated	
2017	Logie Awards	Most Outstanding Actress	Secret City	Won	
2019	AACTA Awards	Best Lead Actress in a Television Drama	Secret City	Nominated	
2021	AACTA Awards	Best Lead Actress in a Television Drama	The Newsreader	Won	
2022	Logie Awards	Most Popular Actress	The Newsreader	Nominated	
2022	Logie Awards	Most Outstanding Actress	The Newsreader	Won	
2022	Equity Ensemble Awards	Outstanding Performance by an Ensemble Series in a Drama Series	The Newsreader	Won	
2023	Online Film & Television Association	Best Guest Actress in a Drama Series	The Last of Us	Nominated	
2023	International Online Cinema Awards	Best Guest Actress in a Drama Series	The Last of Us	Nominated	
2023	Gold Derby Awards	Drama Guest Actress	The Last of Us	Nominated	
2023	TV Scholar Awards	Best Guest Performance in a Drama	The Last of Us	Nominated	
2023	MTV Movie Awards	Best Kiss	The Last of Us	Nominated	
2024	Primetime Emmy Awards	Outstanding Guest Actress in a Drama Series	The Last of Us	Nominated	
2024	CinEuphoria Awards	Merit - Honorary Award Shared with the cast	The Last of Us	Won	
2024	AACTA Awards	Best Lead Actress in a Television Drama	The Newsreader	Won	
2024	Logie Awards	Best Lead Actress in a Drama	The Newsreader	Nominated	
2025	AACTA Awards	Best Actress in a Leading Role	Force of Nature: The Dry 2	Nominated	
2025	AACTA Awards	Best Lead Actress in a Television Drama	Territory	Nominated	
2025	Logie Awards	Best Lead Actress in a Drama	Territory	Nominated	
2026	AACTA Awards	Best Lead Actress in a Television Drama	The Newsreader	Won	
