= Exposure (Australian TV series) =

Australian drama television miniseries

- Genre: Thriller
- Created by: Lucy Coleman
- Written by: Lucy Coleman
- Directed by: Bonnie Moir
- Starring: Alice Englert; Thomas Weatherall; Mia Artemis; Essie Davis
- Composer: Mikey Young
- Country of origin: Australia
- Original language: English
- No. of series: 1
- No. of episodes: 6

Production
- Executive producers: Nicole O'Donohue; Justin Kurzel; Shaun Grant
- Producer: Nicole O'Donohue
- Cinematography: Aaron McLisky
- Running time: 30 minutes

Original release
- Network: Stan
- Release: 20 June 2024

Exposure is an Australian thriller television series broadcast by Stan in 2024. It was created by Lucy Coleman and stars Alice Englert.

== Synopsis ==
The series follows a photographer, Jacs, investigating the suicide of her friend.

== Cast ==
- Alice Englert as Jacs Gould
- Thomas Weatherall as Angus
- Mia Artemis as Kel Summer
- Essie Davis as Kathy
- Sean Keenan as Raffa
- Daniel Frederiksen as Barry
- Victoria Haralabidou as Val
- Thom Green as Bronson
- George Mason as Mick
- Saskia Hampele as Faye

== Release ==
The series was broadcast on Stan on 20 June 2024.

== Reception ==
Writing in The Guardian, Luke Buckmaster gave it 3 stars out of 5. He writes "But the pacing in this series is a little off, with an airiness that loosens some of the key dramatic pivots. Coleman’s script avoids going over these with highlighter pen, which of course isn’t necessarily a bad thing, but it does engender a circular momentum that sometimes extracts the pith from the drama, loosening its impact."

Laura Brodnik of Mamamia wrote "This is also a series that deftly handles its subject matter, never shying away from trauma, grief or pain. It is a story that invites the audience to sit in life's hardest moments, never throwing a Hollywood gloss over the most troubling scenes, all while examining the complexity of how these moments came to be."

== Awards ==
- 14th AACTA Awards
  - Best Miniseries - Nicole O'Donohue, Shaun Grant, Justin Kurzel - nominated
  - Best Supporting Actress in a Drama - Essie Davis - nominated
  - Best Cinematography in Television - Aaron McLisky - nominated
  - Best Editing in Television - Leila Gaabi (Episode 5) - nominated
  - Best Production Design in Television - Marni Kornhauser (Episode 5) - nominated
  - Best Original Score in Television - Mikey Young (Episode 5) - nominated
  - Best Sound in Television - Paul Finlay, Andrew Miller, Joe Mount, Jared Dwyer (Episode 5) - nominated
