= The Narrow Road to the Deep North =

(The) Narrow Road to the Deep North may refer to:

- Narrow Road to the Deep North, a 1968 satirical play on the British Empire by the English playwright Edward Bond
- The Narrow Road to the Deep North (novel), a 2013 novel by Australian writer Richard Flanagan
  - The Narrow Road to the Deep North (miniseries), a 2025 TV miniseries based on the book
- Oku no Hosomichi, translated as The Narrow Road to the Deep North, a major work by Japanese poet Matsuo Bashō
