= Logie Awards of 2026 =

Australian television awards ceremony

66th Logie Awards
- Date: 16 August 2026
- Site: The Star, Sydney, New South Wales
- Hosted by: Robert Irwin
- Official website: tvweeklogies.com.au

Highlights
- Gold Logie: Sam Pang
- Hall of Fame: Deborah Mailman; A Country Practice; Andrew Denton
- Most awards: Have You Been Paying Attention?, Goolagong and Dog Park (2)
- Most nominations: The Narrow Road to the Deep North (6)

Television coverage
- Network: Seven Network

The 66th Annual TV Week Logie Awards ceremony was held on 16 August 2026 at The Star, Sydney and broadcast on the Seven Network. The ceremony was hosted by Robert Irwin, who at 22 years of age, was the youngest host in the ceremony's history. The awards also commemorated the 70th anniversary of Australian television.

== Nominees ==
Nominees were announced on 22 June 2026.

=== Gold Logie ===
Most Popular Personality on Australian Television
- Sam Pang in Sam Pang Tonight, Have You Been Paying Attention?, The Front Bar and Logie Awards 2025 (Network 10/Seven Network)
  - Ally Langdon in A Current Affair, The Great Debate, Election 2025: Australia Decides, Winter Olympic Games 2026 and Parental Guidance (Nine Network)
  - Julia Morris in I'm a Celebrity...Get Me Out of Here! (Network 10)
  - Lisa Millar in Muster Dogs, Muster Dogs: Where Are They Now and Back Roads (ABC)
  - Poh Ling Yeow in MasterChef Australia (Network 10)
  - Robert Irwin in I'm a Celebrity...Get Me Out of Here! (Network 10)
  - Todd Woodbridge in Tipping Point Australia, Australian Open, Winter Olympic Games 2026, Roland Garros 2025, Wimbledon 2025, US Open 2025 and Cross Court (Nine Network)

=== Acting/Presenting ===
Best Lead Actor in a Drama	Best Lead Actress in a Drama
Sam Neill in The Twelve: Cape Rock Killer (Binge/Foxtel) (posthumous); Hunter Page-Lochard in Reckless (SBS/NITV); Jacob Elordi in The Narrow Road to the Deep North (Amazon Prime Video); Mark Coles Smith in Mystery Road: Origin (ABC); Rob Collins in RFDS (Seven Network); Steve Peacocke in RFDS (Seven Network)	Brooke Satchwell in Dear Life (Stan); Aisha Dee in Watching You (Stan); Lila McGuire in Goolagong (ABC); Odessa Young in The Narrow Road to the Deep North (Amazon Prime Video); Tuuli Narkle in Mystery Road: Origin (ABC); Yerin Ha in The Survivors (Netflix)
Best Supporting Actor in a Drama	Best Supporting Actress in a Drama
Simon Baker in The Narrow Road to the Deep North (Amazon Prime Video); Clarence Ryan in Mystery Road: Origin (ABC); Damien Garvey in The Survivors (Netflix); Daniel Henshall in The Family Next Door (ABC); Thomas Weatherall in Heartbreak High (Netflix); Thomas Weatherall in The Narrow Road to the Deep North (Amazon Prime Video)	Claudia Karvan in Homebodies (SBS); Catherine McClements in The Survivors (Netflix); Eleanor Matsuura in Dear Life (Stan); Heather Mitchell in The Narrow Road to the Deep North (Amazon Prime Video); Philippa Northeast in The Family Next Door (ABC); Robyn Malcolm in The Survivors (Netflix)
Best Actor in a Comedy	Best Actress in a Comedy
Steve Bisley in Deadloch (Amazon Prime Video); Ben Miller in Austin (ABC); George Zhao in Ghosts Australia (Paramount+); Leon Ford in Dog Park (ABC); Matt Day in Strife (Binge/Foxtel); Michael Theo in Austin (ABC)	Celia Pacquola in Dog Park (ABC); Asher Keddie in Strife (Binge/Foxtel); Denise Scott in Mother and Son (ABC); Kate Box in Deadloch (Amazon Prime Video); Madeleine Sami in Deadloch (Amazon Prime Video); Michelle Brasier in Ghosts Australia (Paramount+)
Ray Martin Award for Most Popular News or Public Affairs Presenter	Bruce McAvaney Award for Most Popular Sports Presenter
Ally Langdon in A Current Affair, The Great Debate and Election 2025: Australia Decides (Nine Network); David Speers in Australia Votes 2025: Election Night Live and Insiders (ABC); Karl Stefanovic in Today (Nine Network); Michael Usher in Seven News and Seven News Spotlight (Seven Network); Sarah Abo in Today (Nine Network); Sarah Ferguson in 7.30 and Australia Votes 2025: Election Night Live (ABC)	Jelena Dokic in Australian Open, 2025 Melbourne Cup, Wimbledon 2025, Roland Garros 2025, US Open 2025 and Cross Court (Nine Network); Bruce McAvaney in World Athletics Championships Tokyo 2025 (SBS); Danika Mason in Today, NRL and Freddy and the Eighth (Nine Network); Eddie McGuire in Footy Classified Tuesday and 2025 Melbourne Cup Carnival (Nine Network); James Bracey in Nine News, NRL, 100% Footy, 2026 Winter Olympic Games and Australian Open, 2025 Melbourne Cup and Australian Swimming Trials (Nine Network); Ricky Ponting in The Ashes 2025–26 (Seven Network)
Graham Kennedy Award for Most Popular New Talent	Bert Newton Award for Most Popular Presenter
Lila McGuire in Goolagong (ABC); Andrea Lam in The Piano (ABC); Eloise Hart in Goolagong and Mystery Road: Origin (ABC); Rowan Witt in Ghosts Australia (Paramount+); Stuart Broad in The Ashes 2025–26 (Seven Network); Tamala in Ghosts Australia (Paramount+)	Robert Irwin in I'm a Celebrity...Get Me Out of Here! (Network 10); Amanda Keller in The Piano (ABC); Hamish Blake in Lego Masters (Nine Network); Julia Morris in I'm a Celebrity...Get Me Out of Here! (Network 10); Larry Emdur in The Chase (Seven Network); Lisa Millar in Muster Dogs, Muster Dogs: Where Are They Now and Back Roads (ABC)

=== Programs ===
Best Drama Program	Best Miniseries or Telemovie
RFDS (Seven Network); Dear Life (Stan); Heartbreak High (Netflix); Mystery Road: Origin (ABC); The Twelve: Cape Rock Killer (Binge/Foxtel); Watching You (Stan)	Goolagong (ABC); Homebodies (SBS); Mix Tape (Binge/Foxtel); The Family Next Door (ABC); The Narrow Road to the Deep North (Amazon Prime Video); The Survivors (Netflix)
Best Entertainment Program	Best Current Affairs Program
Tipping Point Australia (Nine Network); Australian Idol (Seven Network); Dancing with the Stars (Seven Network); The 1% Club (Seven Network); The Floor (Nine Network); The Piano (ABC)	Australian Story (ABC); 60 Minutes (Nine Network); 7.30 (ABC); A Current Affair (Nine Network); Four Corners (ABC); Today (Nine Network)
Best Scripted Comedy Program	Best Comedy Entertainment Program
Dog Park (ABC); Austin (ABC); Deadloch (Amazon Prime Video); Strife (Binge/Foxtel); The Artful Dodger (Disney+); Top End Bub (Amazon Prime Video)	Have You Been Paying Attention? (Network 10); Gruen Nation (ABC); Guy Montgomery's Guy Mont-Spelling Bee (ABC); Hard Quiz (ABC); The Cheap Seats (Network 10); The Front Bar (Seven Network)
Best Competition Reality Program	Best Structured Reality Program
MasterChef Australia (Network 10); Big Brother (Network 10); I'm a Celebrity...Get Me Out of Here! (Network 10); Lego Masters (Nine Network); Love Island Australia (Nine Network); The Block (Nine Network)	Muster Dogs (ABC); The Farmer Wants a Wife (Seven Network); Gogglebox Australia (Network 10); Married at First Sight (Nine Network); The Golden Bachelor (Nine Network); The Hospital: In The Deep End (SBS)
Best Lifestyle Program	Best News Coverage or Public Affairs Report
Travel Guides (Nine Network); Getaway (Nine Network); Grand Designs Australia (ABC); Love It or List It Australia (Binge/Foxtel); Selling Houses Australia (Binge/Foxtel); The Dog House Australia (Network 10)	"Bondi Terror Attack" (Seven News and Sunrise, Seven Network); "Fighting Back" (A Current Affair, Nine Network); "Hammered: Inside the Bunnings Machine" (Four Corners, ABC); "Iran War" (Seven News, Seven Network); "Out of Order" (60 Minutes, Nine Network); "Virginia's Final Wish" (60 Minutes, Nine Network)
Best Factual or Documentary Program	Best Sports Coverage
The Assembly (ABC); But Also John Clarke (ABC); Revealed: Death Cap Murders (Stan); Revealed: Joh – Last King of Queensland (Stan); The People vs Robodebt (SBS); The Secret DNA of Us (SBS)	2026 Australian Open (Nine Network); 2025 Melbourne Cup Carnival (Nine Network); 2025 Men's & Women's State of Origin Series (Nine Network); 2025 AFL Grand Final (Seven Network); Winter Olympic Games 2026 (Nine Network); The Ashes 2025–26 (Seven Network)
Best Children's Program
Play School (ABC); Do Not Watch This Show (ABC); Dreaming Big (NITV); Ginger and the Vegesaurs (ABC); Hard Quiz Kids (ABC); Knee High Spies (ABC)

== Changes ==
The awards included a new category, with the inaugural Bruce McAvaney Award for Most Popular Sports Presenter introduced to the ceremony.

=== 70th anniversary of television ===
To commemorate the 70th anniversary of Australian television, during the ceremony there were three inductees inducted into the Logie Hall of Fame for the year.

Additionally, TV Week conducted a poll in which readers could vote to determine the top 70 shows in Australian television. 140 shows were shortlisted by the magazine and voters could add their own shows if they did not appear on the list. Voting concluded on 21 June 2026, with the results set to be honoured in the Logie Awards ceremony.
