= Thomas Weatherall =

Australian actor (born 2000)

- Born: 22 August 2000 (age 26); Rockhampton, Queensland, Australia
- Education: Marymount College, Gold Coast
- Occupations: Actor; playwright
- Years active: 2018–present

Thomas Weatherall (born 22 August 2000) is an Australian actor and playwright. He gained recognition for his performances in the television series RFDS (2019–2021) and Heartbreak High (2022–2026), earning the AACTA Award and Logie Award for his portrayal of Malakai Mitchell in the latter. He has since starred in the war drama miniseries The Narrow Road to the Deep North (2025).

On stage, Weatherall has written and starred in the one-man play Blue, from 2019.

== Early life and education ==
Thomas Weatherall was born on 22 August 2000 in Rockhampton, Queensland, Australia. He is a Kamilaroi man.

As an infant, Weatherall moved to the Gold Coast and grew up in the coastal city where he attended Marymount College and was an active member of the cultural team, including cultural and mob captain in his final year in 2017. At Marymount, Weatherall played the role of Lonny Barnett / Record executive in the college's 2017 production of Rock of Ages.

As a child, he wanted to be a dancer when he grew up, and trained hard for this goal. However, he heard about ABC Television auditioning for roles in Deadlock (2018) during his last year of high school, and decided to give it a try. After landing the role, he found that he loved acting, and went on to study drama at Queensland University of Technology. As his screen career took off, he dropped out.

== Career ==
=== Beginnings (2018–2021) ===
Weatherall's first acting role was in the award-winning ABC miniseries Deadlock. He was in drama school and working in a shoe shop when he won the role for Seven Network's RFDS, which he went for mainly for the chance to play Rob Collins' son in the medical drama. On 18 August 2024, it was announced that a third season of the series with production moving from Broken Hill to South Australia due to upgrades at the real Broken Hill base. Weatherall would be returning for the series third season.

=== Breakthrough (2022–present) ===
He came to international prominence in the 2022 Netflix series Heartbreak High. The series became one of the streaming service's most-watched English-spoken series, making the Top 10 in Australia as well as 45 other countries in September 2022.

He also had roles in the ABC series All My Friends Are Racist and Troppo.

Weatherall's playwriting debut came with the play Blue, which he started writing in 2019 based on old high school diary entries, as "self-prescribed therapy". After winning a Balnaves Fellowship to complete the play, he fictionalised it further, and performed in the Belvoir Theatre production of it in Sydney in 2023. The play, which is in the form of a dramatic monologue, had a successful season at the Belvoir. In March 2024 a Belvoir production was presented by State Theatre Company South Australia at the Adelaide Festival in Adelaide, South Australia, with Callan Purcell in the starring role. In May 2024 Weatherall once again starred in a production of Blue at Brisbane's La Boite Theatre.

Weatherall starred opposite Jacob Elordi in the 2025 adaptation of Richard Flanagan's novel The Narrow Road to the Deep North as a TV series for Prime Video. Weatherall was later announced as part of the cast for Disney+ series Last Days of the Space Age.

On 2 February 2026, Weatherall was named in the cast for SBS drama The Airport Chaplain.

== Recognition and awards ==
- 2021: Balnaves Fellowship, awarded by the Belvoir theatre company to an emerging Indigenous playwright
- 2022: AACTA Award for Best Guest or Supporting Actor in a Television Drama, for his performance in Heartbreak High
- 2023: Logie Award for Most Outstanding Supporting Actor

== Filmography ==
Television
Year	Title	Role	Notes	Ref
2018	Deadlock	Aero	5 episodes	
2021	All My Friends Are Racist	Luke	2 episodes	
2021–present	RFDS	Darren Yates	15 episodes	
2022	Troppo	Charlie	6 episodes	
2022–2026	Heartbreak High	Malakai Mitchell	Main role, 16 episodes; also co-writer of episode:"Cuckoo, B****es!"	Won AACTA Award for Best Supporting Actor in a Television Drama (2022) and Logie Award for Most Outstanding Supporting Actor (2023); Nominated for AACTA Audience Choice Award for Best Actor (2022), AACTA International Award for Best Actor in a Series (2022), and Logie Award for Best Supporting Actor in a Drama (2026)
2024	Exposure	Angus	Main role; 6 episodes	
2024	Last Days of the Space Age	Bilya	8 episodes	
2025	The Narrow Road to the Deep North	Frank Gardiner	5 episodes	Nominated for Logie Award for Best Supporting Actor in a Drama (2026)
2026	The Airport Chaplain	Johnny Flick	TV series	
TBA	Careless	TBA	TV series	

== See also ==
- List of Australian film actors
