= Justin Kurzel =

Australian film director

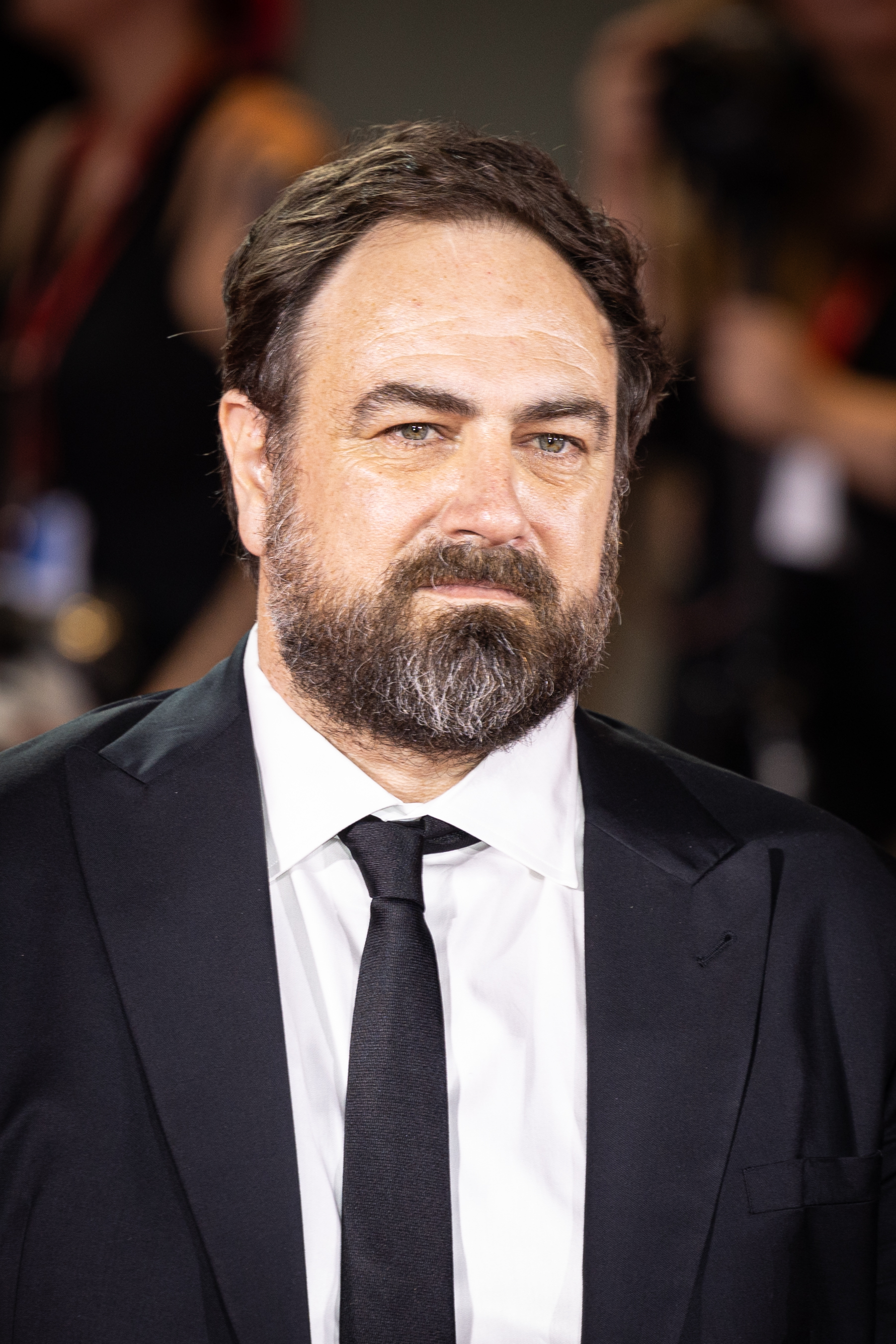
- Kurzel in 2024
- Born: c. 1974 (age 51–52); Gawler, South Australia, Australia
- Occupations: Film director; film producer
- Years active: 2001–present
- Spouse: Essie Davis (m. 2002)
- Children: 2

Justin Dallas Kurzel (/kɜːrˈzɛl/; born c. 1974) is an Australian film director. His films include Snowtown (2011), Macbeth (2015), Assassin's Creed (2016), True History of the Kelly Gang (2018), Nitram (2021) and The Order (2024).

== Early life & Education ==
Justin Dallas Kurzel was born around 1974 in Gawler, South Australia to a Polish father and a Maltese mother. His younger brother, Jed Kurzel, is a blues rock musician who has scored all of Justin's feature films.

He first trained at the National Institute of Dramatic Art, graduating with a Bachelor of Dramatic Art (Design) in 1995, and then later studied at the Victorian College of the Arts School of Film and Television.

== Career ==
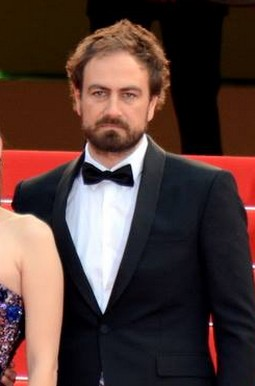
Kurzel in 2015

In 1999 Kurzel was awarded a Mike Walsh Fellowship. His Victorian College of the Arts graduating short film Blue Tongue (2004) screened in over 13 international films festivals and won Best Short at the Melbourne International Film Festival.

Kurzel's feature film debut was Snowtown (2011), for which he won the AACTA Award for Best Direction. Though controversial for its violence, the film was generally praised and holds an 84% on Rotten Tomatoes with the critic consensus: "It's a bleak and brutal endurance test, but for viewers with the strength and patience to make it to the end, Snowtown will prove an uncommonly powerful viewing experience." The film marked Kurzel's first collaboration with writer Shaun Grant.

His 2015 film adaptation of William Shakespeare's Macbeth was selected to compete for the Palme d'Or at the 2015 Cannes Film Festival.

In 2016, Kurzel directed Assassin's Creed, based on the video game franchise of the same name.

Kurzel directed True History of the Kelly Gang in 2018, adapted from Peter Carey's 2001 Man Booker Prize-winning novel of the same name, written from the viewpoint of legendary Australian bushranger and outlaw Ned Kelly. The film premiered at the 2019 Toronto International Film Festival and was released in Australian cinemas in 2020.

Kurzel was attached to direct multiple episodes of Apple TV's television adaptation of the 2003 novel Shantaram. However, Kurzel departed the project during a production hiatus in February 2020.

In late 2020, it was announced Kurzel would direct Nitram, a film depicting the events leading up to the Port Arthur massacre. The film was nominated for the Palme d’Or at the 2021 Cannes Film Festival.

In 2019, it was announced Kurzel would adapt Richard Flanagan's Booker Prize-winning novel The Narrow Road to the Deep North for television, with frequent collaborator Shaun Grant. The series entered production in 2023, with Jacob Elordi and Ciarán Hinds attached in the leading role.

Ellis Park, a documentary by Kurzel about musician Warren Ellis and the animal sanctuary he co-founded, premiered at the Melbourne International Film Festival in August 2024.

== Personal life ==
Kurzel is married to actress Essie Davis. They have twin daughters.

== Filmography ==
=== Feature film ===
Year	Title	Director	Producer	Notes
2011	Snowtown	Yes	No	Also story writer
2015	Macbeth	Yes	No	
2016	Assassin's Creed	Yes	No	
2019	True History of the Kelly Gang	Yes	Yes	
2021	Nitram	Yes	Yes	
2024	The Order	Yes	Yes	
TBA	Burning Rainbow Farm	Yes	Yes	Filming

=== Television ===
Year	Title	Director	Executive Producer	Note
2025	The Narrow Road to the Deep North	Yes	Yes	5 episodes
2025	Black Rabbit	Yes	No	Episodes 7 and 8

=== Short film ===
Year	Title	Director	Writer	Notes
2004	Blue Tongue	Yes	Yes	Also editor
2013	Boner McPharlin's Moll	Yes	Yes	Segment of The Turning

=== Documentaries ===
Year	Title	Director	Executive Producer	Writer
2024	Ellis Park	Yes	Yes	Yes

=== Music video ===
Year	Artist	Title
2006	You Am I	"Friends Like You"

== Awards and nominations ==
AACTA Awards

Year	Title	Category	Result
2011	Snowtown	Best Direction	Won
2013	The Turning	Best Direction	Won
2021	Nitram	Best Film	Won
2021	Nitram	Best Direction	Won

Cannes Film Festival

Year	Title	Category	Result
2015	Macbeth	Palme d'Or	Nominated
2021	Nitram	Palme d'Or	Nominated

Other awards

Year	Award	Category	Title	Result
2011	Film Critics Circle of Australia	Best Direction	Snowtown	Won
2011	Inside Film Awards	Best Director	Snowtown	Nominated
2015	British Independent Film Awards	Best Director of a British Independent Film	Macbeth	Nominated
