= Shaun Grant =

Australian screenwriter

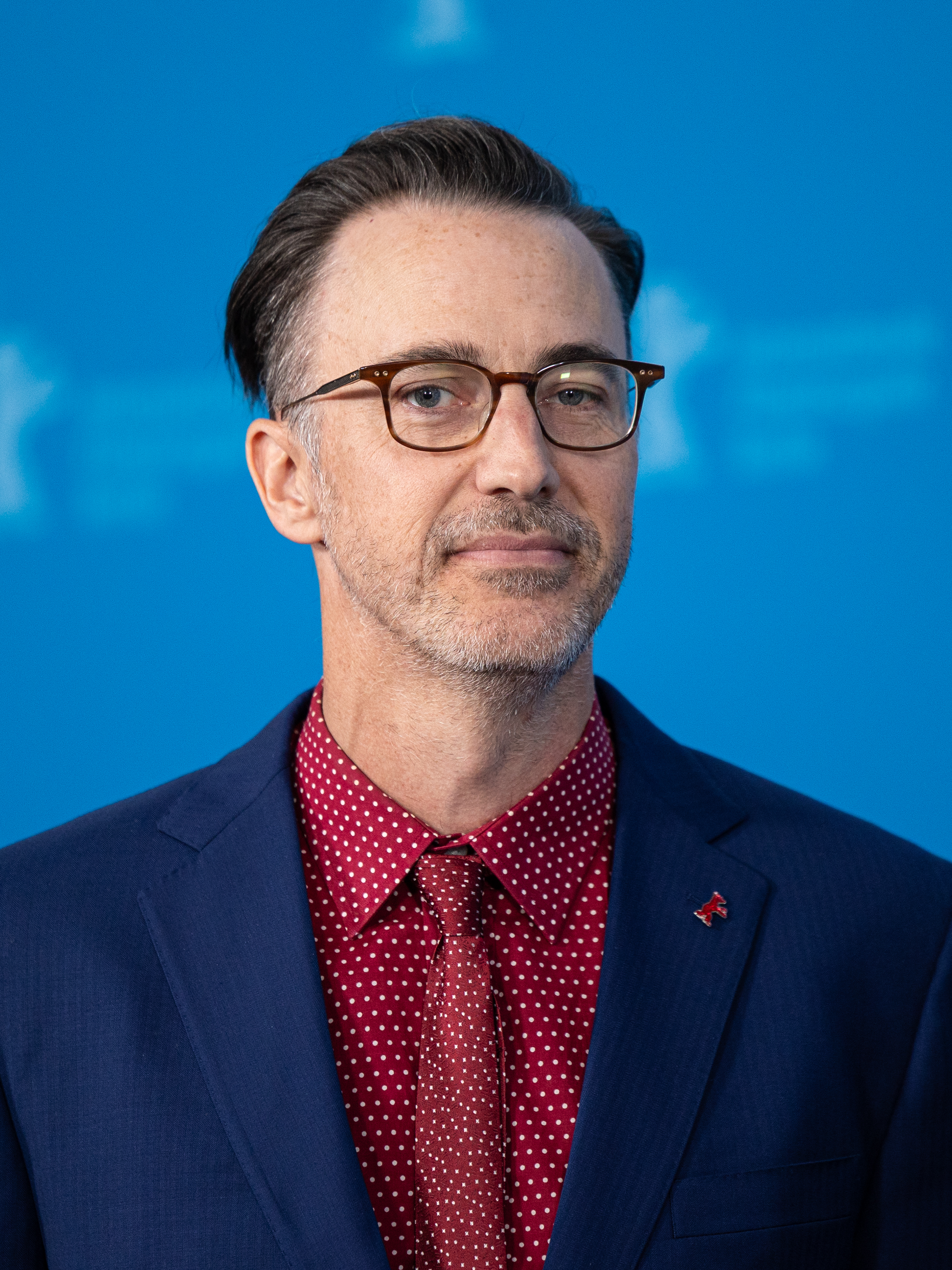
- Grant in 2025
- Born: 1978 or 1979 (age 47–48)
- Occupations: Screenwriter, Producer
- Known for: Nitram; Snowtown; Berlin Syndrome; Jasper Jones
- Spouse: Annabel Marshall-Roth

Shaun Grant is an Australian screenwriter and producer. He is well known for his frequent collaborations with Justin Kurzel; Snowtown (2011), True History of the Kelly Gang (2020) and Nitram (2021). Grant has also written screenplay adaptions for several Australian novels and worked on David Fincher's Mindhunter.

== Biography ==
=== Early life ===
Grant grew up living in a pub, located in the rural Victorian town of Malmsbury. While Grant always knew he wanted to be a filmmaker, his family convinced him there was no money in the profession.

Grant went on to spend eight and a half years working as a school teacher. In his spare time he began writing scripts and he eventually joined a nighttime creative writing course at the Royal Melbourne Institute of Technology.

=== Career ===
In 2007, Grant was babysitting his niece during a blackout. In search for something to read, he discovered his brother owned a book about the Snowtown murders. After finishing the book in one evening, Grant was compelled to put up his own money to option the screenplay rights. The script was found by a pair of producers, Anna McLeish and Sarah Shaw, who encouraged Grant to develop the screenplay with then up-and-coming director Justin Kurzel.

Kurzel and Grant's debut film Snowtown was released in 2011. The film received acclaim upon its screening at Cannes.

Following Snowtown, Grant decided to quit teaching and began writing for television. He secured a job on the show Killing Time, following a recommendation from the Snowtown script supervisor. Grant spent the next few years writing for shows like SLiDE, Janet King and Deadline Gallipoli.

Grant wrote the screenplay for the adaptations of two Australian books Berlin Syndrome and Jasper Jones, both of which were released in 2017.

In 2019, Grant continued his collaboration with Kurzel on The True History of the Kelly Gang, an adaption of Peter Carey's novel. The pair also began developing a series based on Richard Flanagan's Booker Prize winning Narrow Road to the Deep North. The series entered production in 2023, with Jacob Elordi attached in the starring role.

After Charlize Theron and David Fincher were impressed by Grant's work, they invited him to write the finale of the second season of Mindhunter. The episode, which aired in 2019, marked Grant's American television writing debut and became the series' final episode following its cancellation.

While Grant was living in Los Angeles in 2018, his wife narrowly missed experiencing a mass shooting in a supermarket. The close call made Grant reflect on the differences between Australian and American gun culture. Grant's considerations culminated in a screenplay he wrote in five weeks about the lead up to the Port Arthur Massacre. Nitram was directed by Kurzel and released in competition at the 2021 Cannes Film Festival.

Grant co-owns a production company, Thirdborn, with Justin Kurzel and Nicole O’Donohue.

== Personal life ==
Grant is married to Australian/American actress Annabel Marshall-Roth.

He is an avid supporter of Hawthorn Football Club.

== Filmography ==
Screenwriter

- Marx and Venus (2008) - 1 Episode
- Snowtown (2011)
- Killing Time (2011) - 2 Episodes
- SLiDE (2011) - 2 Episodes
- Janet King (2014) - 2 Episodes
- Deadline Gallipoli (2015) - 2 Episodes
- Berlin Syndrome (2017)
- Jasper Jones (2017)
- Mindhunter (2019) - 1 Episode
- True History of the Kelly Gang (2019)
- Penguin Bloom (2020)
- Nitram (2021)
- The Narrow Road to the Deep North (2024) - 5 Episodes

Producer

- True History of the Kelly Gang (2019)
- Nitram (2021)
- Exposure (2024)
- The Narrow Road to the Deep North (2024)
