= Mister Smith Entertainment =

British film distribution company

- Type: Public
- Industry: Motion pictures
- Founded: 1 May 2012; 14 years ago
- Founder: David Garrett
- Headquarters: 85 Charing Cross Road, London, England, UK
- Key people: David Garrett (CEO) Dave Mepham (COO)
- Services: Film distribution sales; Financing; Licensing; Film production
- Website: mistersmithent.com

Mister Smith Entertainment is a British film distribution company involved in the acquisition, financing, production, licensing and distribution sales of films for the global theatrical market. Founded by David Garrett and Constantin Film, Mister Smith was established on 1 May 2012.

== History ==
Mister Smith Entertainment was founded by David Garrett on 1 May 2012, as a joint venture between Garrett and Constantin Films. Garrett previously had founded Summit Entertainment where he served as president until his resignation in February 2012, following Summit's acquisition by Lionsgate. The company was established with Ralpho Borgos as chief of international licensing and distribution, and Annasivia Britt as vice president of the company's marketing and publicity department. The first film distributed by Mister Smith was The Mortal Instruments: City of Bones, which was acquired at the 2012 Cannes Film Festival.

Highlights include a six year partnership with Steven Spielberg’s DreamWorks Studios where Mister Smith was the exclusive international licensing partner for DreamWorks Studios films in Europe, the Middle East and Africa.

In 2023 Esme Grace, led by producer Laura Rister and entrepreneur Tom McLeod, invested in Mister Smith to create an alliance to develop prestige independent feature films.

== Filmography ==
Year	Film	Production companies
2013	The Mortal Instruments: City of Bones	Constantin Film Produktion GmbH, Don Carmody Productions, Unique Features
2013	3096 Days	Constantin Film
2013	The Fifth Estate	DreamWorks Pictures, Reliance Entertainment, Participant Media, Anonymous Content
2013	Delivery Man	DreamWorks Pictures, Reliance Entertainment
2014	Need for Speed	DreamWorks Pictures, Reliance Entertainment, Electronic Arts, Bandito Brothers,
2014	The Hundred-Foot Journey	DreamWorks Pictures, Reliance Entertainment, Amblin Entertainment, Harpo Films
2014	Love, Rosie	Constantin Film, Canyon Creek Films, Octagon Films
2014	The Water Diviner	RatPac Entertainment, Seven Network Australia, Hopscotch Features, Fear of God Films
2015	Danny Collins	Big Indie Pictures, ShivHans Pictures
2015	The Man Who Knew Infinity	Warner Bros. Pictures, Pressman Film, Xeitgeist Entertainment Group, Cayenne Pepper Productions
2016	Race	Forecast Pictures, Solofilms, Trinica, Trinity Race
2016	The BFG	Walt Disney Pictures, Amblin Entertainment, Reliance Entertainment, Walden Media, The Roald Dahl Story Company
2016	The Light Between Oceans	DreamWorks Pictures, Reliance Entertainment, Heydey Films
2016	Brain on Fire	Broad Green Pictures, Denver and Delilah Productions, Foundation Features
2016	The Girl on the Train	DreamWorks Pictures, Reliance Entertainment and Marc Platt Productions
2016	Office Christmas Party	DreamWorks Pictures, Reliance Entertainment, Entertainment 360, Bluegrass Films
2017	A Dog's Purpose	Amblin Entertainment, Reliance Entertainment, Walden Media, Pariah Entertainment Group
2017	Buena Vista Social Club: Adios	Broad Green Pictures, Convergent Media
2017	Wish Upon	Broad Green Pictures, Busted Shark Productions
2017	Thank You for Your Service	DreamWorks Pictures, Reliance Entertainment, Rahway Road Productions
2017	The Post	20th Century Fox, DreamWorks Pictures, Amblin Entertainment, Reliance Entertainment, Pascal Pictures
2018	Step Sisters	Los Angeles Media Fund
2018	Midnight Sun	Boies / Schiller Film Group, Rickard Pictures
2018	The House with a Clock in Its Walls	Amblin Entertainment, Reliance Entertainment, Mythology Entertainment
2019	The Elephant Queen	Deeble & Stone
2019	A Hidden Life	Fox Searchlight Pictures, Elizabeth Bay Productions, Aceway, Studio Babelsberg
2020	The Banker	Romulus Entertainment, Iam21 Entertainment, Mad Hatter, Hyphenate Films
2020	Black Beauty	Constantin Film
2020	The Sunlit Night	
2020	Jungleland	
2021	Palmer	Sidney Kimmel Entertainment, Rhea Films, Hercules Film Fund
2021	Wrong Turn: The Foundation	
2021	Tides	
2021	Werewolves Within	
2021	The Hating Game	Convergent Media, BCDF Pictures, Federal Films, Big Indie Pictures
2022	The Desperate Hour	Untapped, Boies/Schiller Entertainment, Limelight
2022	To Leslie	BCDF Pictures, Clair de Lune Entertainment
2022	The Storied Life of AJ Fikry	
2024	He Went That Way	Head Gear Films, Teashop Productions
2024	Which Brings Me to You	BCDF Pictures, Anonymous Content, Three Point Capital
2024	Riddle of Fire	ANAXIA
2024	Ezra	Wayfarer Studios, Closer Media
2024	The Convert	Jump Film & Television, Brouhaha Entertainment
2024	Greedy People	Limelight, Boies Schiller Entertainment, Hideout Pictures
2024	Stylebender	FluroBlack
2024	Bookworm	Firefly Films
2024	Midas Man	Studio POW, Trevor Beattie Films
2024	Young Werther	Wildling Pictures
2025	Grafted	International sales only
2025	The Threesome	Star Thrower Entertainment
2025	Dangerous Animals	Brouhaha Entertainment, LD Entertainment, Oddfellows Entertainment, and Range Media Partners
2025	Bone Lake	LD Entertainment
