= Vegesaurs =

- Created by: Gary Eck; Nick O'Sullivan
- Directed by: Steve Moltzen
- Countries of origin: Australia; France
- Original language: English

Production
- Executive producers: Patrick Elgerton; Gary Eck; Mick Sullivan; David Webster
- Production companies: Cheeky Little Media; Studio 100

Original release
- Network: ABC Kids; France 5
- Release: May 22, 2022 – present

Ginger and the Vegesaurs (also known as Vegesaurs) is an Australian children's CGI-animated television series that features fictional prehistoric creatures that are a hybrid of fruits, vegetables, and dinosaurs. Targeted at upper preschoolers, the show is produced by Cheeky Little Media in co-production with Belgian production studio Studio 100 and follows the adventures of a young Tricarrotops named Ginger and her friends, exploring themes like friendship, mealtimes, and sharing.

== Premise ==
Set in a world featuring fruit and vegetable dinosaurs in Vegesaur Valley, the series follows a young Tricarrotops named Ginger along with her Pea-Rex friends.

== Characters ==
- Ginger is a young Tricarrotops and the protagonist of the series.
- Wasabi, Minty, and Split are three Pea-Rexes who are friends with Ginger and go on adventures with her.

== Production ==
Development for Vegesaurs was announced in December 2018 during the annual Asian Animation Summit of the year, when Cheeky Little Media had announced a new 39 x 7 series entitled Vegesaurs, combining prehistoric dinosaurs with fruits & vegetables and tells the story of Ginger. While it won Best in Show, Cheeky Little Media will be producing the series as its co-founder Patrick Egerton would serve as executive producer.

Three years later in May 2021, the series had been greenlighted when the Australian Broadcasting Corporation had acquired the series to air on both its streaming platform ABC iview and ABC Kids. Three months later in October of that year, The Australian Broadcasting Corporation had officially commissioned the then-upcoming animated series with its running time reduced to 20 episodes of 5 minutes as Cheeky Little Media announcing that its production will be made with Epic's Unreal Engine pipeline, Infinite Frameworks (now Infinite Studios) handling animation services.

One month later in November also in that year, the series became an Australian/French co-production when French broadcasting network France Television had joined Vegesaurs when they acquired the upcoming television series to air on its France 5 channel, meanwhile Belgian children's entertainment company Studio 100 under its German distribution arm Studio 100 Media had also joined Vegesaurs as a co-producer and would handle worldwide distribution to the series as well as managing merchandising rights.

=== Animation ===
Animation for the series was provided by Singaporean animation production studio Infinite Studios for the first two seasons. Indian animation studio Vishus Productions had also supplied some animation with Infinite Studios for season 2 and would fully take over animation production services starting from season 3.

== Release ==
The official series had its world premiere & was released on the Australian Broadcasting Corporation's children television channel ABC Kids and its streaming platform ABC iview on May 23, 2022.

The series has been made available in over seventy territories. BBC picked up the second and third season. The series has also been available on CBeebies and BBC iPlayer.

It was announced in early 2025 that the series had been renewed for a fourth and fifth season. In April, it was announced that the series would debut in the United States on PBS stations through the distribution of American Public Television. MacMillian Children's Books owns publishing rights and has released story books for the series.

== Accolades ==
Year	Award	Category	Result	Ref.
2024	TV Week Logies	Best Children's Program	Nominated	
2025	TV Week Logies	Best Children's Program	Nominated	
2026	TV Week Logies	Best Children's Program	Nominated	
