= List of Australian film actors =

This article lists notable Australian actors.

Actors who were active in more than one era are listed only in that era in which they started their acting career.

== 1960s ==
- Jack Thompson (actor)
- John Hargreaves (actor)

== 1970s ==
- Judy Davis
- Geoffrey Rush
- David Gulpilil
- Bryan Brown

== 1980s ==
- Nicole Kidman
- Hugo Weaving
- Ben Mendelsohn
- Anthony LaPaglia
- Claudia Karvan

== 1990s ==
- Cate Blanchett
- Heath Ledger
- Eric Bana
- Joel Edgerton
- Toni Collette
- Guy Pearce
- Rose Byrne

== 2000s ==
- Sam Worthington
- Margot Robbie
- Chris Hemsworth
- Liam Hemsworth
- Mia Wasikowska
- Travis Fimmel
- Hugh Jackman

== 2010s ==
- Jacob Elordi
- Eliza Scanlen
- Yvonne Strahovski
- Luke Bracey

== 2020s ==
- Sophie Wilde
- Josh Heuston
- Thomas Weatherall

Aisha Dee

== See also ==
- List of Austrian film actors
- Cinema of Australia
- List of Australian Academy Award winners and nominees
