= George Davis (artist) =

Australian artist (1930–2024)

- Born: 1930; Hobart, Tasmania, Australia
- Died: 2024 (aged 93–94)
- Children: 4 (including Essie)

George Davis (1930 – 2024) was an Australian artist from Tasmania, known for his portraits, landscapes, and other works.

== Early life and education ==
Davis was born in Hobart, Tasmania. He studied at Hobart Technical College under artists Jack Carington Smith and Dorothy Stoner. In 1951, he received a Tasmanian Travelling Art Scholarship, allowing him to study at the Royal Academy Schools in London for three years.

== Career ==
Upon returning to Tasmania, Davis completed a public commission in 1962: a 19-meter mosaic mural for the ABC building in Hobart, using Florentine glass tiles. During this period, his works appeared in international exhibitions, such as "Recent Australian Art" at London's Whitechapel Gallery and the 2nd Paris Biennale for Young Painters.

His work often explored Tasmania's natural landscapes. A 1978 exhibition at the Tasmanian Museum and Art Gallery (TMAG) presented landscapes of remote locations such as Albatross and Macquarie Islands.

Davis was also known for his portraits. TMAG staged an exhibition of his portraits in 1988, and his subjects included Tasmanians such as former Premier Doug Lowe and botanist Winifred Curtis. In 1985, he was commissioned to paint portraits of classical composers, including Beethoven and Mozart, for Hobart’s Theatre Royal ceiling restoration. In 2014, a collection of his drawings was published alongside a retrospective exhibition.

Davis used his art to address conservation issues. One drawing depicted an oystercatcher killed in an oil slick, which he inscribed "BHP the big Australian" as an indictment of corporate pollution. In 1982, Davis and his wife, Mary Morris, were arrested while protesting the proposed damming of Tasmania’s Franklin River.

== Personal life ==
Davis was married to Mary Morris and they had four children, including Essie Davis.
