= He Went That Way =

2023 film by Jeffrey Darling

- Theatrical release poster
- Directed by: Jeffrey Darling
- Screenplay by: Evan M. Wiener
- Based on: Luke Karamazov by Conrad Hilberry
- Produced by: Marc Benardout; James Harris; Mark Lane; Hugh Broder; Jeremy Kotin
- Starring: Jacob Elordi; Zachary Quinto; Patrick J. Adams
- Cinematography: Sean Bagley
- Edited by: Adam Wills
- Music by: Jamie N Commons; Nicolas Rosen
- Production companies: Head Gear Films; Tea Shop Productions; Mister Smith Entertainment
- Distributed by: Vertical Entertainment
- Release dates: June 9, 2023 (Tribeca); January 5, 2024
- Running time: 96 minutes
- Country: United Kingdom
- Language: English
- Box office: $4,339

He Went That Way is a 2023 British crime drama film directed by Jeffrey Darling in his directorial debut, and starring Jacob Elordi and Zachary Quinto. The film is based on the actual events of the serial killer Larry Ranes encountering animal trainer Dave Pitts.

He Went That Way had its world premiere at the Tribeca Festival on June 9, 2023. The film was released by Vertical Entertainment in the United States on January 5, 2024.

== Premise ==
1964. The US is in political turmoil due to the war and serial killers are on the road. Jim Goodwin, an animal trainer accompanied by his famous pet chimpanzee, Spanky, picks up a hitchhiker named Bobby Falls at a gas station en route to Chicago. The two get to meet each other. Bobby reveals he was discharged from the Air Force and gets introduced to the chimp.

They stop at a motel in Albuquerque and, while Jim pays for a room to spend the night, Bobby steals a handgun from a parked car and points it at Jim, revealing he is a serial killer. The latter, by knowing information about him and actually being nice to him, gets spared. Although Bobby threatens to kill Spanky if he tells anything to the cops. Through flashbacks of his past killings, it's shown that Bobby had an abusive father and is triggered when he feels disrespected.

The next day they stop at Amarillo, where Jim meets his brother-in-law Saul, who owes him money, and confesses both him and Spanky are having a hard time getting job offers. Saul laughs him off and humiliates him in front of Bobby, enraged, he locks Jim in Spanky's cage and shoots Saul before driving away. Since Jim broke an earlier promise of keeping things low cover, Bobby takes charge of the ride and makes Jim swear he won't lie again.

Later that day, they change clothes to go to a Ballroom Dancing in Tulsa. Bobby seems nervous at the thought of speaking to girls, so Jim gives him confidence by bringing Spanky with them. Since the girls have a weird feeling about Bobby, Jim calms them down by claiming he's just an actor.

Jim talks to Bobby about controlling his impulses and being gentle, but Bobby takes him to the edge to win his trust by making him watch kiss the girls without consent, stealing from a shop and feeding Spanky. When they get to Chicago, Jim gets Bobby's gun off him, betraying the killer, who attempts to choke him, but runs away. Jim follows him and gifts him a Spanky flyer and Tulsa's clothes and says goodbye.

Bobby keeps on following his murder spree until he gets arrested by the Michigan police and sentenced to life in prison while Jim and Spanky's shows get back on air. After the chimp's passing, he retires and goes on to remarry and live in Argentina.

== Cast ==
- Jacob Elordi as Bobby Falls, a serial killer
- Zachary Quinto as Jim Goodwin, an animal trainer
- Patrick J. Adams as Saul
- Troy Evans as Hank
- Alexandra Doke as Whitney
- John Lee Ames as Ratso

== Production ==
He Went That Way was announced on June 2, 2021, at the virtual Marché du Film, when it was reported that Jacob Elordi and Zachary Quinto would star in the thriller based on Conrad Hilberry's non-fiction book Luke Karamazov. The film was produced by Head Gear Films, Tea Shop Productions, and Mister Smith Entertainment. It was the directorial debut of Jeffrey Darling, who died in a surfing accident in North Palm Beach in Sydney, Australia on March 27, 2022. It is based on a screenplay by Evan M. Wiener. According to executive producer Phil Hunt, the production was able to cast Quinto by going through a friend of the actor instead of his agent. Filming took place on location in Los Angeles, California.

== Release ==
The film premiered at the Tribeca Festival on June 9, 2023. In October 2023, Vertical Entertainment acquired distribution rights to the film. It was released in a limited release on January 5, 2024, prior to video on demand on January 12, 2024.

== Reception ==
On the review aggregator website Rotten Tomatoes, 25% of 32 critics' reviews are positive, with an average rating of 4.6/10. Metacritic, which uses a weighted average, assigned the film a score of 37 out of 100, based on 4 critics, indicating "generally unfavorable" reviews.

David Rooney of The Hollywood Reporter wrote that "it plays like a tonally uncertain blend of desert neo-noir, prickly buddy movie, misfit character study and crime thriller, with zero psychological grounding and even less suspense." Christian Zilko of IndieWire called the film "a competent but emotionally thin story," and gave it a grade of B−.

Patrice Witherspoon of Screen Rant described the film as "a dumpster fire from start to finish," criticizing the plot, tonal shifts, and performances, except for Quinto's performance, which she praised as the film's highlights.
