= New York Film Critics Online Award for Best Supporting Actor =

Annual award by New York Film Critics Online

The New York Film Critics Online Award for Best Supporting is an award given annually by the New York Film Critics Online. It was first introduced in 2001, to reward the best performance by a supporting actor.

== Winners ==
=== 2000s ===
Year	Winner(s)	Film	Role
2001	Steve Buscemi	Ghost World	Seymour
2002	Willem Dafoe	Spider-Man	Norman Osborn / Green Goblin
2003	Alec Baldwin	The Cooler	Shelly Kaplow
2004	Thomas Haden Church	Sideways	Jack Cole
2005	Oliver Platt	Casanova	Paprizzio
2006	Michael Sheen	The Queen	Tony Blair
2007	Javier Bardem	No Country for Old Men	Anton Chigurh
2008	Heath Ledger	The Dark Knight	The Joker
2009	Christoph Waltz	Inglourious Basterds	Hans Landa

=== 2010s ===
Year	Winner	Film	Role
2010	Christian Bale	The Fighter	Dicky Eklund
2011	Albert Brooks	Drive	Bernie Rose
2012	Tommy Lee Jones	Lincoln	Thaddeus Stevens
2013	Jared Leto	Dallas Buyers Club	Rayon
2014	J. K. Simmons	Whiplash	Terence Fletcher
2015	Mark Rylance	Bridge of Spies	Rudolf Abel
2016	Mahershala Ali	Moonlight	Juan
2017	Willem Dafoe	The Florida Project	Bobby Hicks
2018	Richard E. Grant	Can You Ever Forgive Me?	Jack Hock
2019	Joe Pesci	The Irishman	Russell Bufalino

=== 2020s ===
Year	Winner(s)	Film	Role
2020	Leslie Odom, Jr.	One Night in Miami...	Sam Cooke
2021	Kodi Smit-McPhee	The Power of the Dog	Peter Gordon
2022	Brendan Gleeson	The Banshees of Inisherin	Colm Doherty
2023	Mark Ruffalo	Poor Things	Duncan Wedderburn
2024	Guy Pearce	The Brutalist	Harrison Lee Van Buren
2025	Jacob Elordi	Frankenstein	The Creature

== Multiple winners ==
2 wins

- Willem Dafoe (2002, 2017)

== See also ==
- Los Angeles Film Critics Association Award for Best Supporting Actor
- National Board of Review Award for Best Supporting Actor
- New York Film Critics Circle Award for Best Supporting Actor
- National Society of Film Critics Award for Best Supporting Actor
