= The Narrow Road to the Deep North (miniseries) =

- Promotional poster
- Genre: Drama
- Created by: Justin Kurzel; Shaun Grant
- Based on: The Narrow Road to the Deep North by Richard Flanagan
- Written by: Shaun Grant
- Directed by: Justin Kurzel
- Starring: Jacob Elordi; Ciarán Hinds; Olivia DeJonge; Heather Mitchell; Odessa Young; Show Kasamatsu; Simon Baker; Essie Davis; Dan Wyllie
- Country of origin: Australia
- Original language: English
- No. of episodes: 5

Production
- Executive producers: Justin Kurzel; Shaun Grant; Jo Porter; Rachel Gardner; Richard Flanagan
- Producer: Alexandra Taussig
- Production companies: Curio Pictures; Screen Australia; Amazon MGM Studios

Original release
- Network: Amazon Prime Video
- Release: 18 April 2025

The Narrow Road to the Deep North is an Australian drama miniseries based on the novel of the same name by Richard Flanagan. It was written by Shaun Grant and directed by Justin Kurzel. The series stars Jacob Elordi as Dorrigo Evans, with a supporting ensemble cast including Ciarán Hinds, Olivia DeJonge, Heather Mitchell, Odessa Young, Show Kasamatsu, Simon Baker, Essie Davis, and Dan Wyllie.

The series follows Evans across three periods, from before his deployment to the Second World War, to during his time as a Far East prisoner of war, and continuing into several decades following the war. The series was released on Amazon Prime Video on 18 April 2025 and received critical acclaim and accolades including nine wins at the 15th AACTA Awards and six nominations at the Logie Awards of 2026 (including acting nominations for Baker, Elordi, Mitchell, Thomas Weatherall, and Young), with Baker winning. For his performance, Elordi also earned nominations for the Golden Globe Award and Satellite Award, winning the latter.

== Cast and characters ==
=== Main ===
- Jacob Elordi as Dorrigo Evans
  - Ciarán Hinds as Older Dorrigo Evans
- Olivia DeJonge as Ella
  - Heather Mitchell as Older Ella
- Odessa Young as Amy Mulvaney
- Show Kasamatsu as Major Nakamura
- Simon Baker as Keith Mulvaney
- Essie Davis as Lynette Maison
- Dan Wyllie as Rick Maison

=== Supporting ===
- Thomas Weatherall as Frank 'Darky' Gardiner
- William Lodder as Guy 'Rabbit' Hendricks
- Fabian McCallum as 'Sheephead' Morton
- David Howell as 'Tiny' Middleton
- Sam Parsonson as 'Rooster' MacNeice
- Taki Abe as Colonel Kota
- Charles An as The Goanna
- Akira Fujii as Kenji Mogami
- Masa Yamaguchi as Lieutenant Fukuhara
- Rupert Bevan as The Poet
- Ewen Leslie as Edward Lansbury
- George Simitzis as Australian POW
- Jack McGreal as Australian POW

== Episodes ==
No.	Title	Directed by	Written by	Original release date
1	"Episode 1"	Justin Kurzel	Shaun Grant	18 April 2025
The series follows Dorrigo Evans across three intercut timelines. In 1940, he is a young medical student in Australia who is preparing to ship out to war as a doctor. He asks his girlfriend Ella to marry him. Meanwhile, he meets his uncle Keith for the first time, and discovers he has a beautiful, much younger wife, Amy. In 1942, Dorrigo is a prisoner of war in a Japanese labor camp on the Burma Railway. In 1989, he is an old man, a renowned surgeon, and a celebrated war hero. He is interviewed by a journalist who asks him about his time in the war. He refuses to tell her about the reality of what he survived. His wife, Ella chides him. He later looks at the book he has been asked to write a forward to; sketches done in secret in the POW camp by his friend Rabbit. In 1942 Dorrigo and his men endure the brutal journey to the site of the future railway. They meet Major Nakamura who tells them it is a great honour to build the railway for the emperor. They begin the backbreaking work. In 1940, Dorrigo stays with his uncle Keith, and is entertained by Keith's young wife Amy. She asks him about his fiancee Ella. They get drunk and share an embrace.
2	"Episode 2"	Justin Kurzel	Shaun Grant	18 April 2025
In 1989 Ella and Dorrigo host a charity event. Ella suspects Dorrigo is having an affair with his co-workers Rick's wife. In 1940, Dorrigo gets drunk with his uncle Keith and Amy, and later hears them having sex. Dorrigo and Amy swim together, and grow closer. In 1989, Dorrigo takes a risk in surgery which almost goes horribly wrong. His co-worker accuses him of being a butcher. In 1942, Rabbit is sketching the terrible conditions in which the POW are living, and hiding the drawings. Dorrigo attempts to stand up to Major Nakamura when his men are too sick to work, but the Major will not listen. The POW are now mostly wearing rags and are visibly starving. The Major later asks his superior Colonel Kota for more men, and is refused. Sheephead Morton sees an opportunity to kill the Major, but is stopped by Darky who fears retribution. Tiny, who is suffering from malaria, can barely walk. Dorrigo again approaches the Major, asking for basic supplies, or a day of rest for his men. Darky is punished by a guard nicknamed 'the Goanna' for folding his blanket the wrong way. Dorrigo debrides tropical ulcers with maggots. The Colonel and the Major drink together, then the Colonel decapitates Tiny as the POW's watch, horrified. Dorrigo thinks of Amy.
3	"Episode 3"	Justin Kurzel	Shaun Grant	18 April 2025
In 1942, Dorrigo amputates Rainbow's leg using a meat saw due to spreading gangrene. He dies on the table. The men try to thank him by stealing food from the Japanese for him but Dorrigo refuses to eat it. In 1989, Dorrigo is facing a medical inquiry about the surgery. Dorrigo faces his co-worker Rick, who turned him in to the medical council. Meanwhile, Dorrigo continues his affair with Rick’s wife. Dorrigo tells her that truly great surgeons are devoid of emotion. In 1940, Dorrigo, Keith and Amy spend a day crabbing. Keith praises Amy, while Amy is visibly uncomfortable. In 1989, Dorrigo meets with a Japanese delegation who gift him with Japanese poetry books, along with a formal apology from her country. In 1942, in the POW camp, the men get weaker and sicker as Dorrigo works to keep them alive. Darky steals supplies for the sick tent. Rabbit realises he is dying and tries to finish his drawings. Dorrigo feels helpless. The Japanese Major is taking drugs to keep himself awake and ‘help inspire fighting spirits’. Dorrigo asks for morphine and is told to use what he has, which is nothing. The Major speaks of poetry and the greatness of his mission. He compares what Japan is doing now to what the British empire did in the past. When he asks Dorrigo if he has someone at home waiting for him, he thinks of Amy, not his fiancee Ella. In 1940, Dorrigo visits Amy alone, and they begin to sleep together. In 1942 Rabbit has died and Dorrigo looks through his drawings. A watercolour of a flower reminds him of Amy. Dorrigo washes Rabbit's body, then cremates his friend.
4	"Episode 4"	Justin Kurzel	Shaun Grant	18 April 2025
In 1989, Ella knows she is not the love of Dorrigo's life, despite being his wife. In 1940, Dorrigo and Amy continue their love affair. Amy admits she almost had Keith's baby, but secretly had an abortion as she wasn't sure that she loved her husband. Dorrigo reads Amy poetry. They continue to hide their affair from Keith. Dorrigo tells Amy he is about to ship out to war, she is devastated. Amy's friends gossip about another couple having an affair, and Amy tries to defend the other woman's choices. Keith grows suspicious and confronts Amy. She denies the affair. Amy calls Dorrigo and tells him Keith knows about them. She tells him to go back to Ella and that she belongs to Keith. Dorrigo and Ella spend new years together, but they argue. In 1989, Ella tells Dorrigo she knows about his affairs, and accuses him of making her a hard person. In 1942, Dorrigo receives a letter from Ella in the POW camp and saves it to read later. Darky steals a syringe for Dorrigo and apologises he couldn't get more. Major Nakamura is ill with malaria. Darky is made the work parties leader for the day. On the trek to the worksite Darky severely injures his foot. The Goanna orders him to return to the sick tent. As he slowly crawls back, he comes across Rooster and Chum who have hidden in the jungle to have a rest. Darky scolds them saying the rest of the men will suffer due to their slacking. Rooster threatens Darky. At the end of the day, the Goanna realises two men were missing from the work party, but doesn't know which two. Darky finally manages to crawl back into the camp, and Dorrigo carries him in and stitches up his foot. Darky tells Dorrigo about his desire to free the live fish in his hometown's local fish shop, saying it is unnatural keeping them in a tank only to be killed. Dorrigo promises to help him if they make it back. Outside, the rest of the men are lined up and threatened to reveal who was missing, Rooster and Chum stay silent. The Major asks for the day's leader, and Darky is taken from the sick tent. The Goanna starts to beat Darky, yelling at him to reveal who was missing. Dorrigo hears his cries and tries to defend him, only to be forced to watch with the rest of the men. The Japanese guards continue to torture Darky as the rest of the men watch and say nothing. The beating continues late into the night, eventually killing Darky. Dorrigo washes Darky's body, and as dawn breaks he opens the letter from Ella. Inside is a newspaper clipping, reporting that Keith and Amy have died in a fire.
5	"Episode 5"	Justin Kurzel	Shaun Grant	18 April 2025
In 1942, the Major asks Dorrigo to choose 100 men to march to a different work camp 100km. They both know most of them will die on the journey. Dorrigo refuses, before finally relenting and choosing the men who still have boots, as their feet will be slightly more protected. One by one they shake Dorrigo's hand and thank him, knowing they will never see him again. Dorrigo watches them leave. In 1989, Keith's wife ends their affair, saying she has seen his nightmares and cannot look after him. In 1942, the railway is complete, and the surviving POW's watch as the Colonel officially opens the line. In 1946, Dorrigo and Ella marry. Dorrigo drinks on Anzac Day with his surviving men back in Australia. They break in to Darky's local fish shop, and return the fish to the sea. Back in Singapore, the Goanna is charged with war crimes over Darky's murder and is executed. The Major and the Colonel are in hiding. The Major fears that they may have done wrong in their treatment of the POW's, but the Colonel doesn't agree. In Australia, Dorrigo returns Rabbit's drawings to his wife. They have both lost the love of their lives. In 1989, Dorrigo and Ella reflect on their life together. Dorrigo tells Ella he thought he saw Amy after the war, but that it couldn't have been her. Dorrigo gives his speech at the book launch of Rabbit's drawings. He see the faces of those who did not survive around him as he reflects on the pointlessness of it all. Afterwards, Ella admits that Amy did not die in the fire. She tried to visit Dorrigo after the war, but found Ella with their baby instead. Dorrigo drives home remembering the moment he saw Amy, now realising it was really her. His car is struck at an intersection and he lies on the road, his final vision is a return to the jungle.

== Production ==
=== Development ===
In March 2018, Fremantle acquired rights to Narrow Road to the Deep North by Richard Flanagan, to adapt into a television series. In November 2019, it was announced Justin Kurzel would direct the series, with Shaun Grant serving as writer. Fremantle later exited the project with Curio Pictures serving as producer instead.

=== Casting ===
In November 2022, Jacob Elordi joined the cast, followed by Odessa Young, Ciarán Hinds, Olivia DeJonge, Heather Mitchell, Thomas Weatherall, Show Kasamatsu, Charles An, and Simon Baker in November 2023.

=== Filming ===
Principal photography began in November 2023, and filming continued through to March 2024.

== Release ==
Amazon Prime Video distributed the series in Australia, United States, Canada, and New Zealand, with Sony Pictures Television set to distribute elsewhere internationally. On 17 January 2025, it was announced that after the first presentation at the 75th Berlin International Film Festival, the series would be released on 18 April 2025 to coincide with Easter holidays on Amazon Prime Video. The series was acquired by the BBC for broadcast on BBC One & the BBC iPlayer in United Kingdom. In Germany, Austria and German-speaking Switzerland, the series will be available in Sky, whereas HBO Max will stream the series exclusively in Central and Eastern Europe. In Latin America, the series will be available in NBCUniversal's Universal+. Other deals include RTÉ (Ireland), Movistar Plus+ (Spain), Nova (Greece), AXN (Portugal) and LG Uplus (South Korea).

== Reception ==
=== Critical response ===
The review aggregator website Rotten Tomatoes reported a 100% approval rating with an average rating of 8.3/10, based on 37 critic reviews. The website's critics consensus reads, "A difficult watch made riveting by director Justin Kurzel and star Jacob Elordi's sterling work, The Narrow Road to the Deep North chronicles the inhumanity of war with fierce intelligence." Metacritic, which uses a weighted average, assigned a score of 83 out of 100 based on 8 critics, indicating "universal acclaim " reviews.

In a review for The Guardian, Luke Buckmaster awarded the show 4 out of 5 stars, noting the strength of the performances and the complexity of the relationships depicted. He also complimented the direction, writing: "You never doubt the show’s realism, or the compassion underpinning it". Hugh Montgomery of the BBC praised the acting of Elordi and Young and described them as possessing "smouldering chemistry".

== Accolades ==
Award	Year	Category	Recipient(s) and nominee(s)	Result	Ref.
AACTA Awards	2026	Best Miniseries	Justin Kurzel, Jo Porter, Shaun Grant, Alexandra Taussig, Rachel Gardner	Nominated	
AACTA Awards	2026	Best Lead Actor in a Television Drama	Jacob Elordi	Won	
AACTA Awards	2026	Best Supporting Actress in a Television Drama	Heather Mitchell	Won	
AACTA Awards	2026	Best Casting in Television	Nikki Barrett, Kelly Graham	Nominated	
AACTA Awards	2026	Best Direction in Drama or Comedy	Justin Kurzel (for episode 1)	Won	
AACTA Awards	2026	Best Cinematography in Television	Sam Chiplin (for episode 1)	Won	
AACTA Awards	2026	Best Costume Design in Television	Alice Babidge (for episode 1)	Won	
AACTA Awards	2026	Best Editing in Television	Alexandre de Franceschi	Won	
AACTA Awards	2026	Best Production Design in Television	Bev Dunn, Alice Babidge, Paul Sarpi	Won	
AACTA Awards	2026	Best Original Score in Television	Jed Kurzel	Won	
AACTA Awards	2026	Best Sound in Television	Mick Boraso, Nick Emond, Andy Wright, Glenn Newham	Won	
AACTA Awards	2026	Best Hair and Makeup	Rachel Scane, Laurence Van Duynhoven, Angela Conte, Rachel Murphy	Won	
American Society of Cinematographers	2026	Outstanding Achievement in Cinematography in Limited or Anthology Series, or Motion Picture Made for Television	Sam Chiplin	Nominated	
Australian Screen Sound Guild	2026	Best Production Sound	Wade Keighran (additional production mixer), Nick Emond (production mixer), Aron Dyer (boom operator), Pedrag Malesev (additional production mixer), Gerry Nucifora (boom operator)	Won	
Australian Screen Sound Guild	2026	Best Sound Mixing	Andy Wright (re-recording mixer), Alexander Roberts (re-recording mix tech)	Nominated	
Australian Screen Sound Guild	2026	Best Sound for a Television Series	Dylan Burgess (foley artist), Beth Bezzina (ADR editor)Alexander Roberts (re-recording mix tech), Andy Wright (supervising sound editor/re-recording mixer), Aron Dyer (boom operator), Pedrag Malesev (additional production mixer), Will Carroll (ADR editor), Nick Emond (production mixer), Gerry Nucifora (boom operator), Owen Grieve (ADR recordist), Glenn Newnham (dialogue editor), Megan Howieson (assistant sound editor), Tara Webb (FX editor), Wade Keighran (additional production mixer), Mick Boraso (sound designer), Steve Burgess (foley recordist & editor)	Won	
Australian Writers' Guild	2026	Television – Limited Series	Shaun Grant	Nominated	
scope="row" Equity Ensemble Awards	2026	Outstanding Performance by an Ensemble in a Miniseries or Telemovie	Reagan Mannix, Essie Davis, David Howell, William Lodder, Heather Mitchell, Dan Wyllie, Sam Parsonson, Thomas Weatherall, Eduard Geyl, Christian Byers, Shô Kasamatsu, Olivia DeJonge, Odessa Young, Simon Baker, Caelan McCarthy, Fabian McCallum, Ciarán Hinds, Jacob Elordi	Nominated	
Golden Globes	2026	Best Actor in a Miniseries or Television Film	Jacob Elordi	Nominated	
Golden Trailer Awards	2025	Best Original Score – TV/Streaming Series	The Narrow Road to the Deep North	Nominated	
Guild of Music Supervisors Awards	2026	Best Music Supervision for a Trailer (Series)	Travis Barker, Kelsey Mitchell	Nominated	
Logie Awards	2026	Best Lead Actor in a Drama	Jacob Elordi	Nominated	
Logie Awards	2026	Best Lead Actress in a Drama	Odessa Young	Nominated	
Logie Awards	2026	Best Supporting Actor in a Drama	Simon Baker	Won	
Logie Awards	2026	Best Supporting Actor in a Drama	Thomas Weatherall	Nominated	
Logie Awards	2026	Best Supporting Actress in a Drama	Heather Mitchell	Nominated	
Logie Awards	2026	Best Miniseries or Telemovie	The Narrow Road to the Deep North	Nominated	
Golden Tomato Awards	2025	Best Anthology or Limited Series	The Narrow Road to the Deep North	Nominated	
Golden Tomato Awards	2025	Best Drama Series	The Narrow Road to the Deep North	Nominated	
Satellite Awards	2026	Best Miniseries and Limited Series or Motion Picture Made for Television	The Narrow Road to the Deep North	Nominated	
Satellite Awards	2026	Best Actor in a Miniseries, Limited Series or Motion Picture Made for Television	Jacob Elordi	Won	
Septimius Awards	2025	Best Oceanian Actor	Jacob Elordi	Nominated	
Shanghai International TV Festival	2026	Best Foreign TV Film/Miniseries	The Narrow Road to the Deep North	Nominated	
