= Essie Davis =

Australian actress (born 1970)

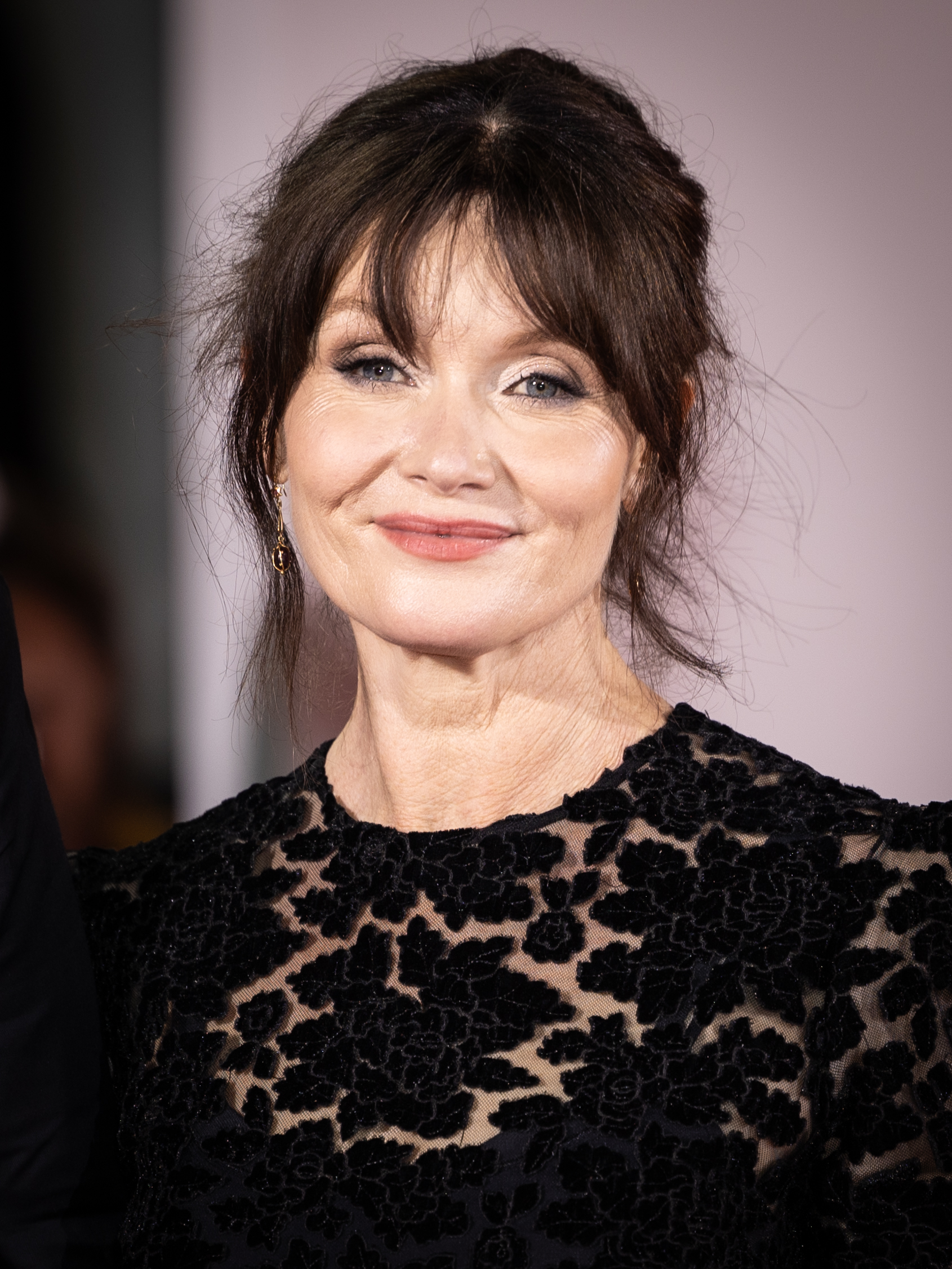
- Davis in 2024
- Born: Esther Davis; 19 January 1970 (age 56); Hobart, Tasmania, Australia
- Education: National Institute of Dramatic Art (BFA)
- Occupation: Actress
- Years active: 1992–present
- Spouse: Justin Kurzel (m. 2002)
- Children: 2

Esther Davis (born 19 January 1970) is an Australian actress, best known for her roles as Phryne Fisher in Miss Fisher's Murder Mysteries and its film continuation, Miss Fisher & the Crypt of Tears, and as Amelia Vanek in The Babadook. Other major works include a recurring role as Lady Crane in season six of the television series Game of Thrones, Sister Iphigenia in Lambs of God, and the role of Ellen Kelly in Justin Kurzel's True History of the Kelly Gang.

== Early life and education ==
Davis was born in Hobart, Tasmania, to artist George Davis and Mary Davis, the youngest of seven children. She was raised in suburban Hobart, where her family (who were part of the inception of the Australian Green movement) grew and raised their own food including turkeys.

As a child, Davis was involved in community theatre, making her stage debut at age five at Hobart's Theatre Royal, playing the part of a moonbeam.

She was educated at Clarence High School; Rosny College; the University of Tasmania, where she was a member of the Old Nick Company; and the National Institute of Dramatic Art (NIDA) in Sydney.

== Career ==
Her acting career began with the Bell Shakespeare company when, straight out of NIDA, she was cast as Juliet in its 1993 production of Romeo and Juliet. She followed this with performances for the company in Hamlet and Richard III in 1993, and Macbeth and The Taming of the Shrew in 1994.

Davis's film career started with her role in the 1995 Australian film Dad and Dave: On Our Selection, which starred Geoffrey Rush, Leo McKern and Joan Sutherland. Film roles continued in The Matrix Reloaded and The Matrix Revolutions, director Richard Flanagan's 1998 Tasmanian film The Sound of One Hand Clapping, and Girl with a Pearl Earring.

After further stage performances in Australia, including Gwendolen Fairfax in a national tour of The Importance of Being Earnest in 2000 and The School for Scandal for the Sydney Theatre Company in 2001, in 2003 she won the Laurence Olivier Award for Best Supporting Actress for her performance as Stella Kowalski opposite Glenn Close in Trevor Nunn's production of Tennessee Williams play A Streetcar Named Desire at the National Theatre in London. In 2004 she starred in a Broadway production of Tom Stoppard's Jumpers at the Brooks Atkinson Theatre, for which she earned a Tony Award nomination. In 2005 she appeared as Mrs. Nellie Lovett in the BBC production of Sweeney Todd with Ray Winstone.

In the 2008 film, Hey, Hey, It's Esther Blueburger she plays Esther's controlling mother. Also in 2008, she appeared in the film Australia with Nicole Kidman and Hugh Jackman, directed by Baz Luhrmann. The same year, Davis played Maggie in Cat on a Hot Tin Roof for the Melbourne Theatre Company.

Davis returned to Tasmania to launch the Tasmanian Theatre Company in 2008 and help support local theatre while encouraging youth to continue participating in the arts. In 2011, she received a Logie Award nomination for her role as Anouk in the Australian miniseries The Slap. In 2012, 2013 and 2015, Davis played Phryne Fisher, the central character in ABC Television's high-rating costume drama Miss Fisher's Murder Mysteries.

Davis starred in Jennifer Kent's 2014 debut feature The Babadook. For her work in the film Davis was nominated for an AACTA Award for Best Actress in a Leading Role, an AACTA International Award for Best Actress and a Fangoria Chainsaw Award for Best Leading Actress.

In 2016, she joined the HBO series Game of Thrones in Season 6 as actress Lady Crane; this role did not continue into Season 7. In June 2016 she started filming The White Princess, playing Dowager Queen Elizabeth (Elizabeth Woodville). In early January 2017, the producers released a video clip from the series as a brief trailer (teaser).

In 2018, Davis filmed the mini-series Lambs of God for Foxtel, playing the role of Sister Iphigenia. It was released July 2019 in Australia and has been sold to 46 other territories. For her performance as Sister Iphigenia, Davis has been nominated for an AACTA Award for Best Lead Actress in a Drama Series.

Later the same year, Davis played Ellen Kelly in Justin Kurzel's True History of the Kelly Gang. The film premiered at the Toronto International Film Festival 11 September 2019 and was released in Australian cinemas in 2020 by Transmission Films.

Also in 2018, Davis reprised her role of Phryne Fisher from the popular television series Miss Fisher's Murder Mysteries with a stand-alone action-adventure feature film, Miss Fisher and the Crypt of Tears With an AU$8m production budget, it wrapped production in late November 2018 and was released in cinemas in 2020.

In early 2019, Davis filmed the comedy-drama Babyteeth, playing the role of Anna. The film was selected to compete for the Golden Lion at the 76th Venice International Film Festival, where it had its world premiere on 4 September 2019.

In 2020, Davis finished filming The Justice of Bunny King, playing the title role. The film, co-starring Thomasin McKenzie, was shot in New Zealand.

== Personal life ==
Davis met future husband, film director Justin Kurzel while performing as Catherine in Belvoir Street Theatre’s production of A View from the Bridge in 1996. He was the costume and set designer for the play. They married in 2002 and have twin daughters together. The couple have collaborated both on screen and stage on numerous occasions.

== Filmography ==
=== Film ===
Year	Title	Role	Notes
1993	The Custodian	Jilly	Feature film
1995	Dad and Dave: On Our Selection	Kate Rudd	Feature film
1996	Lilian's Story	Zara	Feature film
1996	River Street	Wendy Davis	Feature film
1997	Blackrock	Detective Gilhooley	Feature film
1997	The Two-Wheeled Time Machine	Young Alice	Short film
1997	The Ripper	Evelyn Bookman	TV film
1998	The Sound of One Hand Clapping	Jean	
2003	The Matrix Reloaded	Maggie	Feature film
2003	The Pact	Helene Davis	Feature film
2003	Girl with a Pearl Earring	Catharina Vermeer	Feature film
2003	Code 46	Doctor	
2003	The Matrix Revolutions	Maggie	Feature film
2003	After the Deluge	Beth	TV film
2003	Temptation	Julie	TV film
2005	Isolation	Orla	
2006	Charlotte's Web	Mrs. Phyllis Arable	Feature film
2006	Sweeney Todd	Mrs. Lovett	TV film
2006	The Silence	Juliet Moore	TV film
2008	Hey, Hey, It's Esther Blueburger	Grace Blueburger	Feature film
2008	Australia	Catherine "Cath" Carney Fletcher	Feature film
2010	South Solitary	Alma Stanley	
2010	The Wedding Party	Jane	
2010	Legend of the Guardians: The Owls of Ga'Hoole	Marella (voice)	Animated feature film
2011	The Last Time I Saw Michael Gregg	Lottie	Video
2011	Burning Man	Karen	
2014	A Poet in New York	Caitlin Thomas	TV film
2014	The Babadook	Amelia Vanek	Feature film
2016	Assassin's Creed	Mary Lynch	Feature film
2017	Mindhorn	Patricia Deville	
2019	Babyteeth	Anna Finlay	Feature film
2019	True History of the Kelly Gang	Ellen Kelly	
2020	Miss Fisher & the Crypt of Tears	Phryne Fisher	TV film
2021	The Justice of Bunny King	Bunny King	
2021	Nitram	Helen	Feature film

=== Television ===
Year	Title	Role	Notes
1997	Water Rats	Senior Detective Nicola Bourke	TV series, 2 episodes: "Blood Trail", "Dead or Alive"
1998	Kings in Grass Castles	Mary Costello	TV miniseries
1998	Murder Call	Judy St. John	TV series, season 2, episode 9: "Deadfall"
2000	Halifax f.p.	Alison Blount	TV series, episode: "The Spider and the Fly"
2001	Corridors of Power	Sophie	TV series, season 1, episode 4
2002	Young Lions	Julie Morgan	TV series, season 1, episode 2: "Mardi Gras"
2003	Enter the Matrix	Maggie (voice)	Video game
2011	Cloudstreet	Dolly Pickles	TV miniseries
2011	The Slap	Anouk	TV series
2012–2015	Miss Fisher's Murder Mysteries	Phryne Fisher	TV series
2014	Funny or Die Presents	Amelia	TV series, episode: "The Babadooks of Hazzard"
2016	Game of Thrones	Lady Crane	TV series, 3 episodes: "The Door" "Blood of My Blood" "No One"
2017	The White Princess	Elizabeth Woodville	TV series
2017	Philip K. Dick's Electric Dreams	Vera	TV series, episode: "Human Is"
2017	The Last Post	Martha Franklin	TV series
2019	Lambs of God	Sister Iphigenia	TV series
2022	Guillermo del Toro's Cabinet of Curiosities	Nancy Bradley	TV series, episode: "The Murmuring"
2024	One Day	Alison Mayhew, Dexter's Mum	Netflix series, 4 episodes
2025	Apple Cider Vinegar	Natalie Dal-Bello	3 episodes
2025	The Narrow Road to the Deep North	Lynette Maison	3 episodes
2025	Alien: Earth	Dame Sylvia	7 episodes

== Theatre ==
Year	Title	Role	Notes
1992	The Heiress	Lavinia Penniman	NIDA Parade Studio, Sydney
1992	Electra	Clytemnestra	NIDA Parade Theatre, Sydney
1992	Crimes of the Heart	Babe Botrelle	NIDA Parade Theatre, Sydney
1992	As You Like It	Attendant	NIDA Parade Theatre, Sydney
1992	Images de Moliere		NIDA Parade Theatre, Sydney
1993	Romeo and Juliet	Juliet	Theatre Royal Sydney, Melbourne Athenaeum, Her Majesty's Theatre, Adelaide, Canberra Theatre with Bell Shakespeare
1993	Hamlet	Player Queen / Court Lady	Theatre Royal Sydney, Melbourne Athenaeum, Her Majesty's Theatre, Adelaide, Canberra Theatre with Bell Shakespeare
1993	Richard III	Jane Shore / Citizen	Theatre Royal Sydney, Melbourne Athenaeum, Her Majesty's Theatre, Adelaide, Canberra Theatre with Bell Shakespeare
1994	The Taming of the Shrew	Katherina	Newcastle Civic Theatre, Comedy Theatre, Melbourne, University of Sydney, Canberra Theatre, Regal Theatre, Perth, Theatre Royal, Hobart, Princess Theatre, Launceston with Bell Shakespeare
1994	Macbeth	Second Witch / Gentlewoman	Newcastle Civic Theatre, Comedy Theatre, Melbourne, University of Sydney, Canberra Theatre, Regal Theatre, Perth, Theatre Royal, Hobart, Princess Theatre, Launceston with Bell Shakespeare
1996	A View from the Bridge	Catherine	Belvoir Street Theatre, Sydney
1996	Night on Bald Mountain	Stella Summerhayes	Playhouse, Adelaide, Belvoir Street Theatre, Sydney with STCSA
1998	Macbeth	Lady Macbeth	Space Theatre, Adelaide with STCSA
1998	The Idiot	Aglaya	Space Theatre, Adelaide with STCSA
1999	Twelfth Night	Viola	Playhouse, Adelaide with STCSA
1999	The Rose Tattoo	Rosa	Opera Playhouse, Adelaide with STCSA
2000–2001	The Importance of Being Earnest	Hon. Gwendolen Fairfax	Regal Theatre, Perth, Princess Theatre, Melbourne, Civic Theatre, Auckland, Theatre Royal Sydney, Manchester, Theatre Royal, Bath, Savoy Theatre, London
2001	The School for Scandal	Lady Teazle	Sydney Opera House with STC
2002	A Streetcar Named Desire	Stella Kowalski	Royal National Theatre, London
	The Cripple of Inishmaan	Helen	STC
2003–2004	Jumpers	Dorothy Moore	Lyttelton National Theatre, London, Piccadilly Theatre, London, Brooks Atkinson Theatre, New York
2008	Cat on a Hot Tin Roof	Margaret	Playhouse, Melbourne with MTC
2009	Tot Mom	Nancy Grace	Wharf Theatre, Sydney with STC
2021	The Maids	Claire	Playhouse Theatre, Hobart with Archipelago Productions

== Awards and nominations ==
=== Film and television ===
Year	Ceremony	Category	Work	Result
1995	Australian Film Institute Awards	Best Actress in a Supporting Role	Dad and Dave: On Our Selection	Nominated
2000	Australian Film Institute Awards	Best Actress in a Telefeature or Mini-Series	Halifax f.p.: The Spider and The Fly	Nominated
2003	Australian Film Institute Awards	Best Actress in a Supporting or Guest Role in a Television Drama or Comedy	After the Deluge	Won
2006	Screamfest Horror Film Festival	Festival Trophy	Isolation	Won
2011	Film Critics Circle of Australia	Best Supporting Actor- Female	South Solitary	Won
2012	AACTA Awards	Best Lead Actress in a Television Drama	Cloudstreet	Nominated
2012	ASTRA Awards	Most Outstanding Performance by an Actor – Female	Cloudstreet	Nominated
2012	Logie Awards	Most Outstanding Actress	The Slap	Nominated
2012	Film Critics Circle of Australia	Best Actress – Supporting Role	Burning Man	Nominated
2013	AACTA Awards	Best Supporting Actress	Burning Man	Nominated
2013	AACTA Awards	Best Lead Actress in a Television Drama	Miss Fisher's Murder Mysteries	Nominated
2014	Logie Awards	Most Popular Actress	Miss Fisher's Murder Mysteries	Nominated
2014	Puchon International Fantastic Film Festival	Best Actress	The Babadook	Won
2014	Sitges Film Festival	Best Actress	The Babadook	Won
2014	Toronto After Dark Film Festival	Best Actress	The Babadook	Won
2014	AACTA Awards	Best Lead Actress	The Babadook	Nominated
2014	Detroit Film Critics Society	Best Actress	The Babadook	Nominated
2014	Houston Film Critics Society	Best Actress	The Babadook	Nominated
2014	Online Film Critics Society	Best Actress	The Babadook	Nominated
2014	San Francisco Film Critics Circle	Best Actress	The Babadook	Nominated
2014	Alliance of Women Film Journalists	Best Breakthrough Performance	The Babadook	Nominated
2014	Village Voice Film Poll	Best Actress	The Babadook	3rd place
2015	Saturn Awards	Best Actress	The Babadook	Nominated
2015	Empire Awards	Best Newcomer- Female	The Babadook	Nominated
2015	Fangoria Chainsaw Awards	Best Leading Actress	The Babadook	Won
2015	AACTA International Awards	Best Actress	The Babadook	Nominated
2015	Dorian Awards	Film Performance of The Year – Female	The Babadook	Nominated
2016	Logie Awards	Gold Logie	Miss Fisher's Murder Mysteries	Nominated
2016	Logie Awards	Best Actress	Miss Fisher's Murder Mysteries	Nominated
2016	Logie Awards	Most Outstanding Actress	Miss Fisher's Murder Mysteries	Nominated
2019	AACTA Awards	Best Lead Actress in a Television Drama	Lambs of God	Nominated
2020	Film Club's The Lost Weekend	Best Supporting Actress	Babyteeth	Won
2020	AACTA Awards	Best Supporting Actress	Babyteeth	Won
2021	AACTA Awards	Best Supporting Actress	Nitram	Won

=== Stage ===
Year	Ceremony	Category	Title	Work
1993	Sydney Theatre Critics Awards	Best Newcomer	Romeo and Juliet	Nominated
2002	Helpmann Awards	Best Female Actor in a Play	The School for Scandal	Nominated
2003	Olivier Awards	Best Performance in a Supporting Role	A Streetcar Named Desire	Won
2004	Tony Award	Best Featured Actress in a Play	Jumpers	Nominated
