= The Narrow Road to the Deep North (novel) =

2013 novel by Australian author Richard Flanagan

- Author: Richard Flanagan
- Language: English
- Genre: Fiction novel
- Published: 23 September 2013
- Publisher: Knopf
- Publication place: Australia
- Media type: Print, e-book
- Pages: 352 pp. (hardcover edition)
- Awards: 2014 Booker Prize
- ISBN: 978-1741666700
- OCLC: 864700580

The Narrow Road to the Deep North is the sixth novel by Australian author Richard Flanagan. It tells the story of a doctor haunted by memories of a love affair with his uncle's wife and of his subsequent experiences as a Far East prisoner of war during the construction of the Burma Railway. Decades later, he grapples to resolve his rising celebrity in the face of his feelings of failure and guilt.

The novel was critically acclaimed and won the 2014 Man Booker Prize.

== Plot summary ==
Dorrigo Evans has found fame and public recognition as a war veteran in old age, but inwardly he is plagued by his own shortcomings and considers his numerous accolades to be a “failure of perception on the part of others”. He knows that his colleagues consider him a reckless and dangerous surgeon, and he has habitually cheated on his faithful and adoring wife, though his public reputation has been undented by the air of scandal that trails him in his private life.

Flashbacks describe Dorrigo’s early life in rural Tasmania, and his love affair with Amy Mulvaney, the young wife of his uncle and the love of his life. Dorrigo meets Amy by chance in an Adelaide bookstore and he finds that "her body was a poem beyond memorising". Dorrigo is at first unaware that Amy is married to his uncle. Despite this fact, Dorrigo felt the affair was justified because "the war pressed, the war deranged, the war undid, the war excused". In a metaphor for the novel's theme of fatalism, Amy observes, while swimming, a group of fish trying "to escape the breaking wave’s hold. And all the time the wave had them in its power and would take them where it would, and there was nothing that the glistening chain of fish could do to change their fate." Dorrigo and Amy feel that their love places them outside of time as Amy at another point says: "You hear that? She said. The waves, the clock...Sea time, she said as another wave crashed. Man time, she said, as the clock ticked. We run on sea time." Despite the end of the affair, Evans finds himself unable to forget Amy for the rest of his life and the memory of her keeps recurring.

After the end of the affair, he joins the Australian Imperial Force. His regiment is captured during the Battle of Java and is sent to labour on the notorious Burma Death Railway, intended to provide the necessary means of bringing supplies from Thailand to Burma for an invasion of India. One out of every three workers engaged on the Burma Death Railway died during its construction between October 1942-October 1943. Under the fierce code of bushido ("the way of the warrior") that served as Imperial Japan's ideology, the only honorable options for a soldier was to win, die trying or to commit suicide in the face of defeat. Under bushido, any soldier who surrendered lost his honour and ceased to be a human being. Much of the brutality the Japanese displayed towards POWs was due to their beliefs based in bushido that by surrendering Allied POWs had become a sort of animal unworthy of respect and compassion. During the construction of the railway, Evans is reluctantly bestowed the leadership over his fellow prisoners and fights a losing battle to protect his charges against disease, malnutrition and the violence of their captors. Dorrigo sadly observes as the bodies of his fellow POWs break down and disintegrate with "eyes that already seemed to be little more than black-shadowed sockets waiting for worms". Evans finds himself sustained only by the memory of Amy and finds himself losing his spirit when he receives news of her death. As one reviewer noted, the memories of Amy are "worn like armour" to protect him from the degradation and horror of the Burma Death Railway. The camp's commander, Major Nakamura, a methamphetamine addict who pushes his prisoners harder and harder out of the fear of failing the Emperor, is in his own way just as much a prisoner of the railway project as the men he brutalises.

A major theme of the novel concerns the Australian value of "mateship"—a sense of camaraderie and loyalty—or the absence of "mateship" on the Burma Death Railway. Among the POWs is the energetic and hardworking Tiny Middleton, who wants "to show them little yellow bastards what a white man is" by overfilling his work quotas, thereby inspiring the Japanese to set higher work quotas that lead to the deaths of the weaker POWs. Other POWs include the artistic Rabbit Hendricks who secretly makes drawings of camp life (which could lead to his execution if the drawings are discovered), the white supremacist Rooster MacNeice who has trouble accepting that he is now a prisoner of the Japanese, and the defiant Darky Gardiner who is repeatedly beaten by the guards and finally drowns in a latrine full of excrement after the beating.

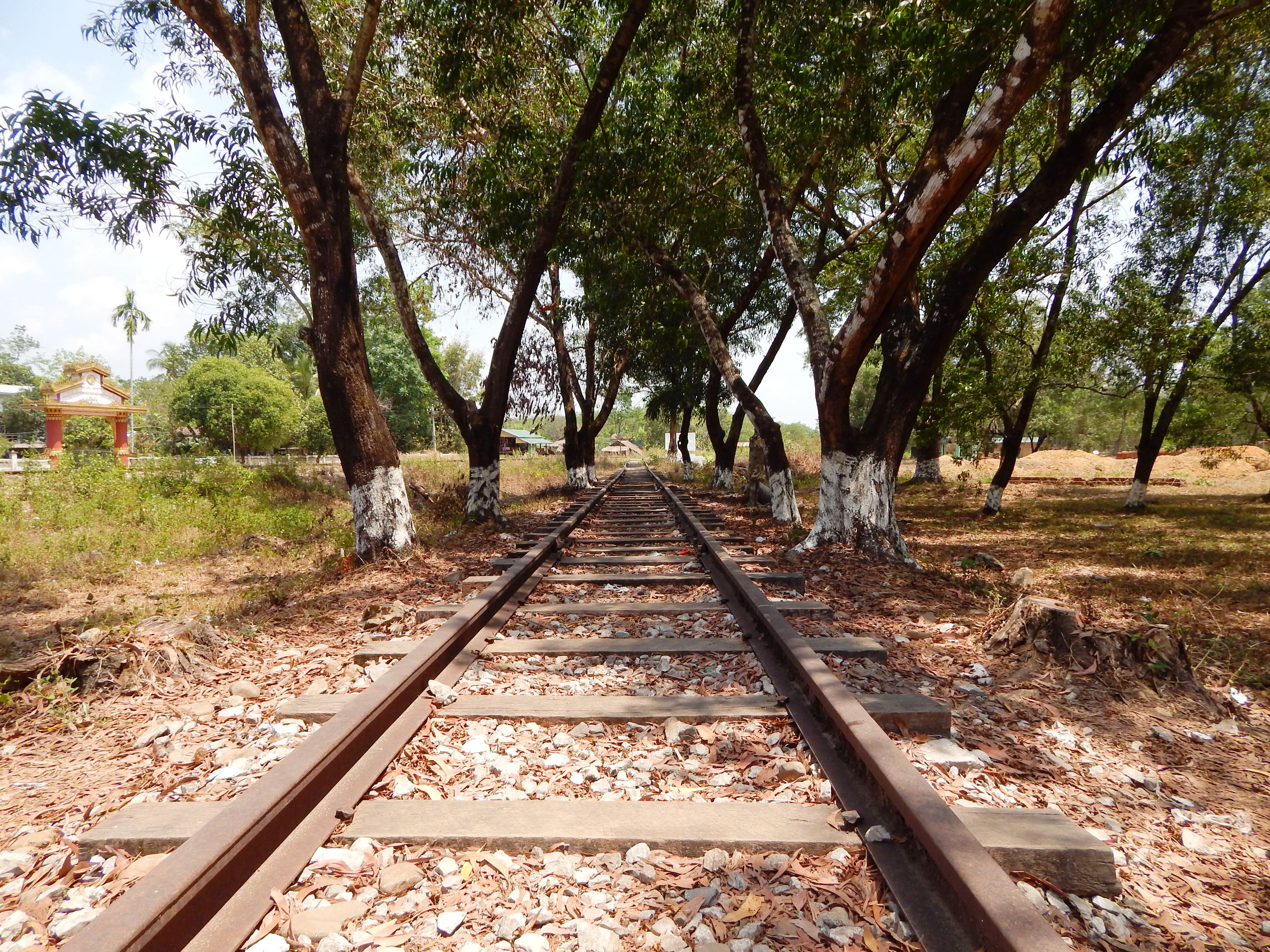
The Burma Death Railway today in Thanbyuzayat, Myanmar.

After the war, the fates of the prisoners and captors are shown. The "Goanna", a Korean man renowned for his brutality in the prison camp who was himself forced into the Japanese army, is hanged for his crimes. His superior officer, Major Nakamura, returns to Tokyo and avoids capture as a war criminal by hiding among the ruins of Shinjuku. After a conversation with a Japanese doctor who served with Unit 731 in Manchukuo reveals to him the country’s human experimentation programme during the war, he gradually absolves himself of any sense of guilt for his actions. Other Australian soldiers imprisoned with Dorrigo live through the trauma of their experience as prisoners. Dorrigo’s own acts of heroism, and the reverence of his fellow soldiers, fail to assuage his sense of shame and self-loathing. Dorrigo comes to "feel the more people I am with...the more alone I feel". Evans reflects after the war: “There were only two sorts of men, the men who were on the Line, and the rest of humanity, who were not." After the war, Evans sees Amy on a street in Sydney and asumes that she has forgotten him and married somebody else as she passes with two children, so he does not approach her. Unbeknownst to him, the children were her nieces, and she is a widow dying of cancer, while in care of her sister.

== Background ==
Flanagan wrote that his father's experience as a Japanese prisoner of war influenced him to write the book. The character of Evans was also partially based on the Australian hero Edward "Weary" Dunlop, an Australian Army doctor who struggled despite overwhelming odds to care for the men who suffered and died during the construction of the Burma Death Railroad. Like Dorrigo, Dunlop bargained with the Japanese officers in attempts to improve conditions for the "living skeletons" that were his fellow POWs. And like Dorrigo, Dunlop found that many of the Japanese and Korean guards were sadists who thoroughly enjoyed inflicting misery on others.

== Title ==
The title is taken from a classic early 18th-century poetic travel diary Oku no Hosomichi, by the Japanese poet Matsuo Bashō.

== Reception ==
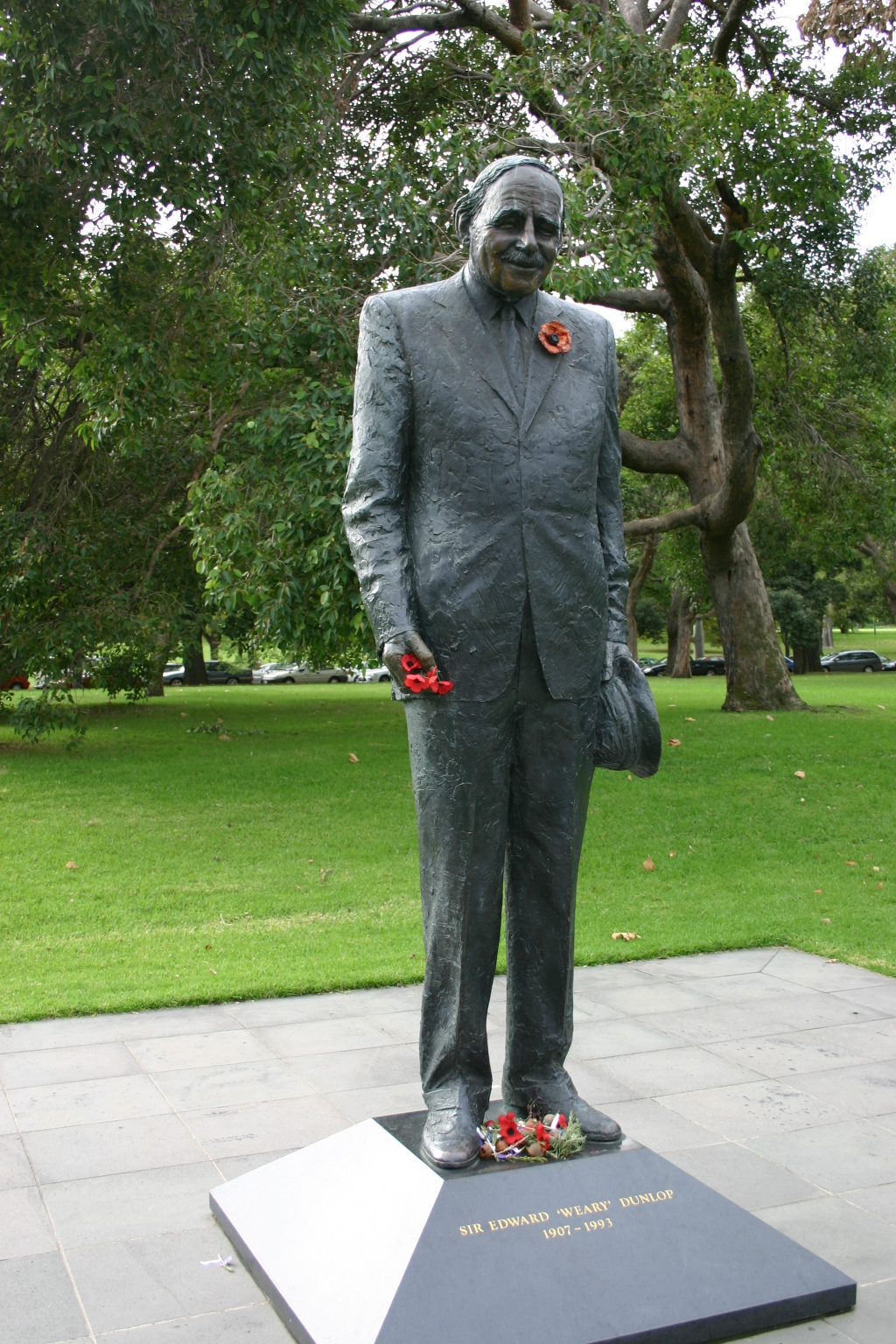
A bronze statue of Edward Dunlop, situated in the Domain Parklands, Melbourne. The character of Dorrigo Evans is partially based on Dunlop.

The novel was critically acclaimed both in Australia and internationally on its release, with Man Booker judge chair AC Grayling praising it as a "remarkable love story as well as a story about human suffering and comradeship". It was shortlisted for the 2014 Miles Franklin Award.

The Australian critic Daniel Herborn praised the book, writing: "A story that is both harrowing and deeply humanist, The Narrow Road to the Deep North has been billed as Flanagan's most personal work, inspired by his father's stories of his POW experience. It is also perhaps his most ambitious, a deeply felt attempt to come to terms with the almost unimaginable horror of the Death Railway." The Australian critic Roger Pulvers felt that the novel was well written, but that the novel's Australian characters were better drawn than the Japanese characters, noting what the novel presents as a peculiar "dichotomy" of the Japanese between a delicate, graceful and poetical sensibility vs. a tendency to engage in outrageously savage cruelty that is almost incomprehensible could be just as easily said of other peoples such as the Americans and the Germans as well. The Australian novelist Thomas Keneally wrote the book was "..a grand examination of what it is to be a good man and a bad man in the one flesh and, above all, of how hard it is to live after survival". The British television producer Francesca De Onis in a review stated that The Narrow Road to the Deep North was well written, but very similar to Flanagan's previous novels set in 19th century Tasmania, when it served as one of the harshest penal colonies in the British empire. De Onis wrote that scenes with Dorrigo and Amy were "...gorgeous, as erotically charged as the prisoner of war scenes are brutal."

Writing in Literary Review, A. S. H. Smyth praised Flanagan for his "poet's appreciation of unsentimental detail", which serves less to embellish memory than to clarify it, bestowing "the quiet blessing of veracity on episodes perhaps otherwise too outlandish or too harrowing to be thought real."

== Miniseries ==
in November 2023, it was announced that Jacob Elordi would play the male lead of a miniseries adaptation of the novel by Prime Video Australia, along with Ciarán Hinds, Odessa Young, Thomas Weatherall, Olivia DeJonge, and Simon Baker.

== Books ==
- Quinones, Kenneth (2021). Imperial Japan's Allied Prisoners of War in the South Pacific Surviving Paradise. Newcastle upon Tyne: Cambridge Scholars Publishing. ISBN 9781527575462.
