= Jacob Elordi =

Australian actor (born 1997)

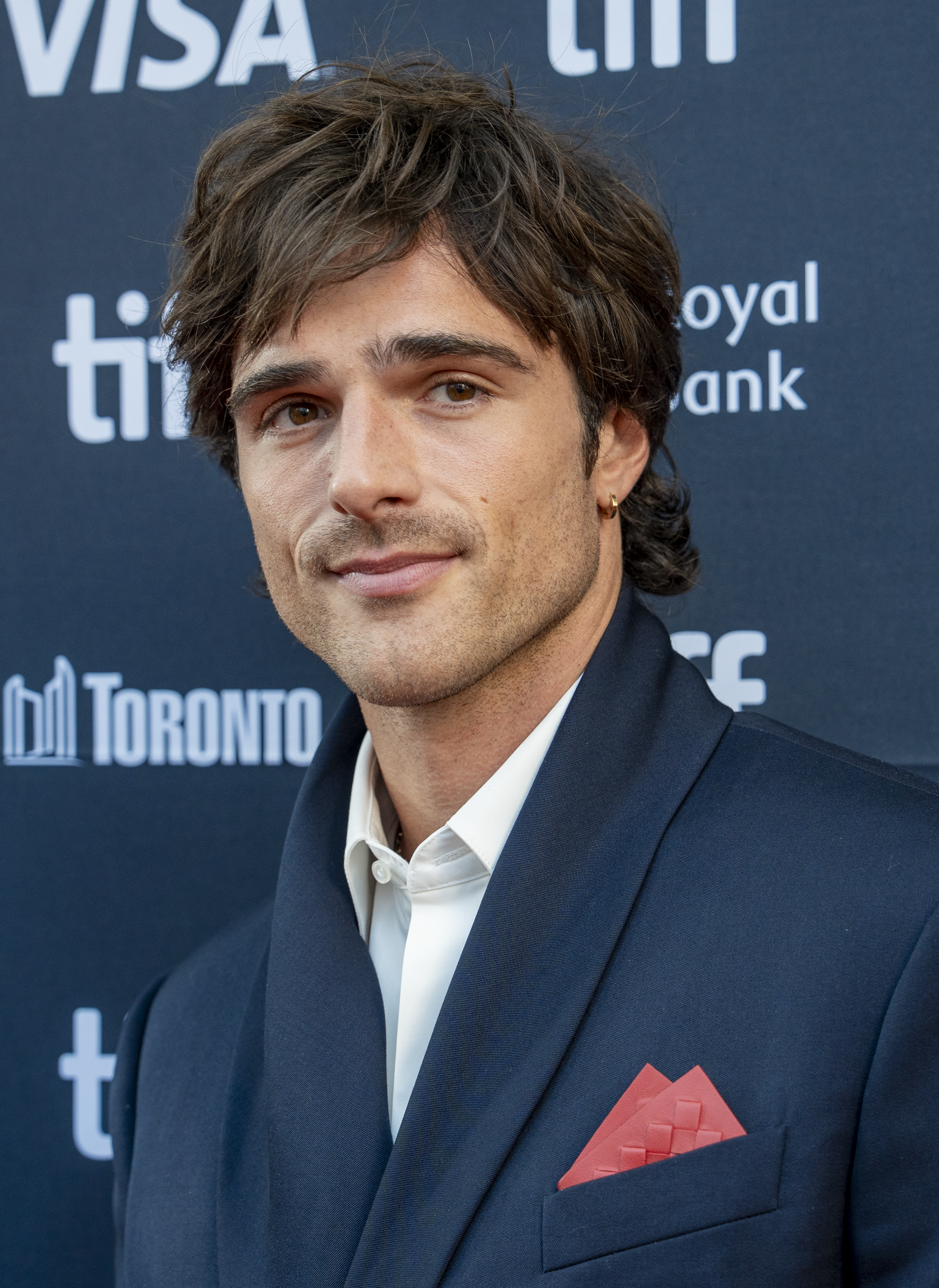
- Elordi in 2025
- Born: Jacob Nathaniel Elordi; 26 June 1997 (age 29); Brisbane, Queensland, Australia
- Occupation: Actor
- Years active: 2017–present
- Awards: Full list

Jacob Nathaniel Elordi (born 26 June 1997) is an Australian actor. His accolades include a Critics' Choice Award and three AACTA Awards, in addition to nominations for an Academy Award, three British Academy Film Awards and two Golden Globe Awards.

He became known for his role as Noah Flynn in Netflix's The Kissing Booth franchise (2018–2021) and as Nate Jacobs in the HBO drama series Euphoria (2019–2026). Elordi gained further recognition for his performance in Emerald Fennell's Saltburn (2023), and for his portrayal of the Creature in Guillermo del Toro's Frankenstein (2025), which earned him a nomination for the Academy Award for Best Supporting Actor. His other credits include the films Priscilla (2023), Wuthering Heights (2026) and The Dog Stars (2026), and the miniseries The Narrow Road to the Deep North (2025)

== Early life and education ==
Jacob Nathaniel Elordi was born on 26 June 1997 in Brisbane, Queensland, to Melissa Elordi (née Neilsen), a stay-at-home mother and school volunteer, and John Elordi, a house painter. Elordi's father was born in Markina-Xemein, a town in the Biscay province of Basque Country, Spain; he migrated to Australia from Bilbao when he was eight years old to escape the Francoist dictatorship. Elordi's paternal grandfather, Joaquín Elordi, was from Ondarroa. Elordi has three older sisters, and grew up in a working class household.

Elordi spent the first 12 years of his life in Brisbane, before moving to Melbourne in 2010 for four years while his sister attended the Australian Ballet School. He returned to his hometown of Brisbane in 2013 when he was 16 years old to finish high school. Whilst growing up, he was a talented junior athlete, representing Victoria in both rugby union and basketball, and was a member of the under-16 national championship winning Victorian basketball team in 2012. While a player on his school's rugby team, Elordi performed in school musicals starting at age 12, starring in productions of Seussical and Charlie and the Chocolate Factory, and he soon began taking acting classes. He was first inspired to become an actor by Heath Ledger, particularly because of his role as the Joker in the 2008 film The Dark Knight. He also played Oberon in a production of A Midsummer Night's Dream. At age 14, Elordi started practicing his American accent, modelling it after that of Vin Diesel. He also attempted modelling at his mother's suggestion at age 15, but was told he was too tall to fit into the sample clothes.

Elordi attended the private all-boys Roman Catholic secondary schools of St Kevin's College, Melbourne, and St Joseph's College, Nudgee, graduating from the latter in 2015.

Throughout secondary school, Elordi continued to play rugby until he injured his back during a match, which led him away from athletics and toward acting. He has stated that, after reading Waiting for Godot in a drama class at age 15, acting "became [his] church" and his personality changed as a result. His mother also encouraged him to pursue acting. He was inspired by actors such as Marlon Brando, Laurence Olivier, Daniel Day-Lewis, Christian Bale, and Heath Ledger, and would read their biographies while he emulated their behaviours. He later attended an acting school in Melbourne for one year, and moved to the United States in 2017 at age 19 to pursue a career in acting.

== Career ==
=== 2017–2022: Early work and breakthrough ===
Elordi's first experience on a Hollywood film set was in 2017's Pirates of the Caribbean: Dead Men Tell No Tales as an extra, reportedly as one of the redcoats. His first acting role was on the Australian film Swinging Safari in 2018, playing the role of Rooster.

Elordi co-starred opposite Joey King in the Netflix romantic comedy film The Kissing Booth, which premiered in May 2018, as Noah Flynn, a "bad-boy jock" and the film's primary love interest. Despite largely negative critical reception, the film became one of Netflix's most-watched titles in 2018 and brought Elordi widespread fame. Elordi reprised the role in the sequels The Kissing Booth 2, which filmed in mid-2019 in Cape Town, South Africa, and was released in July 2020; and The Kissing Booth 3, which was released on Netflix in August 2021. In a 2023 interview for GQ, he stated that he had not wanted to make them, calling them "ridiculous" and stating that he did them to "do whatever the fuck [he had] to do" to become an actor in the United States. He also spoke out against his objectification as a result of the films.

After filming was completed for the first Kissing Booth film, Elordi moved to Los Angeles. He helped a friend to film an audition for a role in Sam Levinson's HBO drama series Euphoria, a remake of the Israeli series of the same name. While occasionally sleeping in his car and couch surfing at friends' houses with little money left and his visa expiring soon, he auditioned for Euphoria himself, with plans for it to be his last audition before moving back home. He was then selected to play Nate Jacobs, a troubled high school football player with an abusive father, whom he portrayed from the show's pilot episode in 2019. Elordi described the character as "a narcissist" and "a sociopath", while Clay Skipper of British GQ referred to the character as an antihero. The role was described by Maanya Sachdeva of The Guardian as an "impressive career pivot" for Elordi and Samantha Bergeson of IndieWire called it his breakout role.

During this time Elordi also appeared in the 2019 horror anthology film The Mortuary Collection. Elordi then starred in Lance Hool's 2020 romantic drama film 2 Hearts as Chris Gregory, a college student and the film's narrator. Entertainment Weekly's Maureen Lee Lenker wrote that his performance in the film was "ham-fistedly goofy" while Owen Gleiberman of Variety opined that Elordi was "done no favors by being in" 2 Hearts. He appeared later that year as the son of the title character in the Australian comedy film The Very Excellent Mr. Dundee. In 2022, he appeared as Charlie, a piano teacher, in Adrian Lyne's erotic thriller Deep Water.

=== 2023–present: Critical acclaim and rise ===
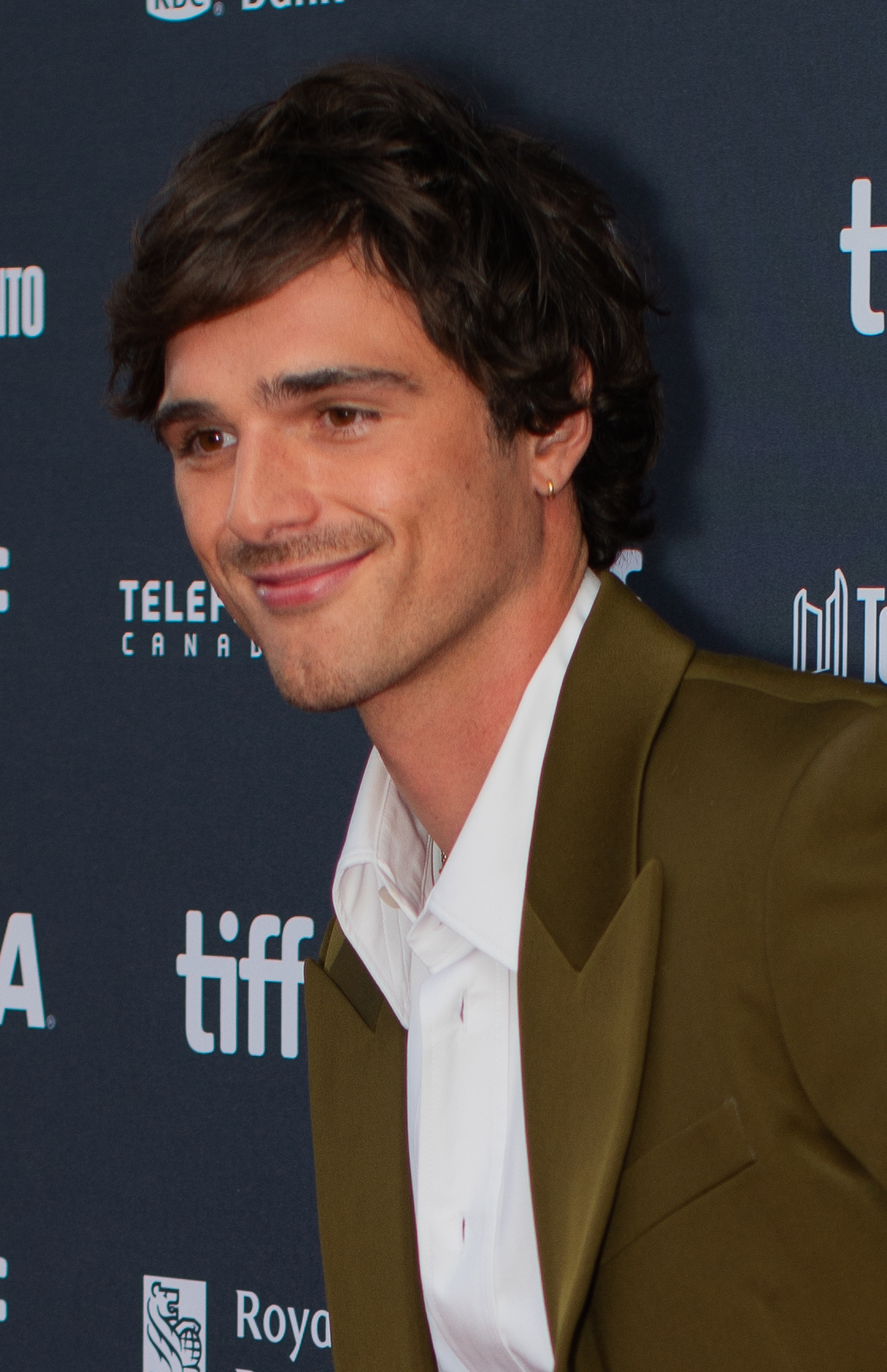
Elordi at the 2024 Toronto International Film Festival

In the first half of 2023, Elordi appeared as Ian, a British film actor, in Sean Price Williams' drama film The Sweet East, which premiered at the 76th Cannes Film Festival. Williams based Elordi's character in the film on Robert Pattinson following his role in The Twilight Saga. He also starred in the 2023 crime thriller film He Went That Way, adapted from the 1987 Conrad Hilberry novel Luke Karamazov, as Bobby, a 19-year-old serial killer. The film received negative reviews from critics, with Glenn Kenny of The New York Times writing in a review, "Elordi's performance here lacks the discipline he applied to his work in Priscilla and even the wretched Saltburn."

In late 2023 Elordi portrayed Elvis Presley in the Sofia Coppola–directed Priscilla Presley biopic Priscilla opposite Cailee Spaeny in the titular role. Coppola chose Elordi to play the role partially because of his "effect on women" during their first meeting, which she found comparable to Elvis's. Elordi was uninterested in portraying Elvis, partially due to the singing and dancing aspect of the person, but was eager to work with Coppola. Priscilla premiered at the 80th Venice International Film Festival, where it was met with positive reception. Gabriella Ferlita of PinkNews stated that Elordi "achieved countless words of praise for his rendition of The King" from critics. His performance was often compared by critics to that of Austin Butler in Elvis (2022). Richard Lawson of Vanity Fair wrote that Elordi "carefully calibrates Elvis's appeal and his pill-addled, domineering presence, his exacting demands and storms of frightening anger [in] a more enlightening take on the man than the one seen in Elvis".

In his final release of 2023, Elordi starred in Emerald Fennell's psychological drama Saltburn as Felix Catton, a wealthy and charismatic British Oxford University student. Critics from Empire, The Detroit News, and the Chicago Sun-Times described it as a star-making role for Elordi, while Nicholas Barber of BBC News described him in the film as "a revelation" and Marshall Shaffer of Slant wrote that his performance was "the secret weapon of Saltburn". For the role, he earned a nomination for the BAFTA Award for Best Actor in a Supporting Role.

In 2024 Elordi hosted an episode of Saturday Night Live. The episode received mostly negative critical reception for what critics found to be a heavy reliance on jokes about Elordi's attractiveness. Elordi starred in Oh, Canada, a drama film directed by Paul Schrader, in which he played the younger version of Richard Gere's character, an aging documentary filmmaker reminiscing on his life. Critics noted the lack of resemblance between Elordi and Gere, particularly due to Elordi being about half a foot taller than Gere. His second film role that year was in On Swift Horses, a period drama about LGBTQ relationships, in which he starred as Julius, a gambler who falls in love with another man in 1950s Las Vegas. He received acclaim for his work in the film from critics, including Robert Daniels of Screen Daily, who described it as "an electrifying performance", and Jourdain Searles of The Hollywood Reporter, who said that "Elordi gives his best performance yet as Julius, showing his more sensitive, vulnerable side on the big screen for perhaps the first time."

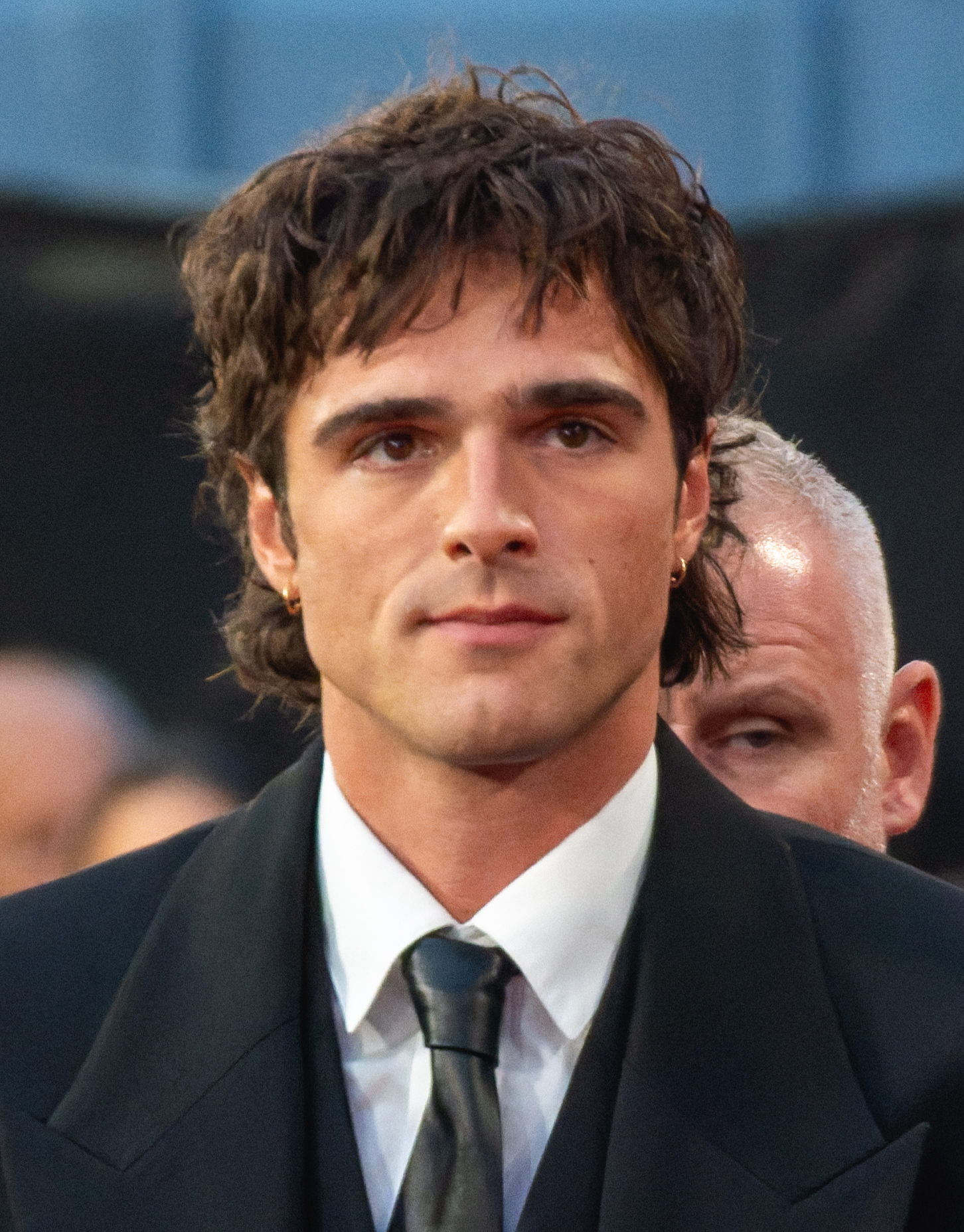
Elordi at the 2025 BFI London Film Festival

In 2025, Elordi played the lead role of Dorrigo Evans in a miniseries adaptation of the novel The Narrow Road to the Deep North. He next played the Creature (also known as Frankenstein's monster) in the Netflix horror film Frankenstein, directed by Guillermo del Toro. The film had its world premiere at the 82nd Venice International Film Festival and was released on 24 October 2025. RogerEbert.com considered his performance as Frankenstein's creation "marvelous in conveying the monster's intelligence, sensitivity, and inherent gentleness", while the Washington Post called it "transformative". Both of these roles earned him nominations at the 83rd Golden Globe Awards, for Best Actor in a Miniseries or Television Film and Best Supporting Actor in a Motion Picture. His role in Frankenstein also earned him nominations for the Academy Award for Best Supporting Actor and BAFTA Award for Best Actor in a Supporting Role.

He collaborated with director Emerald Fennell again for her adaptation of Wuthering Heights, in which he starred as Heathcliff opposite Margot Robbie. The film was released on 13 February 2026. On portraying the character depicted as a person of colour in the book, Elordi reasoned: "This is Emerald's interpretation of the text, and Emerald is an artist that I respect and admire, and I think her work is really important, so the only thing I think of is how can I serve the truth of my director? And how can I serve the truth of the screenplay that I have been handed?" With a global gross of $242 million, the film emerged as the first major commercial success of Elordi's career. In April of the same year, he reprised his role as Nate Jacobs in the third and final season of Euphoria. Although the season drew strong viewership, it ultimately concluded to mixed reviews. His next project was the leading role in Ridley Scott's science fiction film The Dog Stars, which was released on 26 August 2026.

== Public image ==
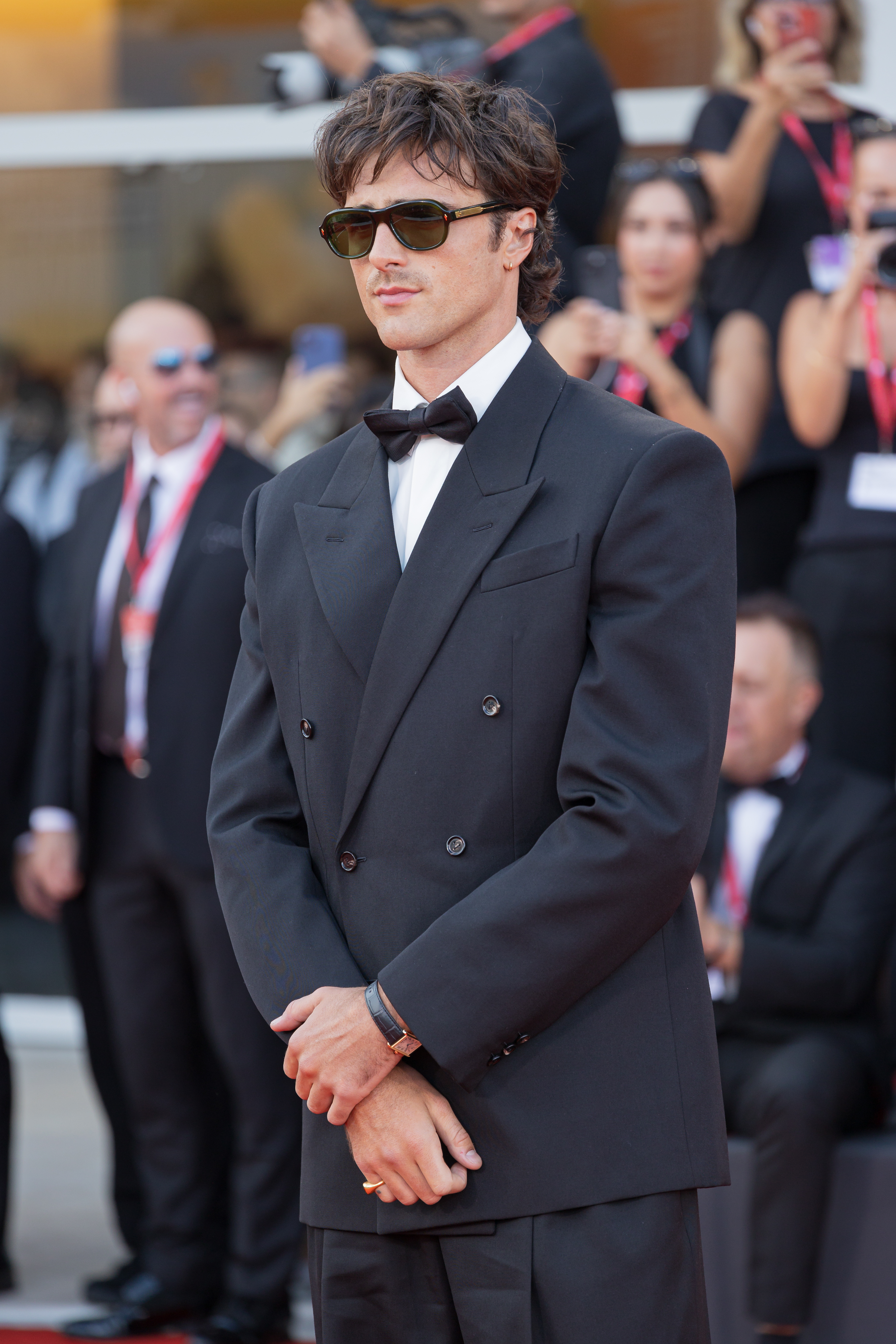
Elordi at the 2025 Venice International Film Festival

By the early 2020s Elordi became known as a teen heartthrob in the media. Gabriella Paiella of GQ wrote that Elordi had "classic, undeniable leading man looks", while Larisha Paul of Rolling Stone called him "Hollywood's reigning heartthrob of the 2020s". Elordi also became well known for his height of 1.95 metres (6 ft 5 in). Esther Zuckerman wrote of Elordi in The Atlantic that he was best known for being "very tall", "very handsome in a classical way" and "having a sharp-strong jawline and chin". He has also been an ambassador for brands such as Hugo Boss and TAG Heuer.

In March 2023, Elordi was granted a restraining order against Robert Dennis Furo, a man who had been stalking and harassing him at his home in Los Angeles. A judge ordered Furo to stay at least 100 yards from Elordi, his home, his car and his workplace at all times.

In February 2024 Joshua Fox, a producer for the KIIS 106.5 radio show The Kyle and Jackie O Show, alleged on the show that, after he asked Elordi for his bath water—a reference to his role in Saltburn—as a gift for host Jackie O, Elordi pushed him and put his hands around his neck. As of February 2024, the New South Wales Police Force were investigating the allegations.

== Personal life ==
Elordi has been romantically linked to his The Kissing Booth co-star Joey King, his Euphoria co-star Zendaya, model Kaia Gerber, YouTuber Olivia Jade and model Kendall Jenner.

== Filmography ==
Key
†	Denotes films that have not yet been released

=== Films ===
Year	Title	Role	Notes	Ref.
2017	Pirates of the Caribbean: Dead Men Tell No Tales	Extra Redcoat #1		
2018	Swinging Safari	Rooster		
2018	The Kissing Booth	Noah Flynn		
2019	The Mortuary Collection	Jake Matthews		
2020	The Kissing Booth 2	Noah Flynn		
2020	2 Hearts	Chris Gregory		
2020	The Very Excellent Mr. Dundee	Chase Hogan		
2021	The Kissing Booth 3	Noah Flynn		
2022	Deep Water	Charlie De Lisle		
2023	The Sweet East	Ian Reynolds		
2023	He Went That Way	Bobby Falls	Also executive producer	
2023	Priscilla	Elvis Presley		
2023	Saltburn	Felix Catton		
2024	Oh, Canada	Young Leonard Fife		
2024	On Swift Horses	Julius Walker	Also executive producer	
2025	Frankenstein	The Creature		
2026	Wuthering Heights	Heathcliff		
2026	The Dog Stars	Hig		
2027	Scapegoat †	TBA	Filming	
2027	Outer Dark †	Culla Holme	Pre-production	
TBA	The Executioner’s Song †	Gary Gilmore	Also producer; remake of same name 1982 television film	

=== Television ===
Year	Title	Role	Notes	Ref.
2019–2026	Euphoria	Nate Jacobs	Main role	
2020	Acting for a Cause	Mr. Darcy	Episode: "Pride and Prejudice"	
2024	Saturday Night Live	Host	Episode: "Jacob Elordi / Reneé Rapp"	
2025	The Narrow Road to the Deep North	Dorrigo Evans	Miniseries; main role	

=== Music videos ===
Year	Title	Artist	Ref.
2025	"Day One"	Bon Iver featuring Dijon and Flock of Dimes	

== Awards and nominations ==
Award	Year	Category	Work	Result	Ref.
AACTA Awards	2022	Audience Choice Award for Best Actor	Euphoria	Nominated	
AACTA Awards	2024	Best Supporting Actor	Saltburn	Nominated	
AACTA Awards	2026	Best Lead Actor in Television Drama	The Narrow Road to the Deep North	Won	
AACTA Awards	2026	Audience Choice Award for Favourite Australian Actor	—N/a	Won	
AACTA Awards	2026	Best Supporting Actor	Frankenstein	Won	
Academy Awards	2026	Best Supporting Actor	Frankenstein	Nominated	
Actor Awards	2026	Outstanding Performance by a Cast in a Motion Picture	Frankenstein	Nominated	
Actor Awards	2026	Outstanding Performance by a Male Actor in a Supporting Role	Frankenstein	Nominated	
Alliance of Women Film Journalists	2025	Best Supporting Actor	Frankenstein	Nominated	
Astra Film Awards	2026	Best Supporting Actor – Drama	Frankenstein	Nominated	
Austin Film Critics Association	2025	Best Supporting Actor	Frankenstein	Nominated	
BAFTA Film Awards	2024	Rising Star Award	—N/a	Nominated	
BAFTA Film Awards	2024	Best Actor in a Supporting Role	Saltburn	Nominated	
BAFTA Film Awards	2026	Best Actor in a Supporting Role	Frankenstein	Nominated	
Chicago Film Critics Association	2025	Best Supporting Actor	Frankenstein	Nominated	
Critics' Choice Movie Awards	2026	Best Supporting Actor	Frankenstein	Won	
Critics' Choice Super Awards	2026	Best Actor in a Science Fiction/Fantasy Movie	Frankenstein	Nominated	
Dorian Awards	2025	Supporting Film Performance of the Year	Frankenstein	Nominated	
Georgia Film Critics Association	2025	Best Supporting Actor	Frankenstein	Runner-up	
Golden Globe Awards	2026	Best Actor in a Miniseries or Television Film	The Narrow Road to the Deep North	Nominated	
Golden Globe Awards	2026	Best Supporting Actor in a Motion Picture	Frankenstein	Nominated	
Gotham Awards	2025	Outstanding Supporting Performance	Frankenstein	Nominated	
Gotham Awards	2025	Vanguard Tribute	Frankenstein	Honored	
Houston Film Critics Society	2025	Best Supporting Actor	Frankenstein	Won	
Kansas City Film Critics Circle	2025	Best Supporting Actor	Frankenstein	Nominated	
Las Vegas Film Critics Society	2025	Best Supporting Actor	Frankenstein	Nominated	
London Film Critics' Circle	2026	Supporting Actor of the Year	Frankenstein	Nominated	
New York Film Critics Online	2025	Best Supporting Actor	Frankenstein	Won	
Newport Beach Film Festival	2025	Maverick Award	Frankenstein	Won	
Online Film Critics Society	2025	Best Supporting Actor	Frankenstein	Nominated	
Palm Springs International Film Festival	2026	Visionary Award	Frankenstein	Honored	
People's Choice Awards	2024	Drama Movie Star	Priscilla	Nominated	
People's Choice Awards	2024	Movie Performance	Saltburn	Nominated	
San Diego Film Critics Society	2025	Best Supporting Actor	Frankenstein	Nominated	
San Francisco Bay Area Film Critics Circle	2025	Best Supporting Actor	Frankenstein	Nominated	
Santa Barbara International Film Festival	2026	Virtuoso Award	Frankenstein	Won	
Satellite Awards	2026	Best Actor in a Supporting Role	Frankenstein	Nominated	
Seattle Film Critics Society	2025	Best Supporting Actor	Frankenstein	Nominated	
Toronto Film Critics Association	2025	Outstanding Supporting Performance	Frankenstein	Runner-up	
Washington D.C. Area Film Critics Association	2025	Best Supporting Actor	Frankenstein	Nominated	

== See also ==
- List of Academy Award winners and nominees from Australia
- List of Australian film actors
