= Indie Book Awards Book of the Year – Non-Fiction =

Prize category in Australian book awards

The Indie Book Awards Book of the Year – Non-Fiction is a prize category in the annual Indie Book Awards (Australia) presented by Australian Independent Booksellers.

The award was established in 2008.

== Winners and shortlists ==
=== 2008–2009 ===
Indie Book Awards Book of the Year – Non-Fiction
Year	Author	Title	Result	Ref.
2008	Don Watson	American Journeys	Winner	
2009	Chloe Hooper	The Tall Man: Death and Life on Palm Island	Winner	

=== 2010–2019 ===
Indie Book Awards Book of the Year – Non-Fiction
Year	Author	Title	Result	Ref.
2010	Not awarded			
2011	Anh Do	The Happiest Refugee	Winner	
2012	William McInnes & Sarah Watt	Worse Things Happen at Sea	Winner	
2012	Betty Churcher	Notebooks	Finalist	
2012	Paul Keating	After Words	Finalist	
2012	Michael Kirby	A Private Life: Fragments, Memories, Friends	Finalist	
2013	Richard de Crespigny	QF32	Winner	
2013	Paul Ham	Sandakan	Finalist	
2013	Michael Leunig	The Essential Leunig: Cartoons from a Winding Path	Finalist	
2013	Paul Lockyer	Lake Eyre	Finalist	
2014	David Hunt	Girt	Winner	
2014	Hugh Mackay	The Good Life	Finalist	
2014	John Safran	Murder in Mississippi	Finalist	
2014	Kerry-Anne Walsh	The Stalking of Julia Gillard	Finalist	
2015	Don Watson	The Bush: Travels in the Heart of Australia	Winner	
2015	Emma Ayres	Cadence	Finalist	
2015	Tim Low	Where Song Began	Finalist	
2015	Helen Garner	This House of Grief	Finalist	
2016	Magda Szubanski	Reckoning: A Memoir	Winner	
2016	Richard Glover	Flesh Wounds	Finalist	
2016	Kate Grenville	One Life	Finalist	
2016	Rosie Waterland	The Anti-Cool Girl	Finalist	
2017	Helen Garner	Everywhere I Look	Winner	
2017	Maxine Beneba Clarke	The Hate Race	Finalist	
2017	Richard Fidler	Ghost Empire	Finalist	
2017	Clementine Ford	Fight Like a Girl	Finalist	
2018	Richard Fidler & Kári Gíslason	Saga Land	Winner	
2018	Jimmy Barnes	Working Class Man	Finalist	
2018	Georgia Blain	The Museum of Words	Finalist	
2018	Sarah Krasnostein	The Trauma Cleaner	Finalist	
2019	Chloe Hooper	The Arsonist	Winner	
2019	Richard Glover	The Land Before Avocado	Finalist	
2019	Bri Lee	Eggshell Skull	Finalist	
2019	Leigh Sales	Any Ordinary Day	Finalist	

=== 2020– ===
Indie Book Awards Book of the Year – Non-Fiction
Year	Author	Title	Result	Ref.
2020	Archie Roach	Tell Me Why	Winner	
2020	Claire Bowditch	Your Own Kind of Girl	Finalist	
2020	Kitty Flanagan	488 Rules for Life: The Thankless Art of Being Correct	Finalist	
2020	Tyson Yunkaporta	Sand Talk: How Indigenous Thinking Can Save the World	Finalist	
2021	Julia Baird	Phosphorescence	Winner	
2021	Eddie Jaku	The Happiest Man on Earth	Finalist	
2021	Grace Karskens	People of the River	Finalist	
2021	Cassandra Pybus	Truganini: Journey Through the Apocalypse	Finalist	
2022	Trent Dalton	Love Stories	Winner	
2022	Bri Lee	Who Gets to Be Smart	Finalist	
2022	Richard Flanagan	Toxic: The Rotting Underbelly of the Tasmanian Salmon Industry	Finalist	
2022	Caroline Graham and Kylie Stevenson	Larrimah	Finalist	
2023	Richard Fidler	The Book of Roads and Kingdoms	Winner	
2023	Duane Hamacher, with Elders and Knowledge Holders	The First Astronomers	Finalist	
2023	Heather Rose	Nothing Bad Ever Happens Here	Finalist	
2023	Grace Tame	The Ninth Life of a Diamond Miner	Finalist	
2024	David Marr	Killing for Country: A Family Story	Winner	
2024	Julia Baird	Bright Shining	Finalist	
2024	Anna Funder	Wifedom: Mrs Orwell's Invisible Life	Finalist	
2024	Grantlee Kieza	The Remarkable Mrs Reibey	Finalist	
2025	Markus Zusak	Three Wild Dogs and the Truth	Winner	
2025	Gina Chick	We Are the Stars	Finalist	
2025	Helen Garner	The Season	Finalist	
2025	Grantlee Kieza	Sister Viv	Finalist	
2026	Hannah Kent	Always Home, Always Homesick	Winner	
2026	Geraldine Brooks	Memorial Days	Finalist	
2026	Helen Garner, Chloe Hooper and Sarah Krasnostein	The Mushroom Tapes	Finalist	
2026	John Lyons	A Bunker in Kyiv	Finalist	
