= Nita Kibble Literary Awards =

Australian literary award

The Kibble Literary Awards, formerly known as the Nita Kibble Literary Awards, are a former set of two Australian literary awards: the Nita B Kibble Literary Award, which recognises the work of an established Australian female writer, and the Dobbie Literary Award, which is for a first published work by a female writer. Named in honour of State Library of New South Wales librarian Nita Kibble, the awards recognise the works of women writers of fiction or non-fiction classified as "life writing". They were established in 1994, and ceased after 2018.

== History ==
The Nita Kibble Literary Awards were established in 1994 by Nita Dobbie, through her will, in honour of her aunt, Nita Kibble (1879–1962), who had raised her from birth after her mother died. Kibble, who was the first woman to be a librarian with the State Library of New South Wales, served the role of principal research librarian from 1919 until retirement in 1943, and was founding member of the Australian Institute of Librarians. Dobbie followed her aunt into the library profession, and believed there was a need to foster women's writing in the community.

The Trust established for the award was managed by Perpetual Limited, and the award was administered in association with the State Library of New South Wales.

Both awards were presented annually from their inception until 2016, when they were changed to biennial presentation. The last awards were presented in 2018, "due to a review of the funding trust and the award processes".

== Description ==
The Kibble Literary Awards comprised two awards—the Nita B Kibble Literary Award, which recognised the work of an established Australian female writer, and the Dobbie Literary Award, which is for a first published work by a female writer. The awards recognised the works of women writers of fiction or non-fiction classified as "life writing". This includes novels, autobiographies, biographies, literature and any writing with a strong personal element.

The awards were worth A$35,000 in total in 2018.

== Nita B Kibble Literary Award honorees ==
Nita B Kibble Literary Award winners and finalists
Year	Author	Title	Result	Ref.
1994	Marion Halligan	Lovers' Knots: A Hundred-Year Novel	Winner	
1994	Joan Dugdale	The Gripping Beast	Finalist	
1994	Evelyn Crawford	Over My Tracks	Finalist	
1994	Hazel Rowley	Christina Stead Bio	Finalist	
1995	Drusilla Modjeska	The Orchard	Winner	
1995	Rita Cynthia Huggins and Jackie Huggins	Auntie Rita	Finalist	
1995	Simone Lazaroo	The World Waiting to be Made	Finalist	
1995	Brenda Niall	Georgiana	Finalist	
1995	Susan Varga	Heddy and me	Finalist	
1996	Judy Cassab	Judy Cassab: Diaries	Winner	
1996	Debra Adelaide	Hotel Albatross	Finalist	
1996	Hanifa Deen	Caravanserai: Journey among Australian Muslims	Finalist	
1996	Penelope Nelson	Penny Dreadful	Finalist	
1996	Mandy Sayer	The Cross	Finalist	
1997	Helen Garner	True Stories: Selected Non-Fiction	Winner	
1997	Glenda Adams	The Tempest of Clemenza	Finalist	
1997	Anne Coombs	Sex and Anarchy	Finalist	
1997	Suzanne Falkiner	Ethel	Finalist	
1997	Ethel Sue Woolfe	Leaning Towards Infinity	Finalist	
1998	Roberta Sykes	Snake Cradle	Winner	
1998	Barbara Blackman	Glass After Glass: Autobiographical Reflections	Finalist	
1998	Sally Dingo	Dingo	Finalist	
1998	Delia Falconer	The Service of Clouds	Finalist	
1998	Anne Whitehead	Paradise Mislaid: In Search of the Australian Tribe of Paraguay	Finalist	
1999	Geraldine Brooks	Foreign Correspondence: A Pen Pal's Journey From Down Under to All Over	Winner	
1999	Frances De Groen	Xavier Herbert	Finalist	
1999	Kathy Golski	Watched by Ancestors	Finalist	
1999	Marion Halligan	The Golden Dress	Finalist	
1999	Rowena Ivers	The Spotted Skin	Finalist	
2000	Drusilla Modjeska	Stravinsky's Lunch	Winner	
2000	Thea Astley	Drylands	Finalist	
2000	Kate Grenville	Idea of Perfection	Finalist	
2000	Valerie Lawson	Out of the Sky She Came	Finalist	
2000	Amy Witting	Isobel on the Way to the Corner Shop	Finalist	
2001	Inga Clendinnen	Tiger's Eye: A Memoir	Winner	
2001	Ruth Cracknell	Journey from Venice	Finalist	
2002	Jacqueline Kent	A Certain Style: Beatrice Davis, a Literary Life	Winner	
2002	Marion Halligan	The Fog Garden	Finalist	
2002	Hilary McPhee	Other People's Words	Finalist	
2003	Gail Jones	Black Mirror	Winner	
2003	Kate Lyons	The Water Underneath	Finalist	
2003	Gaby Naher	The Truth About My Fathers	Finalist	
2003	Brenda Niall	The Boyds: A Family Biography	Finalist	
2004	Fiona Capp	That Oceanic Feeling	Winner	
2004	Gail Bell	Shot	Finalist	
2004	Anne Summers	The End of Equality	Finalist	
2005	Gay Bilson	Plenty	Winner	
2005	Helen Garner	Joe Cinque's Consolation	Finalist	
2005	Susan Johnson	The Broken Book	Finalist	
2006	Brenda Walker	The Wing of Night	Winner	
2006	Kate Grenville	The Secret River	Finalist	
2006	Heather Rose	The Butterfly Man	Finalist	
2007	Deborah Robertson	Careless	Winner	
2007	Inga Clendinnen	Agamemnon's Kiss	Finalist	
2007	Kathryn Heyman	Captain Starlight's Apprentice	Finalist	
2007	Gail Jones	Dreams of Speaking	Finalist	
2007	Sylvia Martin	Ida Leeson: A Life	Finalist	
2008	Carol Lefevre	Nights in the Asylum	Winner	
2008	Gail Jones	Sorry	Finalist	
2008	Mireille Juchau	Burning In	Finalist	
2009	Jacqueline Kent	An Exacting Heart: The Story of Hephzibah Menuhin	Winner	
2009	Georgia Blain	Births Deaths and Marriages: True Tales	Finalist	
2009	Kathleen Stewart	The After Life: A memoir	Finalist	
2010	Shirley Walker	The Ghost at the Wedding	Winner	
2010	Josephine Emery	The Real Possibility of Joy	Finalist	
2010	Kristina Olsson	The China Garden	Finalist	
2011	Brenda Walker	Reading by Moonlight	Winner	
2011	Delia Falconer	Sydney	Finalist	
2011	Annette Stewart	Barbara Hanrahan: A Biography	Finalist	
2012	Gail Jones	Five Bells	Winner	
2012	Gillian Mears	Foal's Bread	Finalist	
2012	Charlotte Wood	Animal People	Finalist	
2013	Annah Faulkner	The Beloved	Winner	
2013	Michelle de Kretser	Questions of Travel	Finalist	
2013	Cate Kennedy	Like a House on Fire	Finalist	
2014	Kristina Olsson	Boy Lost: A Family Memoir	Winner	
2014	Debra Adelaide	Letter to George Clooney	Finalist	
2014	Melissa Lucashenko	Mullumbimby	Finalist	
2015	Joan London	The Golden Age	Winner	
2015	Sophie Cunningham	Warning: The Story of Cyclone	Finalist	
2015	Helen Garner	This House of Grief	Finalist	
2016	Fiona Wright	Small Acts of Disappearance	Winner	
2016	Elizabeth Harrower	A Few Days in the Country: And Other Stories	Finalist	
2016	Drusilla Modjeska	Second Half First	Finalist	
2017	No award presented			
2018	Fiona McFarlane	The High Places	Winner	
2018	Maxine Beneba Clarke	The Hate Race	Finalist	
2018	Michelle de Kretser	The Life to Come	Finalist	
2018	Helen Garner	Everywhere I Look	Finalist	

== Dobbie Literary Award honorees ==
Dobbie Literary Award winners and finalists
Year	Author	Title	Result	Ref.
1994	Nola Fisher	For Some Reason	Winner	
1994	Mary Burbidge	My Daughter, My Forever Baby	Finalist	
1995	Maria Cresa	Lapping, Licking and Skinny	Finalist	
1996	Alana Valentine	H Is for Homo	Finalist	
1997	Pepe Trevor	Listening for Small Sounds	Winner	
1997	Fiona Capp	Night Surfing	Finalist	
1997	Catherine Ford	Dirt	Finalist	
1997	Connie Nungulla	When You Grow Up	Finalist	
1997	Margot Orum	Fairytales in Reality	Finalist	
1998	Melissa Lucashenko	Steam Pigs	Winner	
1999	Eva Sallis	Hiam	Winner	
2000	Margo Kingston	Off the Rails: The Pauline Hanson Trip	Winner	
2001	Kim Mahood	Craft for a Dry lake	Winner	
2001	Mischa Merz	Bruising	Finalist	
2001	Elizabeth Stead	The Fishcastle	Finalist	
2001	Hsu Ming Teo	Love and Vertigo	Finalist	
2002	Julie Marcus	The Indomitable Miss Pink: A life in Anthropology	Winner	
2002	Susan Addison	Mother Lode: Stories of Home Life & Home Death	Finalist	
2003	Shirley Painter	The Bean Patch	Winner	
2003	Saskia Beudel	Borrowed Eyes	Finalist	
2003	Rebe Taylor	Unearthed	Finalist	
2004	Danielle Wood	The Alphabet of Light and Dark	Winner	
2004	Phyllis McDuff	A Story of Light & Dark	Finalist	
2004	Heather Tyler	Asylum: Voices Behind the Razor Wire	Finalist	
2005	Paulette Gittins	The Secret World of Annette Robinson	Winner	
2005	Sarah Armstrong	Salt Rain	Finalist	
2005	Kimberley Starr	The Kingdom Where Nobody Dies	Finalist	
2006	Carrie Tiffany	Everyman's Rules for Scientific Living	Winner	
2006	Debra Drake	An Uncommon Dialogue	Finalist	
2006	Kate Holden	In My Skin	Finalist	
2006	Wendy James	Out of the Silence	Finalist	
2006	Mary Ellen Jordan	Balanda, My Year in Arnheim Land	Finalist	
2007	Tara June Winch	Swallow the Air	Winner	
2007	Susan Duncan	Salvation Creek	Finalist	
2007	Ruth Ritchie	Waterlemon	Finalist	
2008	Karen Foxlee	The Anatomy of Wings	Winner	
2008	Emma Hardman	Nine Parts Water	Finalist	
2008	Jessica White	A Curious Intimacy	Finalist	
2009	Claire Thomas	Fugitive Blue	Winner	
2009	Darleen Bungey	Arthur Boyd: A Life	Finalist	
2009	Toni Jordan	Addition	Finalist	
2010	Deborah Forster	The Book of Emmett	Winner	
2010	Karen Hitchcock	Little White Slips	Finalist	
2010	Robyn Mundy	The Nature of Ice	Finalist	
2011	Kristel Thornell	Night Street	Winner	
2011	Lara Fergus	My Sister Chaos	Finalist	
2011	G.L. Osborne	Come Inside	Finalist	
2012	Favel Parrett	Past the Shallows	Winner	
2012	Leah Swann	Bearings	Finalist	
2012	Amy T.Matthews	End of the Night Girl	Finalist	
2013	Lily Chan	Toyo: A Memoir	Winner	
2013	Romy Ash	Floundering	Finalist	
2013	Courtney Collins	The Burial	Finalist	
2014	Kate Richards	Madness: A Memoir	Winner	
2014	Fiona McFarlane	The Night Guest	Finalist	
2014	Jill Stark	High Sobriety: My Year Without Booze	Finalist	
2015	Ellen van Neerven	Heat and Light	Winner	
2015	Emily Bitto	The Strays	Finalist	
2015	Christine Piper	After Darkness	Finalist	
2016	Lucy Treloar	Salt Creek	Winner	
2016	Shirley Barrett	Rush Oh!	Finalist	
2016	Magda Szubanski	Reckoning: A Memoir	Finalist	
2018	Sarah Krasnostein	The Trauma Cleaner	Winner	
2018	Madelaine Dickie	Troppo	Finalist	
2018	Micheline Lee	The Healing Party	Finalist	

== See also ==
- Australian History Awards
- Australian literature
- List of Australian literary awards
- List of literary awards
- National Biography Award
