= The Spare Room =

2008 novel by Helen Garner

- First hardback edition cover
- Author: Helen Garner
- Cover artist: W. H. Chong
- Language: English
- Genre: Novel
- Publisher: Text Publishing
- Publication date: 7 April 2008
- Publication place: Australia
- Media type: Print
- Pages: 195 pp
- Awards: Barbara Jefferis Award
- ISBN: 978-1-921351-39-6
- Preceded by: Cosmo Cosmolino

The Spare Room is a 2008 novel by Australian writer Helen Garner, set over the course of three weeks while the narrator, Helen, cares for a friend dying of bowel cancer.

== Plot summary ==
The novel is told from the first person perspective of a woman, Helen, who lives in Melbourne near her family. A friend, Nicola, who is ill with bowel cancer, comes to stay with Helen in order to pursue alternative therapy for her disease. The cancer is considered terminal by her doctors. Helen is suspicious of the treatment and becomes more so as she sees its deleterious health effects.

As the three weeks of the novel progress, Helen becomes increasingly angry with Nicola for denying the seriousness of her illness, forcing those around her to do emotional work on her behalf in confronting her death, and making light of them for doing so. At the end of the novel, Nicola returns to mainstream oncology treatment, and the doctors find that some of her symptoms are due to cancer having destroyed part of her vertebrae.

The novel flashes forward to the months ahead, when Nicola returns to Sydney and eventually dies. A number of friends and family, including Helen, take turns as her caretaker. Nicola only truly embraces her death when a Buddhist friend tells her that in dying, she has something to teach them.

The novel draws heavily on both events and details from Garner's life. The narrator, Helen, lives next door to her daughter Eva and Eva's children, as Garner does with her daughter Alice Garner and her children, and plays the ukulele as Garner does. The events in the novel are based on Garner's spending a period caring for her friend, Jenya Osborne, when Osborne was dying. Garner chose to use her own first name for the narrator character as she wanted to admit to the least attractive or acceptable emotions that she felt as her friend died.

== Critical response ==
The publication of The Spare Room received considerable media coverage and the novel was favourably reviewed in several major Australian metropolitan newspapers. Points of interest included: Garner's simple and powerful prose style; Garner's return to fiction after the sixteen years since her last novel; and praise for her treatment of illness, mortality and the unattractive emotions it involves. Some reviewers found the strong similarities with Garner's life distracting. One noted some of the advantages of fiction, in that Garner was able to resolve the story in the novel in a way she could not in her major non-fiction works The First Stone and Joe Cinque's Consolation. Robert Dessaix wrote an extended review that although favourable argued that The Spare Room is not a novel, but closer to a piece of journalism or a report from a metaphorical battle front, particularly as the novel is highly focused on Helen's point of view and never on Nicola's interior experience. James Wood listed it in his New Yorker column for the Best Books of 2009.

== Awards ==
Year	Award	Category	Result	Ref
2008	Queensland Premier's Literary Awards	Fiction Book	Won	
2008	Victorian Premier's Literary Awards	Vance Palmer Prize for Fiction	Won	
2009	Barbara Jefferis Award	—	Won	
