= This House of Grief =

2014 non-fiction book by Helen Garner

This House of Grief: The Story of a Murder Trial
- First edition
- Author: Helen Garner
- Language: English
- Genre: True crime
- Publisher: Text Publishing
- Publication date: 20 August 2014
- Publication place: Australia
- Pages: 288
- ISBN: 978-1-92207920-6

This House of Grief is a 2014 non-fiction book by Helen Garner. Subtitled "The story of a murder trial", its subject matter is the trial and conviction of Robert Farquharson for the murder of his three children by driving his car into a dam in rural Victoria, Australia. The book has been critically lauded, with The Australian declaring it a "literary masterpiece".

== Background ==
On 4 September 2005 a car driven by Robert Farquharson left the road and crashed into a dam outside Winchelsea, Victoria, resulting in the deaths of his three sons. A year before the incident, Farquharson's wife had left him for another man and taken their children, who he had access to on weekends or special occasions. He was convicted of their murder on 5 October 2007. Farquharson appealed and, on 17 December 2009, the conviction was set aside and a new trial ordered. The retrial commenced on 4 May 2010 before Lex Lasry. The jury retired to consider its verdict on 19 July 2010 after hearing 11 weeks of evidence and argument. On 22 July, after three days of deliberation, the second jury again found Farquharson guilty of murder. On 15 October 2010, he was sentenced to life imprisonment with a 33-year minimum.

== Writing ==
=== Epigram ===
The epigram to the book is "this treasury of pain, this house of power and grief", a quotation from the Hungarian poet Dezső Kosztolányi's novel Kornél Esti. The epigram is directed to the Supreme Court of Victoria.

=== Writing process ===
Garner was reported as present in courts during the seven years that the case took to be finally decided. Garner participated in annual workshops run by the Judicial College of Victoria. She produced a number of drafts on the trial and story, including one titled The Dam, which she scrapped in 2009 at the behest of her publisher.

== Critical reception ==
Garner takes us into the courtroom and shows us a melting pot of venality. She writes with a profound understanding of human vulnerability, and of the subtle workings of love, memory and remorse.

— The Economist

In The Monthly, Ramona Koval wrote that the work was "devastating, utterly compelling". In an essay in the website The Conversation, the writer was of the opinion that Garner "fails to address the broader issues of gender inequality and male violence". In The Australian, Peter Craven wrote that the book was "some kind of masterpiece and Garner creates, moment by moment, with a breathtaking suspension of judgment, the whirlwind that blows across every corner of this story like a hard rain that comes with the force of a desolation, sparing nothing." Craven also noted that Garner had previously written about legal cases as "an old hand at using a novelist’s technique to create a pointillist image of a trial" in The First Stone and Joe Cinque's Consolation. In the UK daily newspaper The Guardian, Kate Clanchy wrote, "[…] the whole book feels final, elegiac – perhaps because for all the horror, it is so elegantly and calmly written; perhaps because This House of Grief completes so many arcs begun in Garner's previous works; perhaps because it is impossible to imagine it being done better".

Some critics noted the similarities between This House of Grief and Truman Capote's In Cold Blood (1966), another non-fiction novel. Kate Atkinson wrote, "Helen Garner is an invaluable guide into harrowing territory and offers powerful and unforgettable insights. This House of Grief, in its restraint and control, bears comparison with In Cold Blood", while Eileen Battersby, writing for the Irish Times said, "Helen Garner’s account of the trial is a non-literary variation of Truman Capote's In Cold Blood". The Atlantic gave a positive review, writing, "[Garner] doesn't merely listen. She watches, imagines, second-guesses, empathises, agonises. Her voice—intimate yet sharp, wry yet urgent—inspires trust."

The Victorian Chief Justice, The Hon. Marilyn Warren AC wrote a congratulatory letter to Garner on the release of the book in September 2014. In her letter, Warren called the book "utterly riveting". She went on to comment that the book "sought to educate, rather than merely entertain, the general public about the demands of the criminal justice system".

In October 2023, John Powers, NPR's pop culture critic, described the book thus: "Garner uses the case — and her reactions to it — to think about wounded masculinity, collapsing families, the theatricality of courtrooms and the unknowable mystery of human behavior. Tinged with mourning, the book leaves us wondering what justice might mean in a tragedy where everyone winds up a victim."

== Awards and nominations ==
- 2015 shortlisted Indie Awards — Non-fiction
- 2015 longlisted Stella Prize
- 2015 shortlisted Kibble Literary Awards — Nita Kibble Literary Award
- 2015 shortlisted Australian Book Industry Awards (ABIA) — Australian General Non-Fiction Book of the Year
- 2015 shortlisted New South Wales Premier's Literary Awards — Douglas Stewart Prize for Non-Fiction
- 2015 winner Ned Kelly Awards for Crime Writing — Best True Crime
- 2015 shortlisted Colin Roderick Award
- 2015 shortlisted Prime Minister's Literary Awards — Non-Fiction

== Translation ==
The book has been translated into German, under the title Drei Söhne: Ein Mordprozess.
