= The Children's Bach =

1984 novella by Australian author Helen Garner

- First edition
- Author: Helen Garner
- Language: English
- Publisher: McPhee Gribble
- Publication date: 1984
- Publication place: Australia
- Media type: Print
- Pages: 96
- ISBN: 0-86914-029-9
- OCLC: 12235425
- Dewey Decimal: 823 19
- LC Class: PR9619.3.G3 C45 1984

The Children's Bach (1984) is a novella by Australian writer Helen Garner. It was her third published book and her second novel. It was well received critically both in Australia and abroad.

== Plot summary ==
The novel, set in Melbourne, concerns a couple, Athena and Dexter, who lead a self-sufficient life with their two sons, one of whom is severely disabled. Their apparently "comfortable rut is disrupted by the arrival of Elizabeth, a tough nut from Dexter's past." Elizabeth brings with her her sister Vicki, Elizabeth's sometime lover Philip, and Philip's prepubescent daughter, Poppy. Through them, Athena and Dexter are drawn into a world whose ideas and values test the foundations of their relationship.

== Writing process ==
Helen Garner has said that, "I never have a theoretical idea for a book. What I write usually emerges from things I've witnessed, experiences I've had myself, or that people around me have had ... I don't invent a book out of thin air. I need —or I did at the time I wrote The Children's Bach— a bed of detail for the things to be based on before I can start to make something up". Garner goes on to say that, "I didn't know what was going to happen. I just knew that I wanted this family and that there would be a little boy who had something wrong with him, so you could only reach him through music. I hardly had any more idea than that."

== Themes ==
Kerryn Goldsworthy writes that almost all of Garner's fiction addresses "the relationship between sexual behaviour and social organisation; the anarchic nature of desire and the orderly face of the institution of 'family'". In The Children's Bach this is played out through its exploration of what happens when an apparently stable and caring marriage is challenged by the introduction of external forces —through Elizabeth, Philip and Vicki— which result in a "clash of values". The novel gives "a sense that characters are redefining their perspectives instead of being depicted at a stage when they are already locked into a fixed way of seeing, and surviving in, the world".

== Style and symbolism ==
Given the title, it is not surprising that music is the most obvious motif in the novella. It has been discussed by most of its critics and reviewers, as well as by Garner herself. Tiffin writes that music has always been important to Garner but that in the earlier works "it offered, like sex or drugs, a way of immersion or escape". However, in The Children's Bach "it is associated with most of the characters ... and it generally suggests sanity and harmony. While Philip uses music to exploit people, it is a mark of Athena's unglamorous dedication to making life work, and of Dexter's uncomplicated gusto."

=== Music ===
The book contains many references to music, both popular and classical. The title itself refers to The Children's Bach, a collection edited by Australian music educator E. Harold Davies. The collection consists of 20 simple Bach pieces for piano, selected mostly from the Clavier-Book for Anna Magdalena.

== Critical reception ==
While Garner's first novel, Monkey Grip (1977), met with a mixed reception in Australia initially, The Children's Bach was instantly better received and reviewed; Goldsworthy writes that it was "met with almost universal critical approval".

In 1986, Australian academic and critic, Don Anderson, wrote that "There are four perfect short novels in the English language. They are, in chronological order, Ford Madox Ford's The Good Soldier, Scott Fitzgerald's The Great Gatsby, Hemingway's The Sun Also Rises and Garner's The Children's Bach." In 1985, Melbourne critic Peter Craven wrote in Meanjin that The Children's Bach is "light years from any sparkling tell-it-all naturalism. It is concentrated realism of extraordinary formal polish and the amount of tonal variation which it gets from its seemingly simple plot is multifoliate to the point of being awesome".

After its first publication in 1984, it was published by Penguin Books in 1996 and again in 2008. It was re-published in October 2018 by Text Publishing, containing a foreword by Ben Lerner which states: "The efficiency and precision of Garner's descriptions allows her to accomplish in a sentence what for other writers would require pages of exposition, ruining the effect".

== Adaptations ==
In 2008 a chamber opera, based on the book and also titled The Children's Bach, was premiered at the Merlyn Theatre in Melbourne. It was composed by Andrew Schultz to a libretto by Glenn Perry.

== Awards and nominations ==
- 1986: South Australian Literary Award for fiction
