= Monkey Grip (novel) =

Novel by Helen Garner

- First edition
- Author: Helen Garner
- Language: English
- Publisher: McPhee Gribble
- Publication date: 16 September 1977
- Publication place: Australia
- Media type: Print
- Pages: 245
- ISBN: 0-14-004953-3
- OCLC: 11950836
- Dewey Decimal: 823 19
- LC Class: PR9619.3.G3 M6 1984
- Followed by: Honour & Other People's Children

Monkey Grip is a 1977 novel by Australian writer Helen Garner, her first published book. Set in Melbourne, the novel follows single-mother Nora as she narrates her increasingly tumultuous relationship with a heroin addict, juxtaposed with her raising a daughter while living in bohemian share houses.

The novel initially received a mixed critical reception while achieving notoriety for its astute, uncompromising depiction of heroin addiction, sexuality, relationships and love. Garner later admitted that there was an autobiographical element to the novel, with much of its plot being diaristic and based on her own experiences. Despite dividing early critics, the book sold well and helped establish Garner as one of the best-known writers in Australia. In the 1990s, when critics identified the Australian literary genre of grunge lit, Monkey Grip was retrospectively categorised as a seminal example. It is now widely considered a classic of modern Australian literature and one of Australia's "first contemporary novels", and has been called the "voice of a generation".

A film based on the novel, also titled Monkey Grip, was released in 1982. In 2018, Monkey Grip was ranked 47th by the British Broadcasting Corporation (BBC) in its list of the "100 stories that shaped the world"—the only Australian novel on the list.

== Plot summary ==
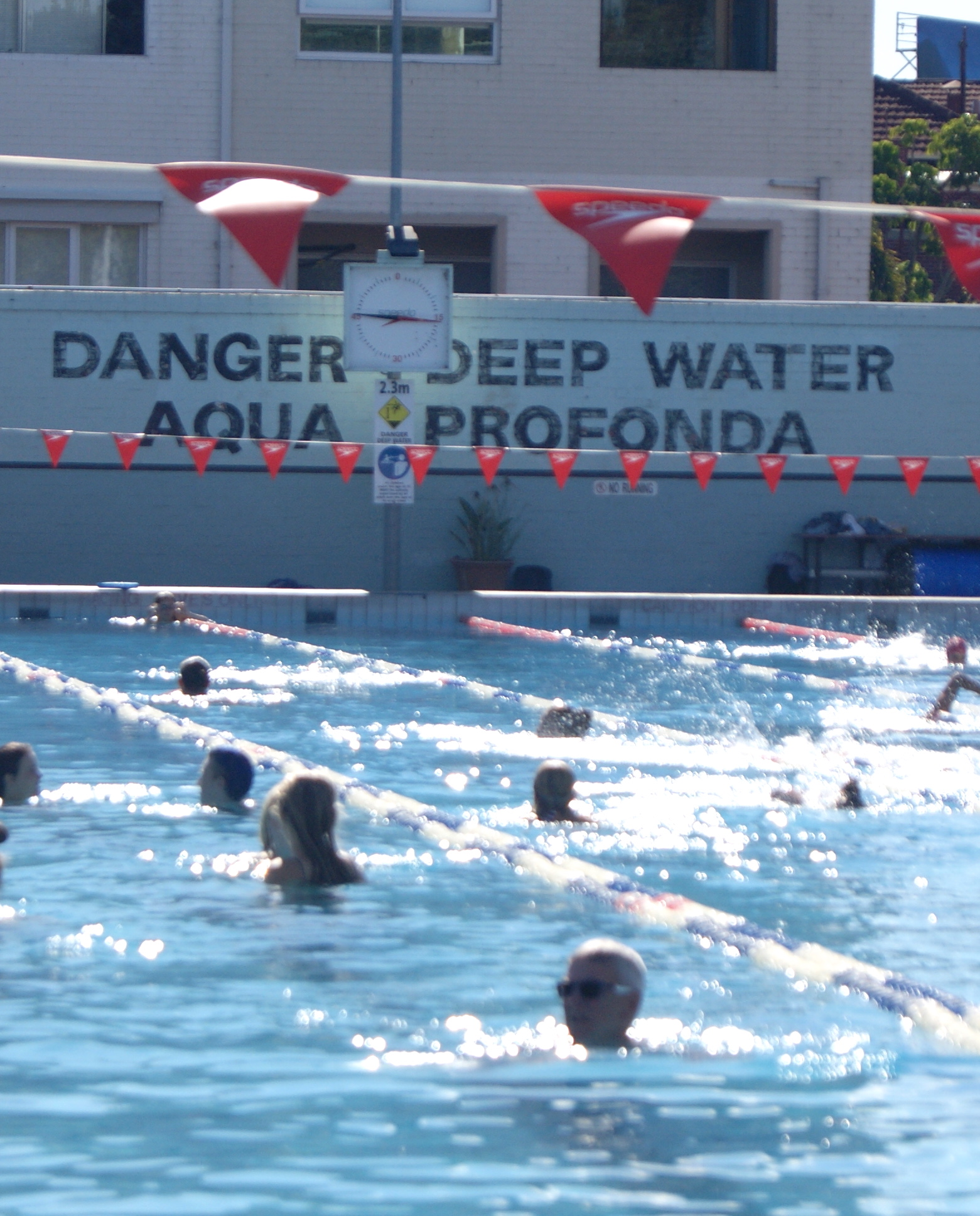
The heritage-listed "Aqua Profonda" sign at the Fitzroy baths, which many of the characters in Monkey Grip frequent during the hot summer days.

The novel is set in the inner city suburbs of Melbourne in the mid-1970s. The characters inhabit a lively social circle, frequenting cafés, restaurants, cinemas, theatres, pubs and clubs in the city. Nora, a single mother in her thirties, and her young daughter Grace, live in a succession of share houses. Nora is in love with the notoriously unreliable Javo, a twentysomething heroin addict, who repeatedly drifts in and out of Nora's life. Other characters, including Rita, a single mother and Nora's housemate, Gerald, Francis, Joss, Bill, Willy, Claire, and Martin (a former flame of Nora's), also drift in and out of the story. Most of the characters are artists, actors and creative types; many of them frequent the Fitzroy baths in summer. Nora, a freelance journalist, takes small acting gigs in independent films and edits a women's newspaper between jobs to make ends meet.

Nora's relationship with the flaky Javo is first put under strain when he is arrested in Bangkok for drug possession. As he returns, their relationship seems to ebb and flow: while, at a high point, the tentative couple, along with Nora's daughter Grace, go on trips across the country – first to Hobart, then a road trip to Sydney – at its lowest point, Javo steals from the share house to support his heroin habit and disappears for days on end, leaving Nora to wonder about his whereabouts and contemplate his return.

As their relationship intensifies, Nora questions how much of herself will be left if she is wrenched away by a love that is doomed to end. As their relationship approaches eventual disintegration due to Javo's drug addiction, deception, and unsavoury behaviour, Nora takes a short trip to Anglesea to clear her mind. Around this time, Javo seduces Nora's friend Claire, while Nora – drained and depersonalised from their relationship – returns home, forced to start anew and contemplate her feelings about their fleeting, destructive love affair.

== Publication and title ==
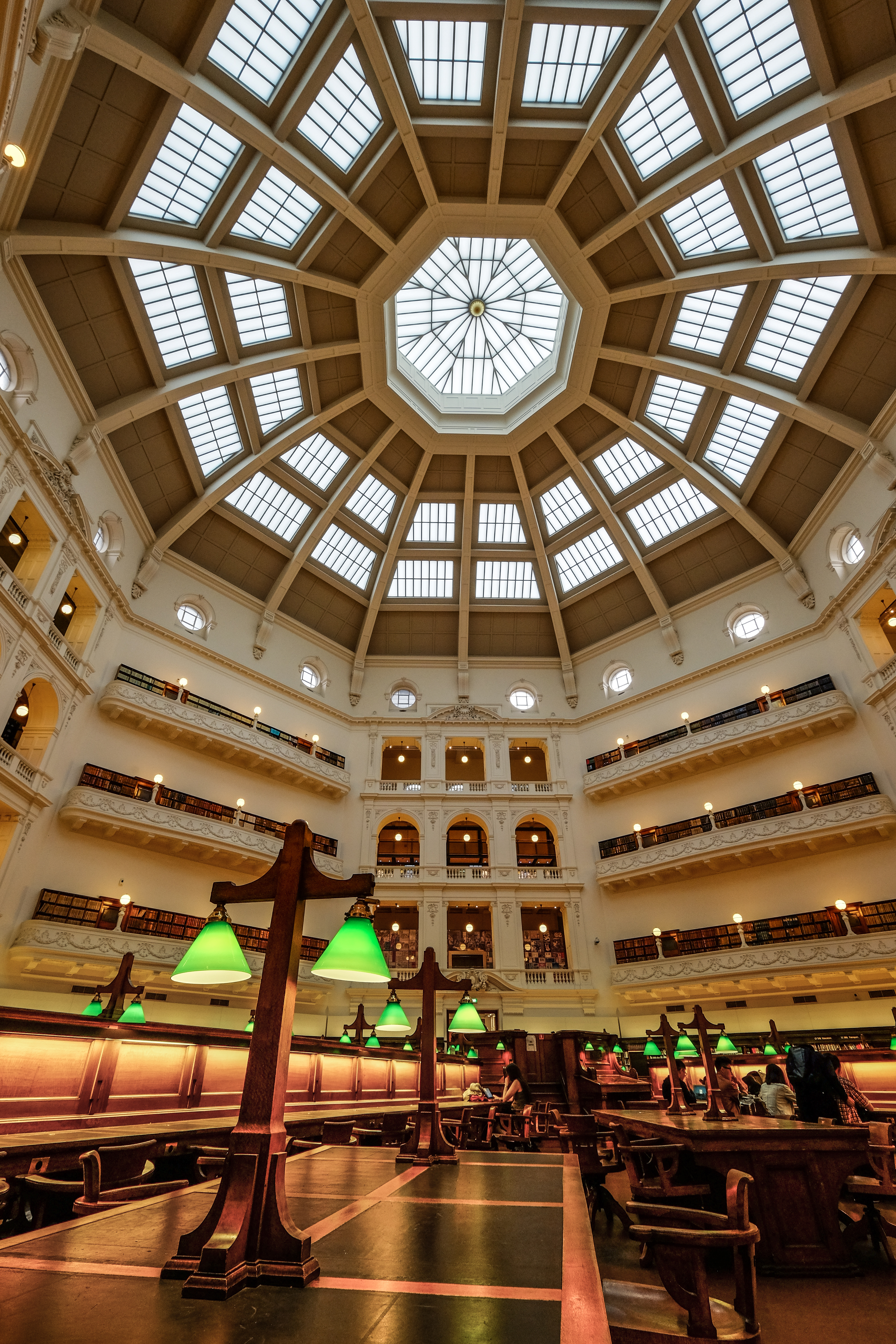
Much of the novel was transcribed from Garner's diary entries at Melbourne's La Trobe Reading room.

Much of the novel was based on Helen Garner's own experiences living in sharehouses in Fitzroy and Carlton in the mid-1970s – the relationship between Nora and Javo is based on a relationship Garner had during her time living in sharehousing while raising her daughter. Most of the novel was written in the Latrobe Reading Room at the State Library of Victoria.

Upon completion, Garner took a manuscript to Colin Talbot at Outback Press. This early draft did not feature the love story between Nora and Javo. Talbot suggested Garner try to shape her writing into a narrative, fleshing out certain relationships she had written about. After making significant changes by inserting the romantic relationship between Nora and Javo, Garner finally sent a copy to McPhee Gribble, an independent publishing house in Melbourne run by two women, after it was rejected by one male editor at a large Melbourne publishing house for being "too emotional".

Di Gribble of McPhee Gribble, the book's first publisher, wrote that the title of the novel referred to both a linking of hands and the monkey on your back of drug addiction.

== Themes ==
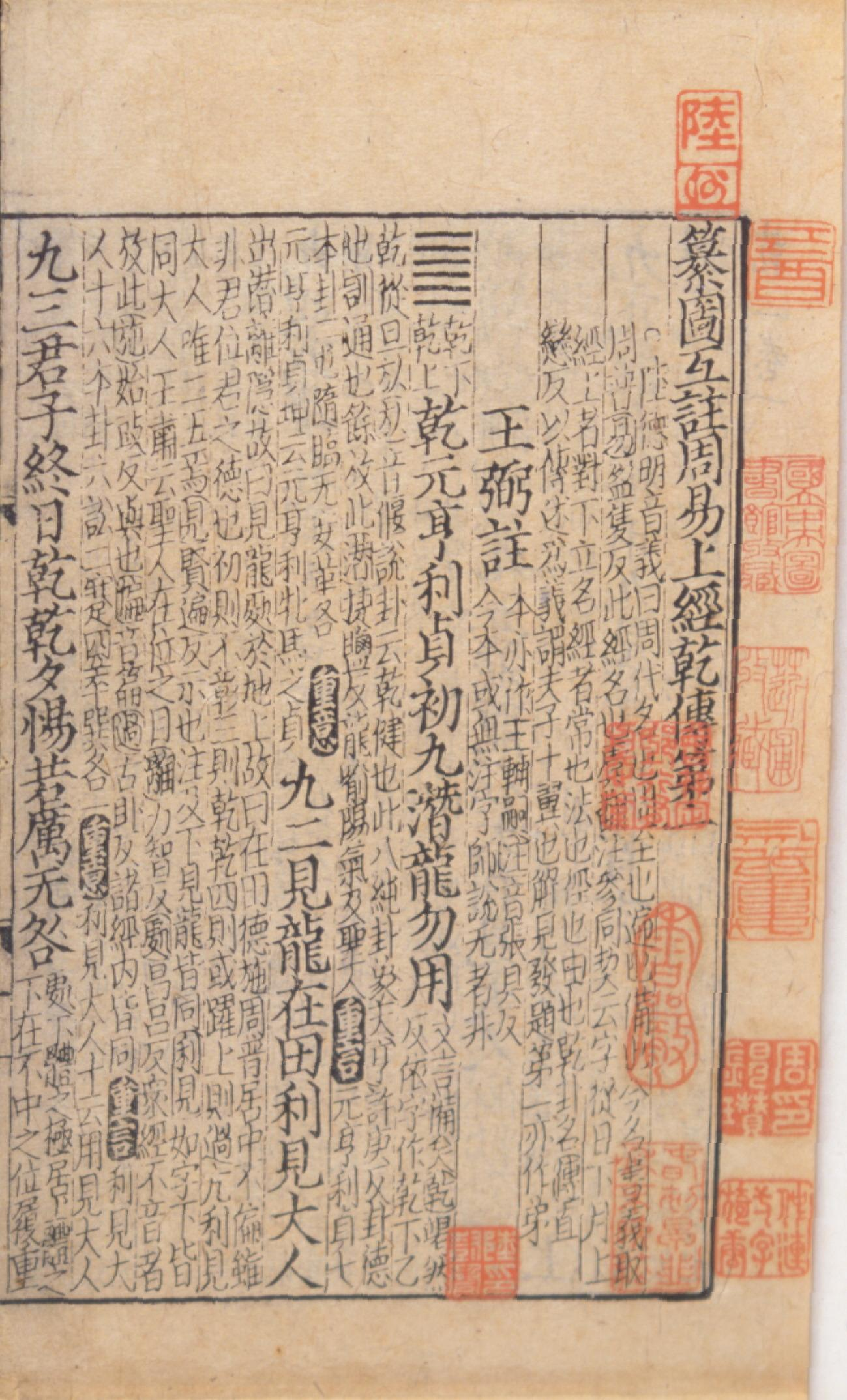
Nora consults the ancient, mystical Chinese divination text I Ching and records its synchronicities relating to her relationship with Javo.

Kerryn Goldsworthy writes that almost all of Garner's fiction addresses "the relationship between sexual behaviour and social organisation; the anarchic nature of desire and the orderly face of the institution of 'family'". The plot point of Nora's obsessive love for Javo is matched by Javo's addiction to heroin – although the source of obsession is different for both people, it possesses a similarly destructive power over a person.

Writer Jean-François Vernay opined in his book A Brief Take on the Australian Novel (2016) that though Garner was writing about a love affair, the novel, as well as the grunge literary genre it heralded, is not about love but rather "the disintegration of love", exploring the lives of alienated or romantically cynical city-dwellers who, in an attempt to escape the stressors and boredom of modern city life, indulge in reckless sexual behaviour which only provides them instant, short lived gratification over long-term meaningful, fulfilling couplings.

The book makes numerous references to the sacred Chinese divination text I Ching (translated in English as the Book of Changes), which Nora consults several times for guidance on her relationship with Javo, noting the synchronicities aligning with her life events. The I Ching's roots go back to mythical times, and comes in contemporary form from about 3000 B.C.

== Critical reception ==
Shouldn't a real writer be writing about something other than herself and her immediate circle? I've been haunted by this question since 1977 when a reviewer of Monkey Grip asked irritably what the fuss was about: as far as he could see, all I'd done was publish my diaries. I went round for years after that in a lather of defensiveness: "It's a novel, thank you very much". But I'm too old to bother with that crap any more. I might as well come clean. I did publish my diary. That's exactly what I did. I left out what I thought were the boring bits, wrote bridging passages, and changed all the names.

— Garner, on the critical reaction to the diaristic element to the novel

Monkey Grip initially met with a mixed reception in Australia. Some critics praised Garner's writing, including Peter Corris, who called the writing "attractive and accessible, a pleasure to read" and further commented "[Garner] has the ability to capture movement and stillness and light and sound with words which belong to writers like E. M. Forster and, to give a different but appropriate example, Jack Kerouac". Since its release it has come to be regarded as a classic of modern Australian literature.

In 1978, Garner was awarded the Book of the Year Award by the National Book Council for Monkey Grip – making her the first woman in Australia to win the award. The panel acknowledged that it was "not an easy choice", given that the book's subject matter included "heroin addiction, inner-city communal living and obsessional love". They further stated that the central character, Nora, is "superbly realised in her hesitancies and enthusiasms", that the book was "beautifully constructed", and that Garner had been "utterly honest in demonstrating the dilemmas of freedom, and particularly of social and sexual freedom for women trying to create for themselves a role which will recognise their full humanity".

The novel was released internationally in Europe and the United States in the late 1970s and early 1980s. It was met with a modest acclaim there – with the London Times writing "the actual force of the author's prose carries the novel along like a strong drink" and Vogue similarly praising the book for Garner's "deliberately laconic style", further stating she "renders her experiences with imagination to produce a novel that is chilling to read, cut and coloured with hard energy and strong feeling".

=== Legacy ===
When you look at when Helen came up – Melbourne in the 1970s – it’s probably accurate to say that she had no local Australian literary forebears. In a very real sense, she is an artistic orphan. I don’t consider that she has many – if any – peers in Australian literature, which is a lonely space, but it’s the flipside of her genius.

— Sarah Krasnostein

In 1980, Monkey Grip was serialised for the Melbourne community radio station 3RRR with Garner reading the entire text of the novel on air, herself.

It has been translated into several languages, including French and Italian. By the time of the release of the film adaptation, the novel had sold in excess of 100,000 copies. It has been taught in both high schools and universities.

In 2018, the book was voted number 47 on a list of 100 stories that changed the world, "stories they felt had shaped mindsets or influenced history", by a survey of 108 "critics, scholars and journalists" polled by the BBC. During that same year, it was republished in a fortieth anniversary hardcover edition by Text Publishing, with an introduction by Charlotte Wood. In 2026, ABC Radio ranked Monkey Grip as the 31st greatest Australian novel of all time, voted by Australian readers.

Helen Garner's Monkey Grip is an ABC TV documentary by writer and director Fiona Tuomy. The film explores the real people and events behind Helen Garner's groundbreaking debut novel Monkey Grip and the impact it had on Australia's artistic, political and cultural identity.

== Movie adaptation ==
In 1982, the novel was adapted to the film Monkey Grip directed by Ken Cameron from his own screenplay. The lead actors were Noni Hazlehurst as Nora and Colin Friels as Javo.
