= Cosmo Cosmolino =

Novel by Helen Garner

- First edition
- Author: Helen Garner
- Language: English
- Publisher: McPhee Gribble
- Publication date: 1992
- Publication place: Australia
- Media type: Print
- Pages: 221
- ISBN: 0747513449
- Preceded by: Postcards from Surfers (1985)
- Followed by: The First Stone (1994)

Cosmo Cosmolino is a 1992 book by Australian writer Helen Garner. The book consists of three linked works: two short stories and a novella, though the author and critics have described it as a novel.

It was first published in Australia by McPhee Gribble and was shortlisted for the 1993 Miles Franklin Award. It has been reported that the novel's title is Garner's favourite, and came to her in a dream.

== Short stories ==
In the first short story "Recording Angel", a woman goes to a hospital to see a gravely ill friend. In the second short story "A Vigil", a man is forced to see the cremation of his girlfriend who committed suicide.

== Novella ==
In the novella that gives the name to the book, freelance writer Janet owns a terrace house in Melbourne. The house was previously inhabited by a communal household.

== Critical reception ==
The novel was critically well received.
