= Honour & Other People's Children =

1980 collection of two short stories by Helen Garner

- First edition
- Author: Helen Garner
- Language: English
- Publisher: McPhee Gribble
- Publication date: 1980
- Publication place: Australia
- Media type: Print
- Pages: 156 p
- ISBN: 0-87223-742-7
- Preceded by: Monkey Grip (1977)
- Followed by: The Children's Bach (1984)

Honour & Other People's Children is a collection of two short stories–also described as novellas–by Australian writer Helen Garner. It was first published by McPhee Gribble in 1980. Garner's second published book, it was written while she lived in Paris, France. Australian literary critic Peter Craven described Garner's second published work as "less vigorous perhaps than Monkey Grip, but showing greater artistry."

== "Honour" ==
Honour is about the relationship between two people, separated but still legally married and with a child of the marriage, their ongoing friendship, and the changes to relationship when the former husband re-partners.

== "Other People's Children" ==
Other People's Children is about the disruption and end of relationship between two women, Scotty and Ruth, who live in a collective household. Scotty loves Ruth's daughter "as only the childless can love other people's children". Into Scotty's life comes Madigan, "a great lump of a fellow with yellow eyes, who bunched his thick fingers together in front of him when he entered a room".

== Reception ==
Honour & Other People's Children was well received both in Australia and internationally. The book was released in the United States in April 1982 and received an enthusiastic review in The New York Times, where Carolyn See wrote: "Helen Garner's Australia is a land both bucolic and exotic, a land of junkies and wallabies, of women's rights and outdoor plumbing, of homeless children in a beneficent atmosphere, of people looking up at night to see a thousand stars, a land where they jump on their bikes and ride through the warm, grass-scented evening air down to public parks without the slightest thought of being mugged. In other words - though it may be a shamelessly provincial way of perceiving it - the Australian world we see here is America in a time warp."
