= Everywhere I Look =

Everywhere I Look may refer to:

== Music ==
- "Everywhere I Look", a song on the 1990 Hall & Oates album Change of Season
- "Everywhere I Look", a song on the 1993 Phil Keaggy album Revelator
- "(Everywhere I Look) I See Your Face" a song on the 2006 Elastic No-No Band album The Very Best of Elastic No-No Band So Far
- "Everywhere I Look", a single by Midway Still

== Books ==
- Everywhere I Look (book), a collection of short works by Australian writer Helen Garner

== See also ==
- "Everywhere I Look, There's You", a song performed by Tamara Walker from the soundtrack to View from the Top
