= True Stories: Selected Non-Fiction =

1996 collection of short non-fiction works by Helen Garner

- First edition
- Author: Helen Garner
- Language: English
- Genre: Non-fiction
- Publisher: Text Publishing
- Publication date: 1996
- Publication place: Australia

True Stories: Selected Non-Fiction is a collection of short non-fiction works by Australian writer Helen Garner first published in 1996 by Text Publishing. The short works in the collection start with Garner's immediate notes as a school teacher to her journalist accounts of visiting a morgue and a maternity ward in a hospital. It won the 1997 Nita Kibble Literary Award.
