= Other People's Children =

Other People's Children may refer to:

- Other People's Children (TV series), a 2000 British television drama
- "Other People's Children" (General Hospital: Night Shift), a 2008 episode of the US TV series General Hospital: Night Shift
- "Other People's Children" (Modern Family), a 2014 episode from the TV series Modern Family
- Other People's Children (1958 film), a Georgian film
- Other People's Children (2015 film), an American film
- Other People's Children (2022 film), a French film by Rebecca Zlotowski
- "Honour & Other People's Children", two novellas by Australian author Helen Garner
