= Death of Joe Cinque =

Australian homicide

The death of Joe Cinque occurred in Canberra, Australian Capital Territory on 26 October 1997. Cinque's coffee was laced with rohypnol, a sedative, at a dinner party, after which he was injected with a lethal dose of heroin by his girlfriend Anu Singh, who was a law student at the Australian National University at the time. Singh was convicted in 1999 of manslaughter. She was sentenced to ten years' imprisonment, but was released early in 2001. Since her release, she has undertaken criminology research. The crime was portrayed in Helen Garner's non-fiction book Joe Cinque's Consolation (2004), which was later adapted into a film of the same name.

== Anu Singh ==
Anu Singh
- Born: 3 September 1972 (age 54); India
- Education: Australian National University; University of Sydney (MA, PhD)
- Criminal charge: Manslaughter of Joe Cinque
- Criminal penalty: 10 years' imprisonment, with the possibility of parole after 4 years
- Criminal status: Released

=== Early life ===
Anu Singh was born in Punjab, India, on 3 September 1972, to Indian Australian parents, Pradyumn "Paddy" and Surinder Singh, both doctors. The family emigrated from India to Sydney in 1973, when Singh was a baby, and settled in the suburb of Strathfield. Singh attended a Catholic high school in Newcastle, where she was the dux of year 10 in 1988. She graduated from high school in 1990, and moved to Canberra the following year to begin studying a double degree in Economics/Law at the Australian National University. Singh missed her life in Sydney, engaged in drug use while living in Canberra, and frequently called home to her parents. As a result, she deferred her studies for one year to return to her family in Sydney.

Singh's early life was relatively unremarkable, and her father said she was a "happy-go-lucky child", albeit one with some attachment problems, who gradually descended into mental illness in her twenties. According to Paddy Singh, Anu's problems escalated in 1995. Around that time, she had an affair with Joe Cinque. After Singh broke up with a boyfriend, Simon Walsh, as a result of her brief affair with Cinque, she began to use drugs daily, developed insomnia, and would pace the house at night. Singh's break-up with Walsh was referred to as a "significant life event" in the court transcripts of her trial.

During her relationship with Cinque, Singh was dieting excessively and would obsess about her weight. Her problems appeared to stabilise briefly during the early days of her relationship with Cinque, but soon returned after they moved in together. Her university attendance became sporadic, and on the rare occasion when she was seen by her peers, she appeared to be "dishevelled" and "poorly dressed", in contrast to her former generally immaculate and prideful dress sense.

== Singh-Cinque relationship ==
Joe Cinque and Anu Singh met in Newcastle, New South Wales in 1995. The following year, the couple were living together in Canberra while she was a law student at the Australian National University. During the 1998 trial, one of Singh's friends testified that she had been highly obsessed with her self-image, particularly her body, since 1991 and had briefly taken ipecac after Cinque mentioned it, something she was later angry with him for. Singh was also reportedly obsessed with fad diets and would spend hours working out at the gym—she had told friends "she'd rather be dead than fat". In May 1997, Singh told a friend that she wanted to kill several people, including Cinque, her ex-boyfriend Simon Walsh and her doctors.

=== Murder ===
Singh's close friend Madhavi Rao invited acquaintances to two dinner parties in October 1997 and told them that a crime would be committed. Witness Sanjeeva Tennekoon reported that the first dinner party on 24 October was normal and that Singh and Cinque appeared loving. However, another witness told the court that Rao had told her afterwards that Singh had tried to kill Cinque that evening but did not deliver a sufficient dose, and that the witness had threatened to go to the police. The day after the first dinner party, Singh and Rao went to a friend, Len Mancini, and told him they had given Cinque drugs the previous evening.

Cinque died on 26 October 1997, the morning after the second dinner party. Toxicology reports showed high levels of heroin and rohypnol in his body.

A witness claimed that Singh bought more heroin from a friend on the morning of 26 October. Singh called an ambulance for Cinque at 12:10pm on 26 October, and the ambulance officers found that he had suffered from cardiac arrest. Singh made it difficult for the ambulance to respond quickly, giving a false address. Singh told police at the scene that she had administered drugs to Cinque. Police reported that when they arrived at the scene, Singh was hysterical and struggled with police and ambulance officers when they took her away from Cinque's body.

=== Trial ===
Singh first appeared in court on 28 October 1997, charged with murder. She had told police that she had injected Cinque with heroin so that he would not interfere with a suicide attempt. Rao was charged with conspiracy to commit murder and released on bail on 5 November. The prosecutor noted that both Singh and Rao had been indiscreet about their actions. Singh applied for bail in December, and a psychiatrist presented evidence of a personality disorder. The prosecution pinpointed Singh as someone who embodied strong narcissistic traits.

Singh and Rao were tried jointly in October and November 1998, but this trial was aborted on 11 November, with Justice Ken Crispin saying that one of the pieces of evidence was problematic as it was unclear as to which of Singh or Rao it was admissible against. For the second trial, Singh elected to stand trial by judge alone, forgoing a jury. Justice Crispin ruled that Singh and Rao should be tried separately in the interest of fairness.

"There's no rational motivation at all. I was mentally unwell, and I still grapple with that. I still grapple with the whys. One of the psychiatrists mentioned a state of disassociation, perhaps, like disassociated from reality. I don't know. There’s no rational explanation."
—Singh, speaking in 2016

In her 1999 trial, Singh's defence presented evidence that she was mentally ill and had diminished responsibility, proposing an insanity defense. The court was told that Singh believed she was dying from a muscle wasting disease, complained of "not being able to feel her head on her body" and was bulimic. The prosecutors called an expert witness to testify that Singh had appeared rational and assertive on the night she was arrested. On 23 April Justice Crispin found Singh guilty of manslaughter and the following day sentenced her to ten years' imprisonment with a minimum four-year non-parole period. Cinque's mother was deeply unhappy with the short sentence. In Rao's second trial, she was charged with murder, manslaughter, attempted murder, and administering a stupefying drug and was acquitted of all charges.

Singh was released on parole in October 2001 after four years imprisonment, including time she had served on remand since 1997. She was returned to jail in April 2004 after breaching her parole conditions by smoking marijuana and re-released on 5 August 2004 after challenging her re-imprisonment on a technicality.

=== After release ===
Singh completed a master's degree in criminology at Sydney University, having attended classes on day release from Emu Plains Correctional Centre.

In June 2005, concern was expressed in the New South Wales Parliament about Singh's employment with the Cabramatta Community Centre. The public was reassured that Singh was not employed to distribute clean injecting equipment and that her employment was on a time-limited project.

In 2010, Singh began research at the University of Sydney Faculty of Law, and in 2012 was awarded a doctorate for her thesis Offending Women: Toward a Greater Understanding of Women's Pathways Into and Out of Crime in Australia. It outlines "five major pathways that led [female prisoners] to crime: unstable upbringings, sexual and physical abuse, drug use, economic marginality and, mental illness". An edited version was released as a self-published e-book in 2016.

== In literature and other adaptations ==
External audio
- "Joe Cinque is Dead", Late Night Live interviews with Singh and Cinque's parents, first broadcast 23 September 2004

The crime has been adapted into works by several authors and filmmakers. The best-known example is Helen Garner's 2004 book Joe Cinque's Consolation, published in the same month as Singh's re-release from prison, which was a widely publicised account of Singh's crime and trial, together with the Cinque family's response to it. Singh gave interviews shortly after the release of the book, recounting her own memories of the killing and expressing regret at rejecting Garner's request for an interview. She told interviewers that she wished to redress some of the book's imbalance towards her.

In 2012, it was announced that Garner's book would be turned into a film to be directed by Canberran Sotiris Dounoukos. Dounoukos was at ANU studying law at the same time as Singh; she was "a friend of friends". The film was partially funded by Screen Australia. The film, also called Joe Cinque's Consolation, was given a cinematic release on 13 October 2016 to generally positive critical attention. Singh was portrayed by actress Maggie Naouri, while Cinque was portrayed by Jerome Meyer.

The Quakers a novel by Rachel Hennessy was published in 2008. It won the Adelaide Festival Award for an Unpublished Manuscript and was launched at Writers' Week in February 2008. The manuscript was also short-listed for the Varuna Writers' Centre Manuscript Development program and won the ArtsSA prize for Creative Writing. The book has been described as 'a fictionalised life of her [Hennessy's] high-school classmate Anu Singh' by Susan Wyndham.

Other works based on the death of Cinque include:

- In 2005, a documentary was being made about Singh by James Ricketson which covered her employment in Cabramatta. The documentary was reportedly to be called Atonement.
- Criminology, a play by Tom Wright and Lally Katz, performed at Melbourne's Malthouse Theatre in August 2007.
- The Dinner Party, a psychological thriller film starring Lara Cox, released in 2009 and produced by SilverSun Pictures, a video, TV and film production company in Canberra.
- Deadly Women and Crimes That Shook Australia.
- The case was covered by True Crime Island in July 2018.
- The case was also covered in November 2019 by Casefile True Crime.
