= The Season (Garner book) =

2025 book by Helen Garner

- Author: Helen Garner
- Subject: Biography & Autobiography
- Publisher: Text Publishing
- Publication date: 26 November 2024
- Pages: 208
- ISBN: 9781922790750

The Season is a 2024 non-fiction work by Australian writer Helen Garner. The book follows the progress of her grandson's Australian rules football junior team, observing them at training sessions and at games. In the book, Garner writes that she started following the Western Bulldogs after watching the 1997 documentary Year of the Dogs.
