= Debra Adelaide =

Australian novelist, writer and academic (born 1958)

- Born: 1958 (age 67–68); Sydney, New South Wales, Australia
- Education: University of Sydney
- Occupations: Writer and academic
- Employer: University of Technology Sydney
- Writing career
- Language: English
- Years active: 1988–
- Notable awards: Steele Rudd Award

Debra Adelaide (born 1958) is an Australian novelist, writer and academic. She teaches creative writing at the University of Technology Sydney.

== Biography ==
Adelaide was born in Sydney and grew up in the Sutherland Shire. A contemporary of writers Kathy Lette and Gabrielle Carey, she attended Gymea High School and then, via a teacher's scholarship, she completed a BA (Honours) and MA (Honours) in English literature at the University of Sydney. She then completed a PhD in Australian women's literature in 1991 there, and in the process completed her first book, a bibliography of Australian women's literature.

While studying, Adelaide worked as a university tutor and research assistant, and afterwards became a freelance editor, author and book reviewer. She commenced writing fiction in the early 1990s and her first novel, The Hotel Albatross, was published in 1995.

She is currently an associate professor in creative practice at the University of Technology Sydney, where she teaches in the undergraduate communication program and teaches and supervises postgraduate creative writing.

She was married until 2003 and has three children.

== Works ==
Adelaide has published novels, anthologies and reference books on Australian literature. Her novels are: The Household Guide to Dying (Picador, 2008), The Hotel Albatross (Vintage, 1995) and Serpent Dust (Vintage, 1998). She has published two collections of short fiction, entitled Zebra: and other stories (Picador, 2019) and Letter to George Clooney (Picador: 2013) and also contributed to and edited the anthology Acts of Dogs (Vintage, 2003) in which leading Australian and New Zealand authors have written stories and memoirs on the theme of dogs, and the Motherlove series of anthologies (Random House, 1996; 1997; 1998).

Zebra won the 2019 University of Southern Queensland Steele Rudd Award for a Short Story Collection.

== Bibliography ==
=== Novels ===
- The Hotel Albatross (1995)
- Serpent Dust (1998)
- The Household Guide to Dying (2008)
- The Women's Pages (2015)

=== Short stories ===
- Letter to George Clooney (2013)
- Zebra (2019)

=== Non-fiction ===
- Australian Women Writers: A Bibliographic Guide (Pandora Press, 1988)
- The Innocent Reader: Reflections on Reading and Writing (2019)
- When I Am Sixty-Four. University of Queensland Press. April 2026. ISBN 9780702271168. Autofiction about her friendship with, and the death of, Gabrielle Carey.

=== As editor ===
- A Window in the Dark (1991). Autobiography of Dymphna Cusack
- Motherlove: Stories About Births, Babies and Beyond (1996)
- Motherlove 2: More Stories About Births, Babies and Beyond (1997)
- A Bright and Fiery Troop: Australian Women Writers of the Nineteenth Century (1998)
- Cutting the Cord: Stories of Children, Love and Loss (1998)
- Acts of Dog: Writers on the Canine Divine (2003)
- The Simple Act of Reading (2015)

== Awards ==
Year	Work	Prize	Category	Result	Ref
2014	Letter to George Clooney	Nita Kibble Literary Awards	Nita B Kibble Literary Award	Shortlisted	
2014	Letter to George Clooney	Stella Prize	—	Longlisted	
2016	The Women's Pages	Nita Kibble Literary Awards	Nita B Kibble Literary Award	Lonlisted	
2016	The Women's Pages	Stella Prize	—	Longlisted	
2019	Zebra	Queensland Literary Awards	Steele Rudd Award	Won	
