= Sarah Armstrong (writer) =

Australian journalist and novelist

- Born: 1968 (age 57–58); Sydney, New South Wales, Australia
- Occupations: journalist and novelist
- Known for: Salt Rain

Sarah Armstrong (born 1968) is an Australian journalist and novelist. Over an eight-year period she worked for the ABC on radio programs including AM, PM and The World Today where she won a Walkley Award in 1993.

In 2005, her first novel Salt Rain won the Dobbie Encouragement Award, and was shortlisted for the Miles Franklin Award and the Queensland Premier's Literary Awards.

Armstrong's 2025 novel, Run, won the Davitt Award for Children's Novel and was shortlisted for the Children's Book of the Year Award: Younger Readers in 2026.

== Novels ==
- Salt Rain, 2004
- His Other House, 2015
- Promise, 2016
- Big Magic, 2022
- Magic Awry, 2023
- Run, 2025
- The Wave, 2026
