= Kathleen Stewart =

Australian writer

- Born: 1958 (age 67–68); Sydney, Australia
- Occupation: Novelist
- Writing career
- Genres: General fiction, poetry

Kathleen Stewart (born 1958 Sydney) is an Australian writer. She has written eight novels, and published two books of poetry. Her novel Spilt Milk was shortlisted for the NSW Premier's Award, and her memoir The After Life was shortlisted for the Nita Kibble Literary Award. Her novel Men of Bad Character was published by the University of Queensland Press in June, 2010.

== Personal life ==
She currently lives in the Blue Mountains of Australia.

== Publications ==
- Men of Bad Character (2010) ISBN 978-0-7022-3773-7
- The After Life: A memoir (2008) ISBN 978-1-74166-727-1
- The Black Butterfly (2001) ISBN 978-1-86508-560-9
- The Red Room (1999) ISBN 978-1-86508-313-1
- The White Star (1997) ISBN 1-86330-630-7
- Nightflowers (1996) ISBN 1-86330-559-9
- Spilt Milk (1995) ISBN 1-86330-393-6
- Snow (1994) ISBN 0-85561-516-8
- Louis: A Normal Novel (1993) ISBN 1-86330-233-6
- The Victim Train (1992) ISBN 1-86330-183-6

== Awards and nominations ==
- 2009 - Nita Kibble Literary Award, shortlisted for The After Life: A memoir
- 1995 - NSW Premier's Award, shortlisted for Spilt Milk
- 1994 - The Age Book of the Year Award, shortlisted for Snow
- 1994 - National Book Council Banjo Award for Poetry, shortlisted for Snow
