= Robert Farquharson =

Australian convict

- Born: Robert Donald William Farquharson; 1969 (age 56–57); Australia
- Spouse: Cindy Gambino (divorced) (deceased)
- Children: 3 (deceased; victims)
- Status: Found guilty
- Criminal charge: Three counts of murder
- Penalty: Sentenced to life imprisonment with a 33-year minimum

Details
- Victims: 3
- Country: Australia
- State: Victoria
- Killed: 3
- Weapons: Car, dam
- Date apprehended: 14 December 2005

Robert Donald William Farquharson (born 1969) is an Australian man convicted of murdering his three sons on 4 September 2005, by deliberately driving his car into a farm dam.

Farquharson was convicted in an earlier trial and was sentenced to life imprisonment with no minimum term. However, he maintained his innocence and appealed his sentence. On 17 December 2009, he won the right to a retrial, due in part to the key witness for the prosecution, Greg King, facing potential criminal charges himself at the time of the original trial. He was released on bail on 21 December, but was again convicted of murder on 22 July 2010.

Helen Garner published This House of Grief (2014) as a response to the crime and the ensuing trials, in which Farquharson is heavily depicted.

== Early life ==
The deceased Farquharson children, Jai, 10, Bailey, 2, Tyler, 7

Farquharson met Cindy Gambino in February 1990 and the two began a relationship. Gambino had previously been in a relationship with a man who was killed in a car accident. In October 1994, their first son Jai was born. In 1996, Farquharson took a redundancy package from his employer and bought a lawn-mowing franchise servicing his local area, a venture which lost him A$40,000.

In July 1998, their second son, Tyler, was born and in 2000, Farquharson married Gambino. They then had another son, Bailey, in December 2002 before the pair separated amicably in 2004. Farquharson had avoidant personality disorder and bouts of depression, and sought the assistance of a psychologist and later a psychiatrist to deal with the separation. He was prescribed the antidepressants sertraline and later mirtazapine.

== Drownings ==
About 7 pm on 4 September 2005, as Farquharson was returning his children to their mother after a Father's Day access visit, his white 1989 VN Commodore vehicle veered across the Princes Highway between Winchelsea and Geelong, in Victoria, crashed through a fence and came to rest in a 7.4-metre-deep disused former quarry turned farm dam where it filled with water and submerged. His three sons were unable to free themselves and drowned. Farquharson managed to escape and alerted another driver who took him to nearby Winchelsea. Police divers recovered the boys' bodies about 2 am the next day. They were still inside the vehicle and were not restrained by seatbelts.

After a three-month investigation, police prepared murder charges against Farquharson and went to his Winchelsea home on 14 December 2005. He was not there at the time but presented himself at the Geelong police station in the presence of his lawyer. He was arrested and charged with three counts of murder. He had previously requested and undertook a lie detector test, the results of which were inadmissible in court. He later appeared in the Geelong Magistrates Court, where he was remanded in custody and ordered to appear before the court on 7 April 2006.

== Trial ==
Police alleged that Farquharson was in control of the vehicle in the moments before it crashed into the dam and that he earlier told a friend, Greg King, that he had intended to kill his children to get back at his wife. He was later granted bail and released from custody.

Farquharson's trial for the murder of his sons began in the Supreme Court of Victoria, before Justice Philip Cummins, on 21 August 2007. A total of 49 witnesses appeared during the six-week trial.

Gambino told the court that she did not believe Farquharson intended to kill their children deliberately, saying "I believe with all my heart that this was just an accident and that he would not have hurt a hair on their heads. I don't believe this is murder."

=== Prosecution ===
Sergeant Glen Urquhart gave evidence that the steering wheel of Farquharson's vehicle would require a 220-degree turn to veer as it did on the highway to leave the road. There was no evidence of braking before the car entered the dam. The vehicle's headlights, heater and ignition system were all in the off position.

The body of the oldest child, Jai, was found protruding halfway out of the vehicle's front door. The other boys were discovered in the back seat.

Police video re-enactments of the crime scene played before the court showed the car veering left, instead of right, towards the dam at the exact position on the highway the accident happened. Farquharson's car was found to pull slightly to the right, though not to the degree that would counteract the left-veering force according to Urquhart.

King, a bus driver, testified that he recalled a conversation with Farquharson two months before the incident outside a fish and chip shop. He said his friend spoke of seeking revenge on his former wife and of wanting to "take away the things that mean the most to her", meaning the children. King recalled Farquharson complaining how his wife had taken the newer of the two cars. But King's wife could not recall her husband relaying this conversation to her that day.

Another witness, Shane Atkinson, who discovered Farquharson on the side of the road, said Farquharson twice refused to call the 000 emergency number, preferring instead to travel to Winchelsea to tell his wife of his children's fate. The court transcript reveals Atkinson had to borrow a mobile phone to call police from the Winchelsea police station, which was closed for the night. This backs up the evidence given originally at the committal hearing that no mobile phone was available.

Matthew Naughton, an associate professor and specialist in sleep and respiratory medicine, told the jury that it was highly unlikely Farquharson had had a coughing fit in the moments before the accident. He further testified that coughing to the point of blacking out is an extremely rare condition, known as cough syncope, and that Farquharson was unlikely to have had such an attack while driving given the warmth of his vehicle. He later conceded, however, that he had never seen cough syncope, would not know how to take a history to determine it and was skeptical even of its existence, a consideration not backed up by others in the same sphere of medicine.

=== Defence ===
Farquharson relied upon the defence of losing consciousness due to a coughing fit and told police that he woke up in the dam. He said that the car had begun to submerge when his son Jai tried to free himself by opening the passenger door.

Cam Everett, the owner of the property where the dam was located, told the court that a total of seven vehicles had crashed through his farm fence in eight years. No vehicles other than Farquharson's had ended up in the dam in that time.

Former police superintendent David Axup, who had been in the police force for over 20 years, contradicted the prosecution's arguments about the path and steering of the car as it left the road, believing it had probably travelled on a 53-degree arc. He said this could be explained by the right camber of the road towards the dam as well as the fact that the car had poor wheel alignment, meaning it would move uncontrolled to the right.

Farquharson's thoracic medicine specialist, Chris Steinfort, also concluded it was "highly likely" that his patient had cough syncope on the night. Steinfort has seen cases of cough syncope and believed the symptoms experienced by Farquharson were a "classic" example.

=== Verdict ===
The day before the verdict came in, Farquharson arranged for flowers (three red tulips) to be laid at the grave of his children. Attached was a card reading "Dear Jai, Thinking of you on your birthday. Love you, Dad." Jai would have turned 13 that day.

After three days of deliberations, the jury found Farquharson guilty on 5 October 2007. Gambino broke down in court when the verdict was announced; her mother collapsed and was taken to hospital by ambulance. Justice Cummins allowed a recess of 15 minutes for the court to compose itself before proceedings resumed.

On 16 November 2007, Farquharson was sentenced to three terms of life imprisonment without parole. He then announced that he intended to appeal his convictions.

== Appeal, bail and retrial ==
On 17 December 2009, Farquharson's conviction was unanimously overturned by the three appeal judges. They were critical of the trial judge, the prosecution and the evidence of key prosecution witness Greg King. On 21 December, he was granted bail and released into the care of one of his sisters with AU$200,000 surety.

The retrial commenced on 4 May 2010 before Justice Lex Lasry QC. The jury retired to consider their verdict on 19 July after hearing 11 weeks of evidence and argument. On 22 July, after three days of deliberation, the second jury again found Farquharson guilty of murder. On 15 October 2010, he was sentenced to life imprisonment with a 33-year minimum.

== Media ==
Gambino told her story to Australian magazine Woman's Day, saying that she did not believe Farquharson had killed their children, but later changed her mind. Harpo Productions, the company of American talk show host Oprah Winfrey, was reported to have offered Gambino $1 million to appear on the programme and tell her story. Cindy Gambino-Moules, as she was known after her remarriage, died at age 50 in May 2022.

Three books have also been written on the case, which contrast sharply in their perspectives and conclusions:

- On Fathers Day (2013) by Megan Norris, who spent time with Cindy Gambino, presents the prosecution version of the evidence;
- This House of Grief (2014) by Helen Garner, who sat through both trials, provides a "thirteenth juror" version of the evidence;
- Road to Damnation (2020) by Chris Brook, who had access to all the case materials and takes a scientific perspective of the evidence.

The case was also covered in detail by Casefile True Crime Podcast in Case 167 released on 6 March 2021, and in True Crime Conversations later in the same year, with the two podcasts presenting contrasting perspectives.

In 2024, two new programmes were released seriously challenging the evidence presented for conviction, suggesting that the second conviction was also based upon a thorough mistreatment of the evidence.

60 Minutes Australia, in an episode hosted by Nick McKenzie, spoke to numerous experts, most prominently Anna-Maria Arabia, chief executive of the Australian Academy of Science, while questioning much of the evidence presented by the prosecution.

Some of the new evidence presented by 60 Minutes, in particular the computer modelling of the crash, was done after the road involved had been considerably altered by upgrades made to it in the intervening period.

The 60 Minutes piece was prompted by a joint investigation done by The Age and the Sydney Morning Herald, whose five part podcast, Trial By Water, also questions whether or not Farquharson was unfairly convicted.

No firm conclusions regarding the events of 4 September 2005 were reached by either of the 2024 reviews; rather, questions were raised as to whether or not Farquharson had received a fair trial, or if in fact the conviction should again be revisited.

== See also ==
- Arthur Freeman
- John Sharpe
- Greg Anderson
- Rowan Baxter
- Susan Smith
- Diane Downs
- Joshua Powell
- József Barsi
