= The Beloved (novel) =

Book by Annah Faulkner

- Author: Annah Faulkner
- Language: English
- Publisher: Picador, Australia
- Publication date: 2012
- Publication place: Australia
- English publication date: 1 July 2012
- Media type: Print Paperback
- Pages: 313
- ISBN: 9781742611556
- Followed by: Last Day in the Dynamite Factory

The Beloved (2012) is a novel by Australian author Annah Faulkner. It won the 2013 Nita Kibble Literary Award.

== Book summary ==
Roberta (Bertie) Lightfoot moves from post-war Melbourne and Sydney in the 1950s to post-colonial frontier town, Port Moresby. One day she discovers she has polio and the novel follows her long road to recovery and the subsequent discovery of her gifts as a painter.

== Reviews ==
"Readings" bookstore called the novel "Tender and witty, The Beloved is a moving debut novel which paints a vivid portrait of both the beauty and the burden of unconditional love."

Mary Anne Elliott, reviewing the novel in The Northern Star stated: "Faulkner's engaging and evocative narrative never falters; it is by turns wise, witty and completely delightful."

== Awards ==
- 2011 winner Queensland Premier's Literary Awards — Best Manuscript of an Emerging Queensland Author
- 2013 shortlisted Miles Franklin Award
- 2013 winner Kibble Literary Awards — Nita Kibble Literary Award
