= The Feel of Steel =

Book by Helen Garner

- First edition
- Author: Helen Garner
- Publisher: Picador Australia
- Publication date: 2001
- ISBN: 0 330 36289 5
- Dewey Decimal: A828.309

The Feel of Steel is a 2001 collection of short non-fiction works by Australian writer Helen Garner. The 31 works in the collection include long narratives and very short pieces were described by reviewer Evelyn Juers as "delicate haiku-like sketches with a faint stitch of narrative". It has been described as "a collection of pieces reflecting on her life and that of her loved ones." In an interview in 2000 in The Guardian, Garner identified Leslie Fadgyas as the fencing teacher who had taught her both as a schoolgirl and as an adult.
