= Postcards from Surfers =

Collected works by Helen Garner

- First edition
- Author: Helen Garner
- Language: English
- Genre: Short story collection
- Publisher: McPhee Gribble/Penguin
- Publication date: 1985
- Publication place: Australia
- Media type: Print
- Pages: 106 pp.
- Awards: 1986 Christina Stead Prize for Fiction, winner
- ISBN: 0140084622

Postcards from Surfers is a collection of short works by Australian writer Helen Garner published in 1985.

The book won the 1986 New South Wales Premier's Literary Awards "Christina Stead Prize for Fiction". The stories in the collection have been described as "largely about miscommunication, impossible love, and the accidental hurt we cause each other when we interact." Most of the short works in Postcards from Surfers have been included in a 2017 anthology of Garner's short fiction simply called Stories.
