= Joe Cinque's Consolation (film) =

2016 film

- Theatrical release poster
- Directed by: Sotiris Dounoukos
- Screenplay by: Sotiris Dounoukos; Matt Rubinstein
- Based on: Joe Cinque's Consolation by Helen Garner
- Produced by: Sotiris Dounoukos; Matt Reeder
- Starring: Maggie Naouri; Jerome Meyer
- Cinematography: Simon Chapman
- Edited by: Angelos Angelidis; Martin Connor
- Music by: Antonio Gambale
- Distributed by: Titan View
- Release date: 30 July 2016 (Melbourne IFF)
- Running time: 102 minutes
- Country: Australia
- Language: English

Joe Cinque's Consolation is a 2016 Australian drama film directed by Sotiris Dounoukos based on the book of the same name by Helen Garner. It concerns the increasingly fraught relationship between an engineer, Joe, and his narcissistic law student girlfriend Anu in Canberra in the mid 1990s. As Anu's mental state deteriorates, she conjures up a macabre plan to put an end to her suffering. The film was given a national cinema release in October 2016 and has received a generally positive response from critics.

Joe Cinque's Consolation was recognised at the 2016 AACTA Awards when Maggie Naouri was nominated in the category of Best Actress.

== Plot ==
Anu Singh, an Australian National University student, drugged her boyfriend Joe Cinque's coffee with Rohypnol and injected him with heroin in 1997. The other guests of the dinner party in which this incident took place were aware of the murder plot and yet nobody warned him.

== Cast ==
- Maggie Naouri as Anu Singh
- Jerome Meyer as Joe Cinque
- Sacha Joseph as Madhavi Rao
- Josh McConville as Chris
- Gia Carides as Maria Cinque
- Tony Nikolakopoulos as Nino Cinque
- Jacob Collins-Levy as Saul
- Laura Gordon as Tanya
- Jackson Tozer as Len Mancini
- Eva Lazzaro as Bronwyn
- Lara Schwerdt as Sarah
- Arka Das as Sanjeeva

== Production ==
The film was shot over a 6-week period, beginning in April 2015. Shooting took place around the city of Canberra. It received financial support from Screen Australia and the Australian Capital Territory Government. Screen Australia paid a $13,000 feature film development grant that was approved in May 2012. The ACT Government's contribution of $16,220, paid through the ACT Screen Arts Fund, was to assist with mentoring support for Dounoukos during key phases of the film's production.

== Release ==
The film's world premiere was at the 2016 Melbourne International Film Festival, where the festival's Artistic Director Michelle Carey said "Seeing Joe Cinque's Consolation was one of the most visceral experiences I’ve had in a long time." It was also selected to be screened in the Discovery section at the 2016 Toronto International Film Festival. It was released nationally in cinemas across Australia on 13 October 2016. Joe Cinque's Consolation grossed $224,868 at the Australian box office, making it the tenth highest grossing Australian film of 2016. It was released on DVD and digital download in March 2017. The film premiered on Australian television on the Special Broadcasting Service (SBS) on Friday 20 October 2017.

== Critical response ==
On Rotten Tomatoes the film has an approval rating of 75% based on reviews from 16 critics.

Reviewing the film for The Sydney Morning Herald, Paul Byrne wrote that it was intriguing in dramatic terms, "but not entirely satisfying". Reviewing for The Guardian, Luke Buckmaster gave the film two stars, describing its adaptation of the book as "one Herculean stretch" but also "level-headed, a sobering portrait of a tragedy intentionally bereft of narrative bells and whistles.".

Academic Dirk de Bruyn found the film engaging, and called it "mature and intelligent", and "riveting Australian cinema". Rochelle Siemienowicz praised elements of the film's cinematography, and wrote that the mentality of the times was captured realistically, while lamenting that the dialogue delivered by Sacha Joseph as Madhavi Rao made the character seem robotic. Sandra Hall wrote that Joe Cinque is the only comprehensible character in the film, giving it three stars.

Richard Kuipers, writing for Variety in North America, gave a positive review: "[The film] offers a moody and compelling study of the facts while leaving audiences to draw their own conclusions to the burning question of why people would act like this". He went on to praise the performances by the two leads, as well as the technical details of the film, particularly the cinematography and score, stating: "Cinematographer Simon Chapman contrasts his warm lensing of intimate scenes with deliberately plain imagery of Canberra’s flat and uninteresting suburban landscape. Antonio Gambale's fine score slides nicely from bouncy rhythms in early, happy times to brooding soundscapes as Singh’s monstrous plan takes shape. All other tech work is solid."

Writing in The Hollywood News, Jazmine Sky Bradley gave the film four stars, saying it was "a gripping true crime drama not to miss". Richard Gray at The Reel Bits gave it 4½ stars and described it as "a complex love story, a plot for murder and an intense character study". Reviewing the film for the ABC, Jason Di Rosso found that "the film's unsettling power lies in the question it poses about active and passive responsibility" and called it "a dark and thought-provoking film that will linger with you long after the credits roll.”

Australian author Christos Tsiolkas praised the film in The Saturday Paper, writing that "the great strength of the film is in its quiet purposefulness", and that "though it pivots on a different set of questions to those that animate Garner’s book, they are both works of scrupulousness and integrity". Forensic psychiatrist Dr Russ Scott examined the legal and psychological aspects of the film in Psychiatry, Psychology and Law, praising the film's "prodigious research", "accomplished direction" and "strong performances" and concluding that "Joe Cinque’s Consolation, superbly acted and exquisitely nuanced, stands out as an example of Australian cinema at its very best."

=== Accolades ===
Maggie Naouri was nominated for Best Actress at the 6th AACTA Awards, but lost to Odessa Young for The Daughter.
