= Annah Faulkner =

Australian novelist (1949/1950 – 2022)

- Born: 1949 or 1950; Melbourne, Victoria, Australia
- Died: 8 March 2022 (aged 72)
- Occupation: Novelist
- Writing career
- Language: English
- Years active: 2011–2022
- Notable work: The Beloved
- Notable awards: Nita Kibble Literary Award, 2013

Annah Faulkner (1949/1950 – 8 March 2022) was an Australian novelist.

At the age of five, Faulkner moved with her parents to Papua New Guinea and later lived on Queensland's Sunshine Coast with her husband. She died in March 2022, after leaving a note arguing for more humane death laws permitting access to suicide for older Australians.

== Bibliography ==
=== Novels ===
- The Beloved (2011)
- Last Day in the Dynamite Factory (2015)

== Awards ==
- 2011 winner Queensland Premier's Literary Awards for Best Manuscript of an Emerging Queensland Author
- 2013 shortlisted Miles Franklin Literary Award for The Beloved
- 2013 winner Nita Kibble Literary Award for The Beloved

== Interviews ==
- Karen Hardy in The Sydney Morning Herald, 27 June 2015, on the publication of the author's second novel
- John Purcell on Booktopia, "Annah Faulkner, author of The Beloved, answers Ten Terrifying Questions"
