= Kathryn Heyman =

Australian writer of novels and plays

Kathryn Heyman is an Australian writer of novels and plays. She is the director of the Australian Writers Mentoring Program and the Fiction Program Director of Faber Writing Academy.

== Career ==
Born in New South Wales, Australia, she was brought up in Lake Macquarie with her four siblings.

As a young adult Heyman spent many years in the United Kingdom, where she studied under the Caribbean poet E.A. Markham, and where she was first published.

Heyman is the author of six novels: The Breaking (1997), Keep Your Hands on the Wheel (1999), The Accomplice (2003) Captain Starlight's Apprentice (2006) Floodline (2013) and Storm and Grace (2017) She is also a playwright for theatre and radio and has held a number of creative writing fellowships in the UK and Australia. Her short stories have appeared in a number of collections and also on radio.

Heyman's first novel, The Breaking, was longlisted for the Orange Prize, and shortlisted for the Scottish Writer of the Year Award. Her third, The Accomplice, won an Arts Council England Writer's Award and was shortlisted for the Western Australian Premier's Book Awards. The Accomplice is a fictional account of the wreck of the Dutch flagship the Batavia off the Australian coast in the 17th century. As a meditation on complicity with evil it has been compared with the work of Joseph Conrad and William Golding.

Her fourth novel, Captain Starlight's Apprentice, features a woman bushranger, the birth (and near death) of the Australian film industry, and a British migrant to Australia who undergoes electroconvulsive therapy. In 2007 the novel was shortlisted for the Nita Kibble Literary Award.

Floodline, published 2013, is set during the aftermath of a great flood, and has been compared with the writing of Cormac McCarthy. Heyman's writing has also been compared with that of Angela Carter, David Malouf, Peter Carey and Kate Grenville.

Heyman's sixth novel Storm & Grace, a psychological thriller about freediving, deals with violence against women and was published by Allen & Unwin in February 2017.

Heyman's work has appeared on BBC Radio 4, and a five-part dramatic adaptation of Captain Starlight's Apprentice was broadcast on Woman's Hour in April 2007. In 2013 she delivered the NSW Premier's Literary Awards keynote address.

== Books ==
- The Breaking. Phoenix House (1997); Allen & Unwin (2012) ISBN 9781743314944
- Keep Your Hands on the Wheel. Phoenix House (1999); Allen & Unwin (2012) ISBN 9781743315354
- The Accomplice. Hodder Headline (2003); Allen & Unwin (2012) ISBN 9781743314357
- Captain Starlight's Apprentice. Hodder Headline (2006); Allen & Unwin (2012) ISBN 9781743313978
- Floodline. Allen & Unwin (2013) ISBN 9781743312797
- Storm & Grace. Allen & Unwin (2017) ISBN 9781743313633
- Fury. Allen & Unwin (2021) ISBN 9781760529376

== Plays ==
- The Princess Who Couldn't Fly (and a Word or Two About the Crippled King) (1990)
- Unreal (1991)
- Sex, Lies and Model Aeroplanes (1991) with David Lennie and Paul Tolton
- Exodus (1993) with David Purveur
- Dancing on the Word (1993)
- That's The Way to Do It (1994) with Jo Enright

== Works for BBC Radio ==
- Far Country (2002), starring Kerry Fox
- Keep Your Hands on the Wheel (2003), starring Kerry Fox
- Moonlight's Boy (2005)
- Closing Time (2005), (BBC short)
- Captain Starlight's Apprentice (2007)

== Awards ==
- Adelaide Festival Awards for Literature Nonfiction Award shortlist, 2022 (Fury)
- Australia Council Established Writers New Work Grant 2006 – 2008
- Kibble Prize shortlist, (Captain Starlight's Apprentice)
- Arts Council of England Writer's Award, (The Accomplice)
- Western Australian Premier's Book Awards shortlist, (The Accomplice)
- Wingate Scholarship, (The Accomplice)
- Southern Arts Writers Award (Keep Your Hands on the Wheel)
- Orange Prize longlist, (The Breaking)
- Stakis Prize for Scottish Writer of the Year shortlist, (The Breaking)
- Hallam Poetry Prize, 1996
