= Di Gribble =

Australian publisher (1942– 2011)

Di Gribble AM
- Born: Diana Mary Glenn; 13 April 1942; Melbourne, Victoria, Australia
- Died: 4 October 2011 (aged 69); Melbourne, Victoria, Australia
- Occupations: Publisher, editor, businessperson
- Known for: McPhee Gribble; Text Media Group; Private Media
- Spouses: John Gribble (dis.); Les Kossatz (d. Feb. 2011)
- Children: Anna Gribble
- Parent: Sir Archibald Glenn

Diana Mary Gribble AM (13 April 1942 – 4 October 2011) was an Australian publisher, book editor and businessperson. A feminist, Gribble was one of the most influential figures in the Australian publishing scene and wider cultural life between 1975 and 2010.

== Biography ==
Gribble was born in Melbourne, Australia, the daughter of Sir Archibald Glenn and Betty Balderstone. Educated at Fintona Girls' School, she began studying architecture at the University of Melbourne, where she met Hilary McPhee.

In 1975, McPhee and Gribble co-founded McPhee Gribble, an Australian publishing house that was the first publisher of numerous well-known Australian authors, including Glen Tomasetti, Helen Garner, Tim Winton, Murray Bail, Kaz Cooke, Peter Cundall, Rod Jones, Jean McCaughey, Rodney Hall, Kathy Lette, Gabrielle Carey and Drusilla Modjeska. In 1989, McPhee Gribble was sold to Penguin Books.

In 1990, she partnered with Eric Beecher and together they launched Text Media Group; and attracted authors including Peter Singer, Tim Flannery, The Chaser team, Shane Maloney, Hazel Hawke, Robert Manne and Raimond Gaita. Text was sold to Fairfax Media in 2004.

In 2005, again with Beecher, she co-founded Private Media and acquired Crikey, and additional online news services.

Gribble was a Director of the Australian Broadcasting Corporation, including a term as deputy chair, a member of the Australia Council, a director of Lonely Planet, of the Melbourne Symphony Orchestra, the Melbourne Major Events Company, Austrade, Circus Oz, Care Australia, and a founding member of the Women's Electoral Lobby, as well as the Essendon Football Club's Women's Network.

Gribble died of pancreatic cancer in October 2011, aged 69.

== Honours and recognition ==
Gribble was appointed a Member of the Order of Australia in the 1993 Australia Day Honours. She was inducted onto the Victorian Honour Roll of Women in 2001.
