= Kerry-Anne Walsh =

Australian author, former journalist and political commentator

- Occupations: Journalist, author
- Years active: 1989-present
- Notable work: The Stalking of Julia Gillard

Kerry-Anne Walsh is an Australian author, former journalist and political commentator. She is also the author of the award-winning book, The Stalking of Julia Gillard. She also wrote another book, Hoodwinked: How Pauline Hanson Fooled a Nation.

== Background ==
For 25 years, Walsh was in the Canberra press gallery. She had senior posts in radio and TV as well as in print until she stepped away from being a full-time journalist. She still maintains her political commentary, appearing on radio with regular involvement with Radio New Zealand. On Television, she appears regularly on Sky News's Speer Program. In the late 1980s, Walsh was a producer for Kerry O'Brien's Face to Face program. In the early 1990s, she was a producer on ABC's Radio National. In 2003, she joined the Fairfax group where she wrote for Sydney's Sunday paper, The Sun-Herald as a federal political writer. She was also a writer for The Bulletin for six years.

== Career ==
In 2007, as a political correspondent, she wrote for The Sydney Morning Herald about the defeat of the Howard government and Kevin Rudd's victory.

In 2009, Walsh quit her position in the Canberra press gallery. She then chronicled the coverage by the media of the Gillard government and what she claimed was the undermining by people she referred to as Team Rudd.

In July 2013, her book The Stalking of Julia Gillard had been put out early by its publishers Allen & Unwin.

In November 2013, The Sydney Morning Herald reported that Rachel Griffiths was to play Julia Gillard in a television drama based on the book.

In March, 2014, she was nominated for an Indie Award in the non-fiction category for The Stalking of Julia Gillard. In May that year, she won the Australian Book Industry Award for her book.

In 2015, it was reported by The Australian Financial Review that the Gillard film was scheduled for production later that year. The proposal for the film was rejected by the Australian television networks.

In 2018, her book, Hoodwinked: How Pauline Hanson Fooled a Nation was released. It was a survey of the subject Hanson's career over 23 years, as an accidental local councilor to the surprise in 1996 of being a national political figure and the re-emergence in 2016.

On 17 April 2019, along with Van Badham, Gray Connolly, Adam Liaw, and Michael Roddan, she was one of the panel of The Drum which was hosted by Fran Kelly.

== Publications ==
List
Title	Release info	ISBN	Year	Notes
The Stalking of Julia Gillard	Allen & Unwin	ISBN 978-1-74237-922-7	2013	
Hoodwinked: How Pauline Hanson Fooled a Nation	Allen & Unwin	ISBN 978-1-76011228-8	2018	

== Articles (selective) ==
- ABC - Leave now and forever hold your peace
