= Salt Rain (novel) =

Book by Sarah Armstrong

- First edition
- Author: Sarah Armstrong
- Language: English
- Publisher: Allen & Unwin, Australia
- Publication date: 2004
- Publication place: Australia
- Media type: Print (Paperback)
- Pages: 218
- ISBN: 1741143691
- Followed by: His Other House

Salt Rain is a 2004 novel by Australian novelist Sarah Armstrong.

== Plot summary ==
After the disappearance of her mother Mae, fourteen-year-old Allie Curran goes to live with her aunt Julia in the small dairy farm where Mae grew up. Allie slowly comes to learn about her heritage, her family, and her mother's story. A reversal of the classic Australian theme of a child lost in the bush.

== Notes ==
- Dedication: For Joel

== Reviews ==
A reviewer for Publishers Weekly noted: "The novel's setting, a rainy farming valley in northern Australia, makes for effective atmosphere, but the backward-looking narrative moves slowly, mired in Allie's memories of Mae."

In Kirkus Reviews the writer agreed with that assessment: "Armstrong is talented, but her emotional delicacy is in danger of drowning in the portentous atmospherics."

== Awards and nominations ==
- 2005 shortlisted Miles Franklin Literary Award
- 2005 shortlisted Queensland Premier's Literary Awards — Best Fiction Book

== See also ==
- 2004 in Australian literature
