= Maggie Naouri =

Australian actress

- Occupation: Actor
- Years active: 2013–present

Maggie Naouri is an Australian actress, known for her roles as Rose Atkins in Wentworth and Anu Singh in Joe Cinque's Consolation (2016).

== Early life ==
Naouri is of Armenian and Jordanian ancestry. She was educated at Trinity Lutheran College on the Gold Coast in Queensland. In 2012, she graduated from the Victorian College of Arts with a Bachelor of Dramatic Arts.

== Career ==
Naouri's first television role was a journalist in the soap opera Neighbours in 2013. This led to her casting in the recurring role of nurse Rose Atkins in prison drama Wentworth. Director Sotiris Dounoukos cast Naouri as the lead in his 2016 film Joe Cinque's Consolation. Naouri found the casting process to be long, as her first audition was in 2013 and she learned she had the role in 2015. For her portrayal of Anu Singh, Naouri was nominated for the 2016 AACTA Award for Best Actress in a Leading Role.

== Filmography ==
=== TV ===
- Sisters (2017) TV series – Phoebe (1 episode)
- Sunshine (2017) TV mini series – Rima Saad (3 episodes)
- Glitch (2017) TV series – Alison (1 episode)
- Wentworth (2014–2015) TV series – Rose Atkins (19 episodes)
- Offspring (2014) TV series – Mary (1 episode)
- Neighbours (2013–2014) TV series – Ruby Knox

=== Film ===
- Joe Cinque's Consolation (2016) – Anu Singh
