= Hilary McPhee =

Australian writer and editor (1941–2026)

Hilary McPhee AO
- Born: Hilary Jane McPhee; 15 August 1941; Melbourne, Victoria, Australia
- Died: 1 October 2026 (aged 85)
- Education: University of Melbourne, Monash University
- Occupations: Writer; editor
- Known for: Co-founding publishing firm McPhee Gribble with Di Gribble

Hilary Jane McPhee AO (15 August 1941 – 1 October 2026) was an Australian writer, editor and publisher, who co-founded the publishing house McPhee Gribble with Di Gribble in 1975.

== Early life and career ==
McPhee was born in Melbourne, Victoria on 15 August 1941. She was a graduate of the University of Melbourne.

She was a founding director, with Di Gribble, of McPhee Gribble (1975–89), chair of the Australia Council for the Arts and of the Major Organisations Board (1994–97), and a founding director and sometime editor of online political newsletter New Matilda. She received an honorary doctorate from Monash University and was the inaugural Vice-Chancellor's Fellow at the University of Melbourne.

From 2006–10 she was living and working between the Middle East and Italy, writing a book about the region and articles about matching philanthropic initiatives to the needs of young people. Her marriage in 1986 to writer Don Watson ended in divorce in 2009.

Other People's Words, published in 2001, documents her publishing life. Her selection of Australian writing, Wordlines, was published in 2010. She annotated and edited film maker Tim Burstall's diaries from the early 1950s, published by MUP as Memoirs of a Young Bastard: the Diaries of Tim Burstall.

Other People's Houses, is a memoir, it was published by MUP in November 2019.

McPhee was inducted onto the Victorian Honour Roll of Women in 2001 and appointed an Officer of the Order of Australia for service to the arts in the 2001 Queen's Birthday Honours.

She served as a judge for major literary prizes including the Miles Franklin Award, Victorian Premier's Literary Awards and the Melbourne Prize.

In 2016, The Hilary McPhee Award for an essay published in Meanjin was established by the University of Melbourne, from a donation made by McPhee's brother Professor Peter McPhee.

== Personal life and death ==
McPhee married artist Peter Freeman in 1964 with whom she had a daughter, Sara Harriet Freeman, and a son, Rupert. In 1976 she married publisher John Michie, with whom she had a son, James.

McPhee died on 1 October 2026, at the age of 85.

== Bibliography ==
- Other People's Words (2001, Picador) ISBN 0330491555
- Wordlines: Contemporary Australian Writing editor, (2010, Five Mile Press) ISBN 9781742116587
- Other People's Houses (2019, MUP) ISBN 9780522875645
