= The Stalking of Julia Gillard =

- First edition
- Author: Kerry-Anne Walsh
- Publisher: Allen & Unwin
- Publication date: 2013
- Publication place: Australia
- Media type: Print
- ISBN: 978 1 74237 922 7
- Followed by: Hoodwinked: How Pauline Hanson Fooled a Nation

The Stalking of Julia Gillard is a book by former journalist and political commentator, Kerry-Anne Walsh, about Julia Gillard, the 2010–2013 Prime Minister of Australia, and the alleged attempts to oust her by "Team Rudd".

== Publication ==
In July 2013, the book was published ahead of schedule by Allen & Unwin because of Gillard's defeat in the leadership spill in June. The book alleges a campaign by the Rudd Team to oust Julia Gillard, and was highly praised in reviews.

In March 2014, the author was shortlisted for an Indie Award in the non-fiction category. In May that year, she won an Australian Book Industry Award in the non-fiction category.

== Film ==
In November 2013, The Sydney Morning Herald reported that Rachel Griffiths was to play Julia Gillard in a television drama based on the book. The film was to be produced by Richard Keddie who had made films about Australian political figures in the past. In 2015, it was reported by The Australian Financial Review that the Gillard film was scheduled for production later that year. The proposal for the film was rejected by the Australian television networks.
