= Helen Garner =

Australian author (born 1942)

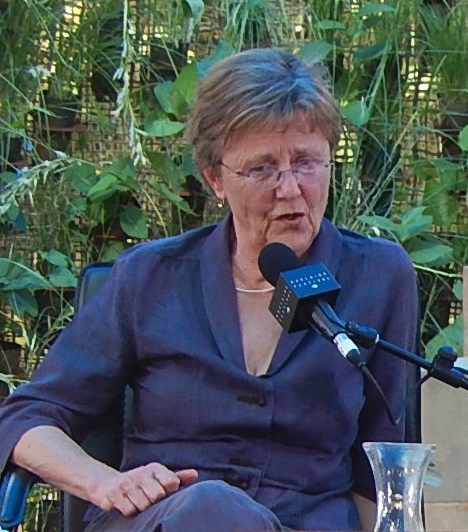
- Garner in 2015
- Born: Helen Ford; 7 November 1942 (age 84); Geelong, Victoria, Australia
- Education: University of Melbourne (BA)
- Occupations: Novelist, short-story writer, journalist
- Spouse(s): Bill Garner (1967–71); Jean-Jacques Portail (1980–85); Murray Bail (1992–2000)
- Children: Alice Garner
- Writing career
- Notable works: Monkey Grip (1977); The First Stone (1995); Joe Cinque's Consolation (2004); This House of Grief (2014)
- Notable awards: Walkley Award (1993); Victorian Honour Roll of Women (2001); Baillie Gifford Prize (2025); New South Wales Premier's Literary Awards; Victorian Premier's Literary Awards; Queensland Premier's Literary Awards

Helen Garner (née Ford; born 7 November 1942) is an Australian novelist, short-story writer, screenwriter and journalist. Garner's first novel, Monkey Grip, published in 1977, immediately established her as an original voice on the Australian literary scene—it is now widely considered a classic. She has a reputation for incorporating and adapting her personal experiences in her fiction, something that has brought her widespread attention, particularly with her novels Monkey Grip and The Spare Room (2008).

Throughout her career, Garner has written both fiction and non-fiction, and her works have covered a broad range of themes and subject matter. Some of her books have attracted controversy, such as her book The First Stone: Some Questions About Sex and Power (1995) about a sexual-harassment scandal in a university college. She has also written for film and theatre. Adaptations of two of her works have appeared as feature films: her debut novel, Monkey Grip, and her true-crime book Joe Cinque's Consolation (2004)—the former released in 1982 and the latter in 2016. This House of Grief (2014) is another true-crime book. She has consistently won awards for her work, including the Walkley Award for a 1993 Time magazine report. In 2025 she won the Baillie Gifford Prize for non-fiction, for How to End a Story: Collected Diaries.

== Early life and education ==
"[an] ordinary Australian home—not many books and not much talk"

— Garner describing her upbringing and childhood home in Geelong

Garner was born Helen Ford to Bruce and Gwen Ford (née Gadsden) in Geelong, Victoria, on 7 November 1942. She was the eldest of six children. Her sister Catherine Ford is also a writer of fiction. Garner described her upbringing as being in an "ordinary Australian home—not many books and not much talk".

Garner attended Manifold Heights State School, Ocean Grove State School and then The Hermitage in Geelong, where she was the head prefect and dux. She left Geelong after her high school graduation at the age of 18 to study at the University of Melbourne, residing at Janet Clarke Hall, and graduating with a Bachelor of Arts degree with majors in English and French. One of her teachers at the University of Melbourne was the poet Vincent Buckley.

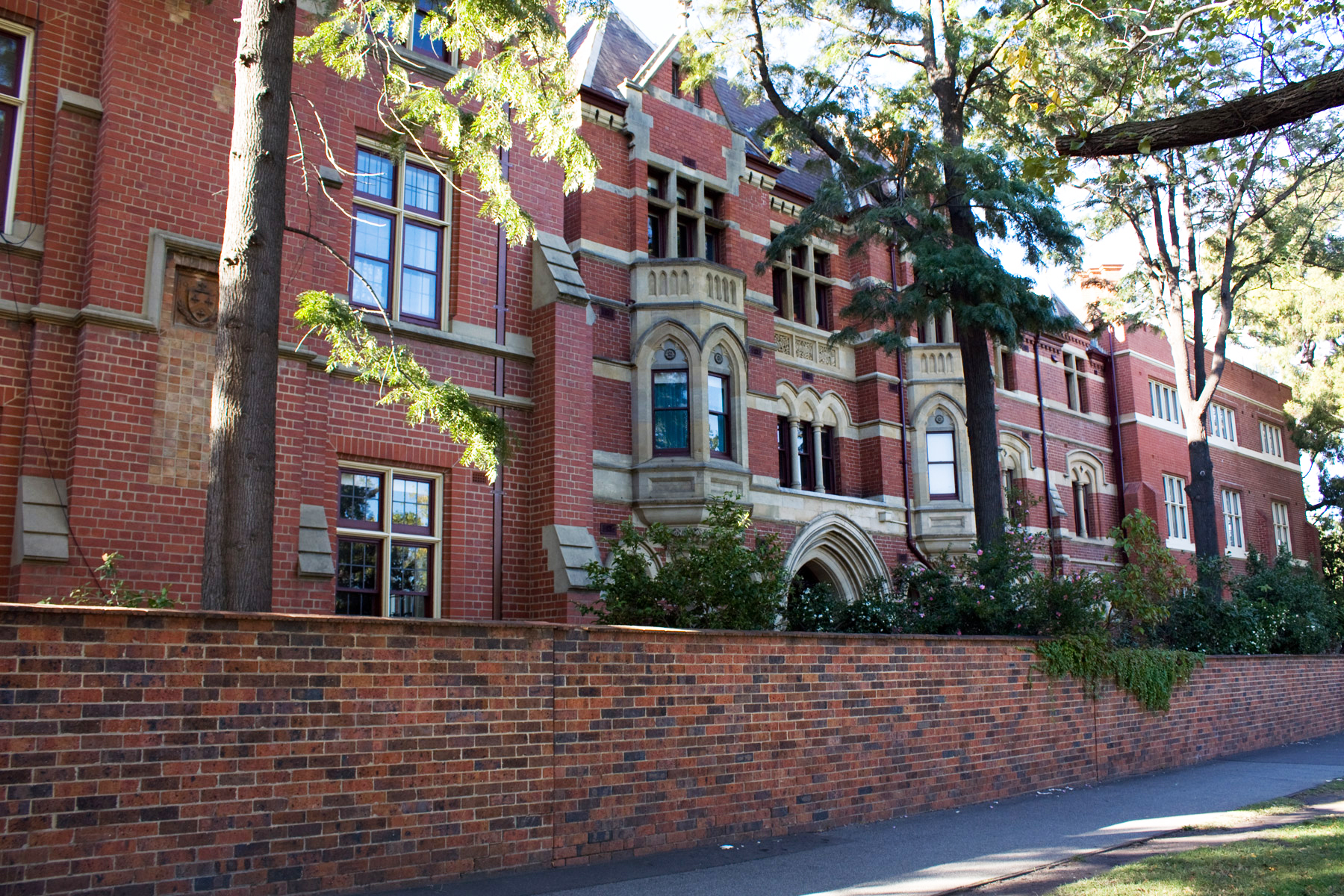
Janet Clarke Hall, where Garner resided in the 1960s as a student of the University of Melbourne

== Teaching ==
Between 1966 and 1972, Garner worked as a teacher at various Victorian high schools. In 1967, she also travelled overseas and met Bill Garner, whom she married in 1968 on their return to Australia, aged 25. Her only child, the actor, musician and writer Alice Garner, was born in 1969. Garner's first marriage ended in 1971.

In 1972, Garner was sacked by the Victorian Department of Education for "giving an unscheduled sex education lesson to her 13-year-old students at Fitzroy High School". She had written an essay about the lesson and published it under a pen name in The Digger, a countercultural Melbourne-based magazine. Garner wrote that she had intended to give a lesson on Ancient Greece, but the textbooks given to her students had been defaced with sexually explicit drawings. When her identity was revealed, she was called into the Victorian Department of Education and dismissed. The case was widely publicised in Melbourne, bringing Garner a degree of notoriety. Members of the Victorian Secondary Teachers Association went on strike in protest at the deputy director of Secondary Education's decision to fire Garner.

Aside from her writing for The Digger, she also wrote articles for the Melbourne feminist newspaper Vashti's Voice.

Garner appeared in the 1975 independent film Pure Shit, which focuses on four drug addicts searching for heroin in Melbourne.

== Writing career ==
=== Early career and fiction writing ===
Garner came to prominence at a time when Australian writers were relatively few in number, and Australian women writers were, by some, considered a novelty. Australian academic and writer, Kerryn Goldsworthy, writes that "From the beginning of her writing career Garner was regarded as, and frequently called, a stylist, a realist, and a feminist".

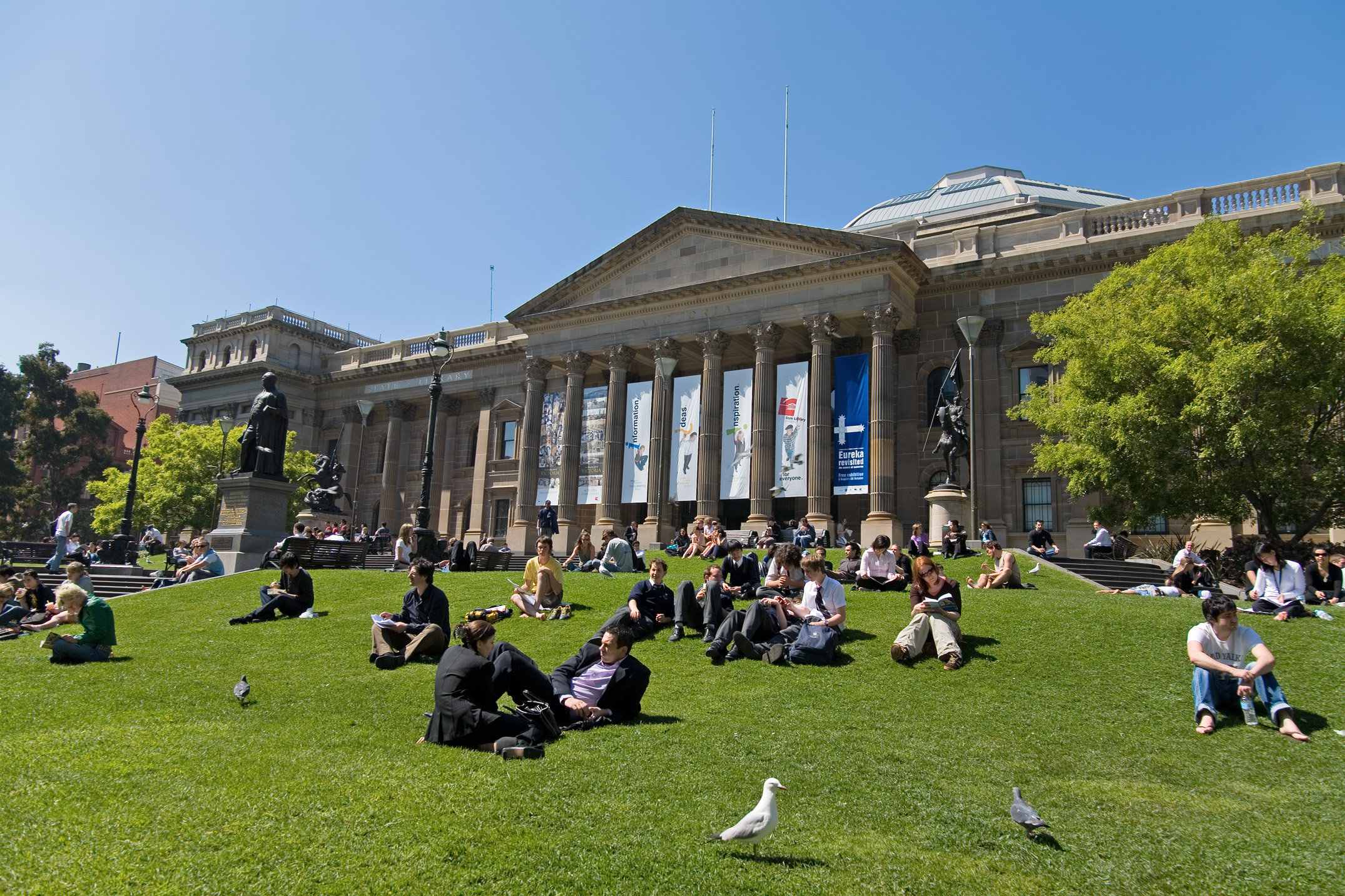
Garner wrote most of Monkey Grip at Melbourne's State Library of Victoria in the mid-1970s.

Her first novel, Monkey Grip (1977), relates the lives of a group of fledgeling artists, single parents, drug addicts and welfare recipients living in Melbourne share-houses. In particular focus is the increasingly co-dependent relationship between single mother Nora and Javo, a flaky junkie whom Nora is in love with, despite him repeatedly drifting in and out of her life. The novel, set in inner-city Melbourne suburbs Fitzroy and Carlton, was written in the domed reading room at the State Library of Victoria, after Garner's teaching dismissal. It is now widely considered a classic.

Years later she stated that she had adapted it directly from her personal diaries and based the relationship between Nora and Javo on a relationship she had with a man at the time. Other peripheral characters in the book were based on people in Garner's own social circle from Melbourne share-houses. Monkey Grip was very successful: it won the National Book Council Award in 1978 and was adapted into a film in 1982.

Goldsworthy suggests that the success of Monkey Grip may well have helped revive the careers of two older but largely ignored Australian women writers, Jessica Anderson and Thea Astley. Astley wrote of the novel that "I am filled with envy by someone like Helen Garner for instance. I re-read Monkey Grip a while ago and it's even better second time through". Critics have retrospectively applied the term grunge lit to describe Monkey Grip, citing its depiction of urban life and social realism as key aspects of later works in the subgenre.

In subsequent books, she has continued to adapt her personal experiences. Her later novels are The Children's Bach (1984) and Cosmo Cosmolino (1992). In 2008 she returned to fiction writing with the publication of The Spare Room, a fictional treatment of caring for a dying cancer patient, based on the illness and death of Garner's friend Jenya Osborne. She has also published several short-story collections: Honour & Other People's Children: Two Stories (1980), Postcards from Surfers (1985) and My Hard Heart: Selected Fictions (1998).

In 1986, Australian academic and critic Don Anderson wrote of The Children's Bach: "There are four perfect short novels in the English language. They are, in chronological order, Ford Madox Ford's The Good Soldier, Scott Fitzgerald's The Great Gatsby, Hemingway's The Sun Also Rises and Garner's The Children's Bach." The Australian composer Andrew Schultz wrote an opera of the same name, which premiered in 2008.

Garner said, in 1985, that writing novels was like "trying to make a patchwork quilt look seamless. A novel is made up of scraps of our own lives and bits of other people's, and things we think of in the middle of the night and whole notebooks full of randomly collected details". In an interview in 1999, she said that "My initial reason for writing is that I need to shape things so I can make them bearable or comprehensible to myself. It's my way of making sense of things that I've lived and seen other people live, things that I'm afraid of, or that I long for".

Not all critics have liked Garner's work. Goldsworthy writes, "It is certainly the case that Garner is someone whose work elicits strong feelings ... and people who dislike her work are profoundly irritated by those who think she is one of the best writers in the country". Novelist and reviewer Peter Corris wrote in his review of Monkey Grip that Garner "has published her private journal rather than written a novel", while Peter Pierce wrote in Meanjin of Honour & Other People's Children that Garner "talks dirty and passes it off as realism".

Goldsworthy suggests that these two statements imply that she is not really a writer. In contrast, critic Peter Craven argues that her novella The Children's Bach "should put paid to the myth of Helen Garner as a mere literalist or reporter", arguing, in fact, that it "is light-years away from any sprawling-tell-it-all naturalism, [that] it is concentrated realism of extraordinary formal polish and the amount of tonal variation which it gets from its seemingly simple plot is multifoliate to the point of being awesome".

=== Screen writing ===
She has written three screenplays: Monkey Grip (1982), written with and directed by Ken Cameron; Two Friends (1986), directed by Jane Campion for TV; and The Last Days of Chez Nous (1992), directed by Gillian Armstrong. The relationship between two characters in The Last Days of Chez Nous was loosely inspired by the extramarital affair Garner's second husband had with her sister.

Craven writes that "Two Friends is arguably the most accomplished piece of screenwriting the country has seen and it is characterised by a total lack of condescension towards the teenage girls at its centre".

=== Non-fiction writing ===
Garner is prepared to reveal intimate, rather shameful things. Things most of us wouldn't cough up with a gun to our head.

— Kate Legge, The Australian, 2008

Garner has written non-fiction from the beginning of her career as a writer. In 1972, she was fired from her teaching job after publishing in The Digger, a counter-culture magazine, an anonymous account of frank and extended discussions she had with her students about sexuality and sexual activities. She wrote for this magazine from 1972 to 1974. In 1993, she won a Walkley Award for her Time magazine account of a murder trial following the death of a toddler at the hands of his stepfather.

One of her most famous and controversial books is The First Stone: Some Questions About Sex and Power (1995), an account of a 1992 sexual harassment scandal at Ormond College. It was a best-seller in Australia but also attracted considerable criticism. Garner received hate mail from women in Australia who accused her of derailing the feminist debate, and closing ranks with the abuser. She has since commented: "Sometimes I would have these kind of panic attacks caused by the hostility that some people showed towards me. I guess I knew there was going to be trouble, but the vitriolic nature of it gave me a bit of a shock".

Garner's other non-fiction books include True Stories: Selected Non-Fiction (1996), The Feel of Steel (2001), Joe Cinque's Consolation (2004), This House of Grief – The Story of a Murder Trial (2014), Everywhere I Look (2016) and The Season (2024). She also contributed to La Mama, the Story of a Theatre (1988).

This House of Grief is about Robert Farquharson, a man who drove his children into a dam, killing them.

Joe Cinque's Consolation details a notorious murder case in Canberra involving a law student, Anu Singh, who drugged and murdered her boyfriend. It was adapted into a feature film in 2016. The film had premieres at both the Melbourne Film Festival and the Toronto International Film Festival, where it was generally well received, although detractors felt that the absence of Garner's voice from the story impacted the film—James Robert Douglas, writing for The Guardian, stated the film adaptation contained the "bones but not the wisdom of Garner's book".

Garner co-authored The Mushroom Tapes (2025) with Chloe Hooper and Sarah Krasnostein. The book is based on a series of conversations between Garner, Hooper and Krasnostei, about the case known as the "Mushroom murders", in which Erin Patterson murdered several people by serving them poisonous mushrooms for lunch.

=== Themes ===
"I understand Australia. I fit in here. My work has never, until recently, gone outside Australia. My publishers used to mind that a lot more than I did. I felt I was writing for people here. I never wanted to write about Australia as a spectacle for people elsewhere. I think a lot of writers here wrote about Australia as if it were a phenomenon. I never felt the urge or ability to do that."

— Helen Garner on grounding her work in Australia, 2017

Garner has covered a broad range of themes in her work, including feminism, love, loss, grief, ageing, illness, death, murder, betrayal, addiction and the duality of the human psyche, particularly in manifestations of "good" and "evil". Her earliest work, Monkey Grip, is well known for its untamed depiction of heroin addiction. Its central character, a single mother, falls in love with an addict in an inner-city bohemian Melbourne suburb, dotted with junkies and share houses, during the 1970s. Drug addiction was not a subject Garner revisited, aside from touching on recreational drug use among university students in Joe Cinque's Consolation. Monkey Grip established Garner's trademark theme of obsession, particularly in conjunction with love and sexuality—enmeshed with substance abuse mirroring the addiction of romantic love.

Some of her novels address "sexual desire and the family", exploring "the relationship between sexual behaviour and social organisation; the anarchic nature of desire and the orderly force of the institution of 'family'; the similarities and differences between collective households and nuclear families; the significance and the language of housework; [and] the idea of 'the house' as image, symbol, site and peace."

Garner has become known for her depiction of Australian life, both in the city and rural regions—she was born in Geelong and spent much of her life in Melbourne, approximately 75 kilometres (47 miles) from her hometown. Anne Myers, in an article written for The Sydney Morning Herald, recognised Garner's portrayals of the location of Melbourne as essential to Monkey Grip itself as any character: "Garner was writing Melbourne into the literary landscape and for the first time I saw my own world reflected back at me".

Joe Cinque's Consolation, This House of Grief and, to a lesser extent, The First Stone were commentaries on the justice system in Australia, how (and if) it adequately responds to crime, and the question of culpability.

Craven comments that Garner is "always an extremely accurate writer in terms of the emotional states she depicts". Many of her books touch upon the inexplicable, irrational, and dark side to human behaviour—as well as Garner's attempts to understand human behaviour and sociology, which often eludes the average Australian and wider society, as well as the Australian justice system. In The Fate of The First Stone, Garner writes that she believes most people would prefer to keep incomprehensible stories of extreme behaviour at "arm's length" because it is "more comfortable, easier".

Craven wrote that Garner is fearless in her honesty: "she shows us what she does not know or is too blind to see: she shows us the poverty of the self in the face of impercipience caused by sentiment or anger, prejudice, ignorance or dumb incapacity." He further commented on her ability to sometimes identify with the story's perceived villain, "[the] transgressor who at some level shares our own fingerprints".

Similarly, critics and journalists have highlighted Garner's portrayal of "ordinary people" caught up in extraordinary experiences, or the everyday person who, "under life's unbearable pressures", has "surrendered to their darker selves". James Wood, in a profile on Garner published in The New Yorker, stated that her work is absorbed in issues of gender and class, which he writes are "not categories so much as structures of feeling, variously argued over, enjoyed, endured, and escaped".

In her portrayal of Australian life, Garner has engaged with themes of masculinity and its associated social codes. These themes are central to her 2024 book The Season, which documents the experiences of teenage boys as they grow into adulthood through their involvement in Australian rules football.

== Personal life ==
After her marriage to Bill Garner ended, Garner married two more times: to Jean-Jacques Portail (1980–85) and Australian writer Murray Bail (born 1941), from whom she separated in the late 1990s.

In her work, she has been open about her struggle with depression and her two abortions.

She has one child, Alice Garner (b. 1969), from her marriage to Bill Garner. Alice Garner is also an author, as well as a musician, teacher and historian.

Garner is a supporter of the Western Bulldogs in the Australian Football League (AFL). She chronicles the fortunes of the club in her 2024 book The Season.

In 2003, a portrait of Garner, titled True Stories, painted by Jenny Sages, was a finalist in the Archibald Prize.

== Recognition ==
=== Personal achievement awards ===
- 2001 – Inducted into the Victorian Honour Roll of Women
- 2006 – Melbourne Prize for Literature
- 2019 – Australia Council Award for Lifetime Achievement in Literature
- 2020 – Australian Book Industry Awards' Lloyd O'Neil Award and Hall of Fame
- 2023 – Australian Society of Authors' ASA Medal

=== Book awards ===
- Monkey Grip
  - 1978 – National Book Council's Banjo Award (the first woman to win this award)
- The Children's Bach
  - 1986 – South Australian Premier's Awards
- Postcards from Surfers
  - 1986 – New South Wales Premier's Literary Awards, Christina Stead Prize for Fiction
- Two Friends
  - 1987 – New South Wales Premier's Literary Awards, Television Writing Award
  - 1987 – Best Screenplay in a Telefeature
- Cosmo Cosmolino
  - 1993 – Shortlisted for the Miles Franklin Award
- Did Daniel Have to Die?
  - 1993 – Walkley Award for Best Feature Writing, published in Time
- True Stories: Selected Non-fiction
  - 1997 – Nita Kibble Literary Award
- Joe Cinque's Consolation
  - 2004 – ABIA Book of the Year
  - 2005 – Ned Kelly Awards joint winner for Best True Crime
- The Spare Room
  - 2008 – Victorian Premier's Literary Awards, Vance Palmer Prize for Fiction
  - 2008 – Queensland Premier's Literary Awards Fiction Book Award
  - 2009 – Barbara Jefferis Award
- This House of Grief
  - 2015 – Ned Kelly Award – Best True Crime
  - 2015 – Longlisted for the Stella Prize
  - 2015 – Shortlisted for the ABIA General Non-Fiction Book of the Year
  - 2015 – Shortlisted for the New South Wales Premier's Literary Awards
  - 2016 – Windham–Campbell Literature Prize for non-fiction works
  - 2016 – Western Australian Premier's Book Awards – non-fiction
  - 2016 – Western Australian Premier's Book Awards – overall prize
- Everywhere I Look
  - 2017 – Shortlisted for The Indie Book Awards
- How to End a Story: Collected Diaries
  - 2025 – Winner, Baillie Gifford Prize
- The Season
  - 2025 – Shortlisted for the University of Queensland Nonfiction Book Award at the Queensland Literary Awards
- The Mushroom Tapes (2025; co-authored with Chloe Hooper and Sarah Krasnostein)
  - 2026 – Winner, ABIA General Nonfiction Book of the Year
  - 2026 – Shortlisted, Indie Book Awards Book of the Year – Non-Fiction

== Bibliography ==
=== Novels ===
- Monkey Grip (1977)
- Moving Out (1983), ISBN 0170062309
- The Children's Bach (1984)
- Cosmo Cosmolino (1992)
- The Spare Room (2008)

=== Short story collections ===
- Honour & Other People's Children: Two Stories (1980)
- Postcards from Surfers (1985)
- My Hard Heart: Selected Fiction (1998)
- Stories: The Collected Short Fiction (2017)

=== Screenplays ===
- Monkey Grip (1982, directed and co-written by Ken Cameron)
- Two Friends (1986, telemovie, directed by Jane Campion)
- The Last Days of Chez Nous (1992, directed by Gillian Armstrong)

=== Non-fiction ===
- La Mama: History of a Theatre (Liz Jones with Betty Burstall and Helen Garner, 1988), ISBN 014011548X
- The First Stone: Some Questions About Sex and Power (1995)
- True Stories: Selected Non-Fiction (1996)
- And the Winner Is–: Eighteen Winning Stories from Eltham's Alan Marshall Award, Australian Authors, Both Winners and Judges, Discuss Their Work in a Book about Writing (authors Helen Garner and Jon Weaving) (1997), ISBN 1876044152
- The Feel of Steel (2001)
- Joe Cinque's Consolation (2004)
- This House of Grief – The Story of a Murder Trial (2014)
- Regions of Thick-Ribbed Ice (2015), ISBN 9781863957663
- Everywhere I Look (2016)
- True Stories: The Collected Short Non-Fiction (2017), ISBN 9781925498875
- The Season (2024)
- The Mushroom Tapes (2025), with Chloe Hooper and Sarah Krasnostein

=== Autobiographies ===
- Yellow Notebook: Diaries Volume I 1978–1987 (2019), ISBN 9781922268143
- One Day I'll Remember This: Diaries 1987–1995 (2020), ISBN 9781922330277
- How To End A Story: Diaries 1995–1998 (2021), ISBN 9781922458179

=== Selected essays and reporting ===
- "Man with the Pearl-White Cord", December 2005 – January 2006, No. 8, The Monthly
- "Moving Experience", September 2005, No. 5, The Monthly
- "Punishing Lauren", June 2005, No. 2, The Monthly
- "A Date with Darcy". The Sydney Morning Herald. 18 January 2013.

=== Selected critical studies and reviews of Garner's work ===
- Parker, David (July–August 1996). "The range of goods we live by : some reflections on the Garner controversy". Quadrant. 40 (7–8 [328]): 33–38.
- Plunkett, Felicity (September 2014). "Our terrible projections : Helen Garner and the corridors of empathy". Australian Book Review. 364: 15–17. Review of This House of Grief.

In October 2023, John Powers, American public radio network NPR's pop culture critic, wrote: "This Australian writer might be the greatest novelist you've never heard of", noting in particular The Children's Bach, and This House of Grief.
