= Joe Cinque's Consolation =

Book by Helen Garner

Joe Cinque’s Consolation: A True Story of Death, Grief and the Law
- First edition cover
- Author: Helen Garner
- Language: English
- Genre: True crime
- Publisher: Picador
- Publication date: 2004
- Publication place: Australia
- Pages: 336
- ISBN: 978-0-330-36497-3

Joe Cinque's Consolation: A True Story of Death, Grief and the Law is a non-fiction book written by Australian author Helen Garner, and published in 2004.

It is an account of Garner's presence at the separate trials of Anu Singh and her friend Madhavi Rao, who were accused of murdering Singh's boyfriend Joe Cinque and Garner's attempts to understand the events that led to his death, as well as the legal and personal responses to the crime. The book was adapted into a 2016 film of the same name.

Joe Cinque's Consolation explores themes of grief and loss, culpability and criminal responsibility, duty of care, punishment and retribution, personality psychology (particularly narcissistic personality disorder and dependent personality disorder), social class in Australia, drug use, and other social problems. A national bestseller, the book has sold 100,000 copies.

== Joe Cinque's death ==
Anu Singh, a law student at Canberra's Australian National University, killed her boyfriend Joe Cinque on 26 October 1997 with a lethal dose of heroin, after she had laced his coffee with Rohypnol. A number of her friends and acquaintances had been informed of her intent to kill him and some were present at parties she held in which he was drugged; none of these friends alerted authorities or police. She was subsequently found guilty of his manslaughter. The most involved of the friends, Madhavi Rao, was acquitted of all charges. Rao moved abroad and adopted a new identity after the conclusion of the trials, while Singh was released from prison in 2001.

== Summary ==
Joe Cinque's Consolation begins with Garner being informed of Singh's second 1999 trial and its circumstances, when it was already in progress. She becomes interested and travels from her Sydney residence to attend the hearings in Canberra. She relates her impressions of the trial, including her negative reactions to Singh and her mystification at Rao's and others' lack of shock at and complicity in Singh's plans, which she determines to be a state of apathy and abandonment of compassion. As the trial progresses she becomes acquainted with Cinque's mother Maria and feels that the court system is not distributing sufficient justice to the victim or his family.

After the trial Garner interviews Singh's family and attempts to interview Singh and Rao, but both refuse or are uncontactable. Because of Singh's refusal to be interviewed or contacted, Garner bases most of her information about the woman from erstwhile friends, anecdotal evidence and court transcripts. Singh is portrayed as socially gifted and ambitious, but highly narcissistic, with significant self-esteem issues. Additionally, Garner notes the accused kept diaries about her interactions with men as a teen in which she treated them as disposable commodities, wore high heels to high school, and according to anecdotal evidence from her former best friend, treated Cinque with an element of derision–sometimes mocking him and making jibes about what she thought was a lack of intellect and sophistication to her friends. Some of Singh's former friends thought her to be shallow, self-obsessed and desperate for male approval.

As the book progresses, Garner becomes interested in victim's rights, interviews the presiding judge and repeatedly visits and becomes a friend of Cinque's family, and eventually concludes that the purpose of the book is to be consolation for Joe Cinque, as the trial proceedings could not be.

=== Themes ===
Garner uses the case to explore far-reaching themes of human behaviour, culpability and responsibility, duty of care, victims' rights and crime/punishment. She also touches on issues that range from the nature of human memory, including how it is not explicitly clear or cohesive, nor is it linear, and thus under cross-examination in a courtroom, any kind of lapse in memory, or contradiction of a preceding statement, may portray a person as a liar or an unworthy witness.

Class and cultural clashes are drawn between the working class Italian-Australian family of the Cinques, compared to the "professional class" Indian-Australian family of the Singhs. This comparison starkly juxtaposes the blue-collar or working class Cinques (although Joe Cinque had a degree in engineering), from a working-class Newcastle suburb with the middle class status of the Singhs, who lived in comfortable inner-west Sydney.

Furthermore, the use of psychiatry in law, is alluded to various times. Garner questions whether a "psychological sophistication" that has developed in light of modern behavioural science overrides the fact that some actions are plainly wrong and should be punishable, regardless of the pathology of the person who commits them. She poses this question in reference to Anu Singh. Singh's defence team used her "abnormality of mind" (a diagnosis of borderline personality disorder and psychotic depression was referenced in the court proceedings) as an explanation for her killing Cinque, akin to the insanity defense.

Finally, Garner laments on the perfunctory decision that the Crown psychiatrist would not be given direct access to Singh, and her diagnosis would be made instead on the basis of transcripts and interviews with mental health professionals in the past – Garner admits this "floored" her. Additionally, one reviewer writing for the Australian Book Review opined that it was Maria Cinque who called out the "flaky moral relativism" of the ANU students who were indifferent to Singh's plans, as well as the Canberra courts, the defence lawyers and the judge who handled the case. The complicity of the students, and whether or not they played a role in Cinque's death by not alerting authorities, was also a topic debated extensively throughout the text.

== Critical response ==
Joe Cinque's murder wasn't a series of facts that I could be professional about, that I could seize and manipulate with my mind. I was helpless in the face of it. It billowed like a dark curtain on every breeze that blew. It seeped into everything I did. It was a stricken land to which my imagination had been exiled. I couldn't find a place to get back across the border. The only way was to write about it. But I was paralysed.

— Helen Garner's journal, on the process of producing a book about Cinque's murder

Joe Cinque's Consolation was reviewed in a number of major newspapers and magazines. It was praised for Garner's writing and its positioning as Joe Cinque's story. Criticisms of the book centred on it failing to tell the story it set out to tell, particularly its inability to explain Singh or her actions and her failure to engage with the purpose of the adversarial justice system. Some saw this as a deliberate attempt by Garner – to honour Cinque, whose family had been not been given a voice or adequate justice by the court. In his review for the Australian Book Review, Peter Rose remarked that "books such as Joe Cinque’s Consolation often dignify the parents' agony and indignation. In Maria Cinque we have one of the great stalwarts in this literature of loss. She is always there in court – listening, occasionally hissing and weeping, raging when she must. 'They were keeping vigil,’ Garner says, marvelling at the Cinques' stamina. Which is what Garner becomes conscious of doing." He further commented on the book being Garner's conscious testament to the injustice dealt to Joe Cinque and his family: "For what are these books but tributes to the dead, swipes at our forgetfulness, minor consolations for the living: the parents and siblings and friends who feel devastated and betrayed? One thinks of all the unattested lives, the little murders".

Elisabeth Hanscombe, writing for Academia, wrote that Garner's writing, and her depiction of Anu Singh, addressed the notion that for a layperson it "may perhaps be difficult to understand that someone can be extremely intelligent, can function well academically, be beautiful and at the same time be seriously disturbed".

One reviewer compared it with The First Stone (1995), noting that it was less about the underlying debates and more about the story. Another, Maryanne Dever (writing for the Australian Women's Book Review) criticised similarities in the themes of both books, particularly Garner's perceived hostility to the women subjects and their physical appearance.

The cover of the re-printed edition from 2006 contains a blurb extracted from a review in The Bulletin, which reads: "A book which functions at one level as a psychological mystery, but at deeper levels is an exploration of the adequacy of the law to dispense justice, and the responsibility that human beings have to each other...It is told with compassion, a singular kind of honesty, and unadorned intelligence".

== Media response ==
Both Singh herself and Cinque's parents gave interviews shortly after the book's release. Singh recounted her own memories of the killing and her feelings about it after her release and expressed regret at not agreeing to an interview by Garner. She told interviewers that she wished to redress some of the book's imbalance towards her.

Maria Cinque said that she would never forgive Singh for killing her son and did not believe her defence against the murder charge. Garner also stated that she still did not understand or empathise with Singh, although some aspects of her behaviour resonated.

== Awards and nominations ==
- Winner (tie), 2005 Ned Kelly Awards (The Crime Writers Association of Australia), Best True Crime
- Finalist and highly commended, 2005 Walkley Awards, Non-fiction book
- Shortlisted, 2005 NSW Premier's Literary Awards, Douglas Stewart Prize for non-fiction
- Shortlisted, 2005 Victorian Premier's Literary Award, The Nettie Palmer Prize for Non-fiction
- Shortlisted, 2006 Adelaide Festival Awards for Literature, non-fiction

== Film adaptations ==
Twelve years after publication, the book was adapted into a 2016 film by writer/director Sotiris Dounoukos and Matt Rubinstein, and produced by Matt Reeder of Night Kitchen Productions. Principal photography ran for seven weeks in Canberra during April to June 2015. There was a principal cast of around 40 main and supporting characters, plus around 300 extras.
