= Everywhere I Look (book) =

Collected short works by Helen Garner

- First edition
- Author: Helen Garner
- Publisher: Text Publishing
- Publication date: 2016
- ISBN: 978-1-925355-36-9

Everywhere I Look is a 2016 collection of short works by Australian writer Helen Garner. It is published by Text Publishing. In review in The Irish Times, Irish novelist Evelyn Conlon wrote that "it thematic selection from 15 years of work, the pieces ranging from review length to essays to snapshots from Garner's diaries."
