= Peter Craven (literary critic) =

Australian literary critic

- Education: University of Melbourne
- Occupation: Writer
- Relatives: Greg Craven (brother)
- Writing career
- Genres: Literary criticism, cultural studies

Peter Craven (born 1949 or 1950) is an Australian literary critic and cultural studies writer.

== Life and career ==
While enrolled for a Master of Arts at the University of Melbourne, Craven met Michael Heyward with whom he founded Scripsi, a literary magazine which was published from 1981 to 1994. Craven has written for The Age, The Australian and the Australian Literary Review. His work has also appeared in Oxford Guide to Contemporary Writing, the Times Literary Supplement and London Review of Books.

Craven has been described as both a "literary hack" and "one of the most prolific, erudite and opinionated voices in Australian literary circles". In 2004 he was awarded the Pascall Prize for Australian Critic of the Year.

The legal academic Greg Craven is his younger brother.

== Bibliography ==
=== Essays, reporting and other contributions ===
- Craven, Peter (March 2003). "Introduction". Quarterly Essay. 9: iii–vii.
- — (August 2005). "Enthralled by shadows". Griffith Review. 5.
- — (January–February 2018). "Makers of poetry and masters of prose : tradition and innovation in translating the Iliad". Quadrant. 62 (1–2 [543]): 94–101.
