= McPhee Gribble =

Former Australian publishing house

- Status: Defunct
- Founded: 1975
- Successor: Penguin
- Country of origin: Australia
- Headquarters location: Carlton, Victoria
- Key people: Founders - Di Gribble, Hilary McPhee

McPhee Gribble was an Australian independent publishing firm, based in Carlton, Victoria. It became an imprint of the Penguin Group.

== History ==
Founded by Di Gribble and Hilary McPhee in 1975 McPhee Gribble was the initial publisher of works by significant Australian writers including Tim Winton, Dorothy Hewett, Helen Garner, Rod Jones, Brian Matthews, Murray Bail, Kaz Cooke, Martin Flanagan, John Misto, and Jennifer Dobbs. It entered into a "co-publishing" agreement with Penguin Group in 1983.

In 1989, it was sold to and became an imprint of Penguin.
