= The First Stone =

Book by Helen Garner

The First Stone: Some questions about sex and power
- First edition
- Author: Helen Garner
- Cover artist: Maikka Trupp/Mary Callahan
- Language: English
- Publisher: Picador Australia
- Publication date: 1 April 1995
- Publication place: Australia
- Pages: 222
- ISBN: 978-0-330-35583-4

The First Stone: Some questions about sex and power is a controversial non-fiction book by Helen Garner about a 1992 sexual harassment scandal at Ormond College, one of the residential colleges of the University of Melbourne, which the author had attended in the 1960s. It was first published in Australia in 1995 and later published in the United States in 1997.

The book revolves around Garner's attempts to interview the two young women at the centre of a sexual assault scandal but who declined to meet her. This sets off a narrative exploring the politics, sexual and otherwise, of the college as well as Garner's personal feelings about the original events and the people she meets in the course of her research. Aside from the events and the harassment itself, Garner explores themes of sexism, masculinity, feminism, gender wars, fraternalism in colleges, "Old Boys" and the establishment, and power balances in both educational settings and personal relationships.

A national bestseller, the book was condemned by some Australian feminists for a variety of reasons. The journalist Virginia Trioli published Generation F: Sex, Power & the Young Feminist in 1996 and a collection of essays critical of The First Stone was published under the title bodyjamming (1997) by Jenna Mead, an Ormond College councillor who acted as an emissary for the two women complainants. Garner gave her first detailed response to the critics in a speech at The Sydney Institute entitled "The fate of The First Stone" (1995). Despite its controversy, it was critically acclaimed, has been discussed widely academically and sold over 100,000 copies.

== Background ==
Ormond College, a residential campus of the University of Melbourne, was embroiled in controversy in 1992 after an incident of sexual harassment was disclosed to the press. It involved two students and an Ormond Master. Their names were protected in the book under pseudonyms–Olivia Mayer and Kirsten Campbell (Elizabeth Rosen and Nicole Stewart in The First Stone). Mayer and Campbell accused the college's master, Alan Gregory, (Colin Shepard in the book), of indecently groping them at an end of year party that followed a valedictory dinner. Shortly after the party, which was held in October 1991, Mayer and Campbell took their allegations to the police and the allegations progressed to the Melbourne Magistrates' Court. Gregory was found guilty at the Magistrate's Court, which was later overturned on appeal at the Victorian County Court. Gregory subsequently resigned from his position as Ormond Master in 1993.

=== Garner's involvement ===
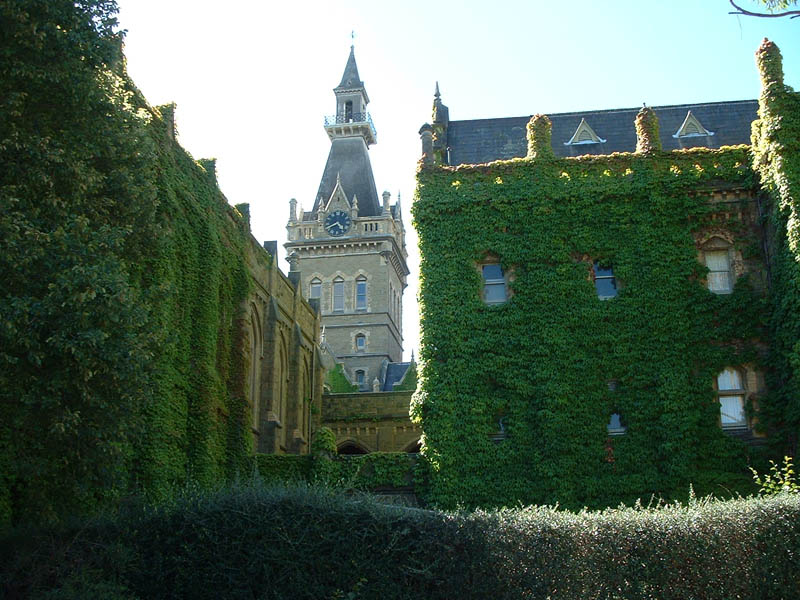
The ivy-covered exterior of Ormond College.

Garner had been a student at the University of Melbourne in the 1960s, was familiar with its environment and had read about the case in the Melbourne newspaper The Age. Immediately struck by what Garner perceived to be a "punitive" and "priggish" response to the incident by the complainants, and her own ties to feminism, she called her female friends to discuss their angles. Garner's friends' agreement with her own positioning–that by seeking punitive punishment and enforcement of the law to what she saw as a "hapless social blunder"–ignited the desire to delve deeper into the case and publish a book as a response to the incident. The trajectory of the book shows the development of Garner's stance: she initially, as the book begins, had intentions to interview the two women to gain more "complex sense" of the allegations, as well as to understand why the girls went to the police. Their initial reluctance to talk to Garner, which eventually turns into flat-out refusal after a sympathetic letter to The Master written by Garner is circulated throughout the university and in Melbourne publications, drives her stance to be less objective and cements her views of the women as the book progresses.

By the book's conclusion, Garner had tried a number of times to contact the women, their legal representatives and intermediaries, and friends to no avail. She interviewed Alan Gregory, the accused, in his office. Later she visits the family home to speak to Gregory's wife, who discussed the damage the accusations had done to their family. Garner accessed transcripts, media publications, and had ties to women who knew the complainants, as well as employing her own experiences as "evidence" (a device that was of particular scrutiny from the books critics). She concludes the book by highlighting the difference between real sexual violence and assault towards women, compared to what she perceived as a mostly trivial, boorish incident at Ormond. Furthermore, she discusses feminism in general, the power balances between the accused and the women, who she refers to as "powerful anima figures", but speculated that they were also unaware, or unwilling, to exert their power to the Master on the night of the event, in favour of seeking a more law-based approach later on.

== Release ==
The First Stone was first published in Australia on 1 April 1995 by Picador, followed by the United States on 14 August 1997 by Bloomsbury Publishing.

A 25th anniversary edition with a foreword by Leigh Sales was released in Australia by Picador on 28 January 2020. It also contains an afterword by Bernadette Brennan, as well as a reprint of David Leser's original 1995 Good Weekend interview with Garner, and her own 1995 address "The Fate of The First Stone".

=== Reception and controversy ===
There were some people who never got over that, but that doesn't worry me anymore, because I have had letters from people who've said, I was a student when your book came out, and I put shit on you, and I refused to read the book because I knew what it was supposed to say, and now I've been out in the world, and I'm really sorry.

— Helen Garner, in response to people's changing opinions (2017)

The First Stone was controversial for a number of reasons. As the students involved refused to be interviewed by Helen Garner, the point of view of the accused master of the college was instead used in isolation and the narrator was therefore criticised as being biased towards his point of view. Elements of the story became fictionalised–for example, the tutor who advised the students was split into nine separate characters giving the appearance of a "feminist conspiracy" at work. She also failed to mention that Gregory is alleged to have assaulted 5 women, three of whom dropped their complaints. Additionally, the book was also criticised for its view that feminism had become weakened and claim that the appropriate response to being groped was "a slap in the face" rather than a police complaint.

Writing for The New Yorker, writer Janet Malcolm gave a mixed review of The First Stone. She called the book's narrative "remarkable", but also "vertiginously turbulent", and went onto criticise the approach Garner took towards the young women. In her review, Malcolm references a quote from the book, in which Garner fantasises about a "less destructive response" to the incident in which she confronts the Master, and tells him "this time I'm prepared to let it pass". Malcolm wrote that "this is not good enough. This is closing ranks with the abuser. Sexual harassment isn't sexual abuse–exactly. It lies on the border between a crime and a mistake. [But] it is a minor offence with major associations".

In The New York Times, Tamar Lewin wrote: "The feminist debate over the politics of victimization has raged in this country [the US] for years; Ms. Garner's book brings Australian feminists squarely into the fray", though she lamented on Garner's personal investigation adding very little to the facts of the incident.

James Wood, also writing for The New Yorker, wrote in a 2016 article that The First Stone "still seems a brilliantly prescient book – in its complexity, in the tense torque of its self-argument, and in its very vulnerability and stunned intolerance".

== See also ==
- Sexual harassment in education
