= Text Publishing =

Australian publisher

- Founded: 1994
- Founder: Diana Gribble and Eric Beecher
- Country of origin: Australia
- Headquarters location: Melbourne
- Distribution: Penguin Random House (Australia); Consortium Book Sales & Distribution (North America); Turnaround Publisher Services (Europe, Middle East)
- Key people: Michael Heyward, Penny Heuston
- Publication types: Books, journals
- Official website: www.textpublishing.com.au

Text Publishing is an Australian publisher of fiction and non-fiction, based in Melbourne, Victoria.

== Company background ==
Text Media was founded in Melbourne in 1990 by Diana Gribble and Eric Beecher, along with designer Chong Weng Ho and others, with a small book publishing division known as Text Publishing. Michael Heyward joined in 1992, and the small publishing house became independent in 1994.

When Text Media was taken over by Fairfax Media in 2004, Michael Heyward and his wife Penny Hueston entered into a joint venture with Scottish publisher Canongate.

Maureen and Tony Wheeler, founders of Lonely Planet, bought Canongate's share in Text in 2011, making it a wholly Australian-owned company.

In 2012, Text launched a series of Australian classics, republishing out-of-print works.

In January 2025, Text announced that it had been acquired by Penguin Random House.

== People ==
As of August 2022, Heyward was the publisher.

== Awards ==
=== Text awards ===
The Text Prize for Young Adult and Children’s Writing was inaugurated in 2008 and is awarded annually. As of 2021 it was valued at AU$10,000. In January 2025, Text announced that it had discontinued this award.

In 2021 Text announced the Steph Bowe Mentorship for Young Writers. It is open to writers under 25 years of age and provides 20 hours of manuscript development assistance and writers' centre membership to the winner.

=== Awards won by Text ===
Text has won the ABIA Small Publisher of the Year award three times, and in both 2018 and 2019 was awarded the Leading Edge Books Small Publisher of the Year award.

== Significant publications ==
Notable publications by Text include:

- Eucalyptus by Murray Bail
- Dancing with Strangers by Inga Clendinnen
- The Weather Makers by Tim Flannery
- Stasiland by Anna Funder
- The Secret River by Kate Grenville
- The Henson Case by David Marr (2008)
- The Rosie Project by Graeme Simsion (2013)
- Truth by Peter Temple

Winners of the Miles Franklin Award published by Text include:

- Bodies of Light by Jennifer Down
- The Labyrinth by Amanda Lohrey
- Truth by Peter Temple
