= Drift Street =

Novel by Claire Mendes

Drift Street is a fiction book by Australian author Claire Mendes. Karen Brooks says that along with Edward Berridge's The Lives of the Saints and Andrew McGahan's Praise, Drift Street is a grunge lit book which "...explor[es] the psychosocial and psychosexual limitations of young sub/urban characters in relation to the imaginary and socially constructed boundaries defining...self and other" and "opening up" new "limnal [boundary] spaces" where the concept of an abject human body can be explored. Brooks states that Berridge's short stories provide "...a variety of violent, disaffected and often abject young people", characters who "...blur and often overturn" the boundaries between suburban and urban space.

== Analysis ==
The characters in Drift Street are described as being unhealthy, unclean, overweight, tattooed, having greasy hair, and living in deteriorating dwellings "that resemble the bodies who inhabit them". The Drift Street characters are "vile and abusive" people who prey on "unattractive victims". The Washbourne family in this novel has an abusive, alcoholic father, two adult sons who are mostly unemployed and one of whom is in a Neo-Nazi gang and "pollutes his body" with drugs, and there is an incestuous relationship between the father and the daughter.

Karen Brooks states that Drift Street, Edward Berridge's The Lives of the Saints, and Andrew McGahan's Praise "...explor[e] the psychosocial and psychosexual limitations of young sub/urban characters in relation to the imaginary and socially constructed boundaries defining...self and other" and "opening up" new "limnal [boundary] spaces" where the concept of an abject human body can be explored. Brooks states that Berridge's short stories provide "...a variety of violent, disaffected and often abject young people", characters who "...blur and often overturn" the boundaries between suburban and urban space. Brooks states that the marginalized characters in The Lives of the Saints, Drift Street and Praise) are able to stay in "shit creek" (an undesirable setting or situation) and "diver[t]... flows" of these "creeks", thus claiming their rough settings' "limnality" (being in a border situation or transitional setting) and their own "abjection" (having "abject bodies" with health problems, disease, etc.) as "sites of symbolic empowerment and agency".
