= Grunge lit =

Australian literary genre

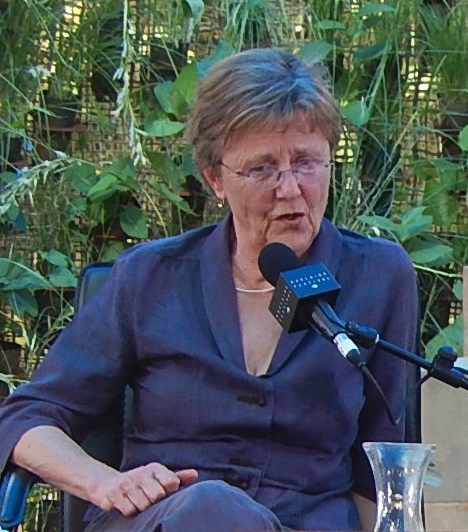
Australian writer Helen Garner is considered a grunge lit author.

Grunge lit (an abbreviation for "grunge literature") is an Australian literary genre usually applied to fictional or semi-autobiographical writing concerned with dissatisfied and disenfranchised young people living in suburban or inner-city surroundings, or in "in-between" spaces that fall into neither category (e.g., living in a mobile home or sleeping on a beach). It was typically written by "new, young authors" who examined "gritty, dirty, real existences", of lower-income young people, whose egocentric or narcissistic lives revolve around a nihilistic or "slacker" pursuit of casual sex, recreational drug use and alcohol, which are used to escape boredom. The marginalized characters are able to stay in these "in-between" settings and deal with their "abject bodies" (health problems, disease, etc.). Grunge lit has been described as both a sub-set of dirty realism and an offshoot of Generation X literature. The term "grunge" is a reference to the US rock music genre of grunge.

The genre was coined in 1995 following the success of Andrew McGahan's first novel Praise, which was released in 1991 and became popular with sub-30-year-old readers, a previously under-investigated demographic. Other authors considered to be "grunge lit" include Linda Jaivin, Fiona Kelly McGregor and Justine Ettler. Since its invention, the term "grunge lit" has been retrospectively applied to novels written as early as 1977, namely Helen Garner's Monkey Grip. Grunge lit is often raw, explicit, and vulgar, even to the point of Ettler's The River Ophelia (1995) being labeled pornographic.

The term "grunge lit" and its use to categorise and market this diverse group of writers and authorial styles has been the subject of debate and criticism. Linda Jaivin who disagreed with putting all of these authors in one category, Christos Tsiolkas called the term a "media creation", and Murray Waldren denied grunge lit even was a new genre; he said the works actually are a type of the pre-existing dirty realism genre.

== Themes and style ==
Above all, these stories are about the disintegration of love. The male characters in these novels are individualistic and detached from everything: people (references to friends or family are rare), their environment and the self. This separation breeds a disquiet which they try to assuage with violent erotic behaviour.

— Jean-François Vernay, A Brief Take on the Australian Novel (2016)

Most grunge lit is published as short stories and novels; however, there are some anthologies and collections. The majority of grunge lit works place their subjects within an urban or suburban environment where they explore the relationship between the body and the soul and between the self and the "other". The novels typically depict an "inner cit[y]" "...world of disintegrating futures where the only relief from...boredom was through a nihilistic pursuit of sex, violence, drugs and alcohol". Often the central characters are disfranchised, lacking drive and determination beyond the desire to satisfy their basic needs.

The young people in the works are typically dissatisfied, alienated, bitter and cynical. Some characters in grunge lit face existential ennui and boredom. According to Ian Syson, the "depressed and frightened young Australian men" who populate grunge novels express "their alienation through excessive alcohol consumption, acts of brutality, sexual conquests and active contempt for authority"".

An Australian 2009 PhD dissertation stated that in "Grunge fiction..., the fluids, organs and desires of its sexualised bodies are... promiscuously scattered" and the "...waste-full materiality of the body becomes the medium through which new forms of identity and politics are presented." The River Ophelia is about a young female university student who faces domestic violence, self-abuse and is set in bars and nightclubs, amidst drug use, addiction and a mood of obsessive, self-destructive love:

The thing is … the thing about all this pain we go through, all this love that just hurts all the time, the thing about all this pain is that it’s really exquisite. It’s exquisite pain. That’s what makes us keep going back for more. (The River Ophelia, p. 134)

=== Character types and settings ===
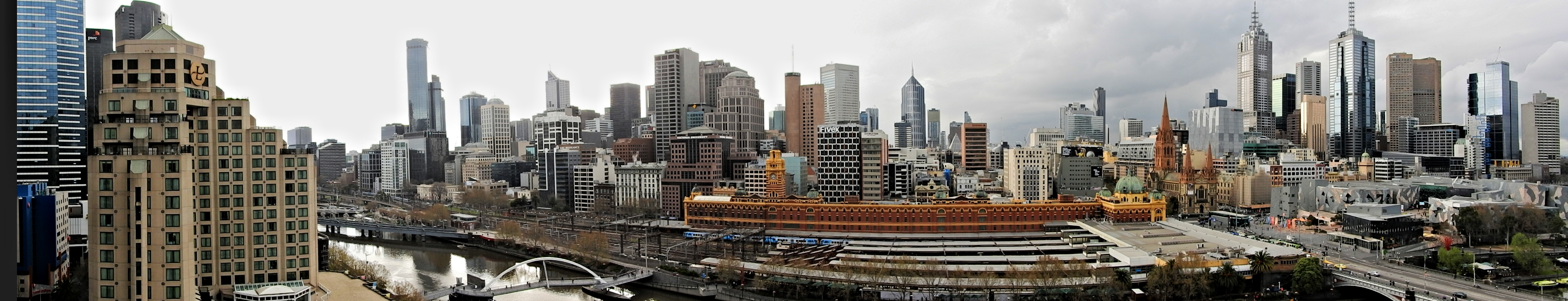
Grunge lit is almost exclusively set in the inner-city, with some or most of its action taking place in city centres. One of the earliest examples of the genre, Monkey Grip (1977), was set in Melbourne. The novel relates the lives of people involved in open relationships, and the jealousy and turmoil this free-for-all lifestyle creates.

The characters in grunge lit are those on the social and cultural margins. Samantha Dagg's 2017 thesis identifies the grunge lit character archetype of the "disrupted individual", and its "gendered archetypes, the ‘transient female’ and ‘static male’." In Richard King's Kindling Does for Firewood, a chronicle of slackers in Melbourne, the male character, Peter, lives in a share house with unemployed roommates who only consume beer and drugs.

The suburbs are depicted as the "feminine", "lesser" and "domestic" counterpart to the more "masculine" and "phallic" city, with the latter being a zone of domination and power. Drift Street is almost exclusively set in suburban environments. Monkey Grip is set in an inner-city environment of shared housing. Some grunge lit stories depict characters who live in temporary dwellings, that are neither suburban or urban, or which are between two zones, such as on a beach, tent, caravan (motor home) or garage.

The characters in Claire Mendes' book Drift Street are described as being unhealthy, unclean, overweight, tattooed, having greasy hair, and living in deteriorating dwellings "that resemble the bodies who inhabit them". The Drift Street characters are "vile and abusive" people who prey on "unattractive victims". The Washbourne family in this novel has an abusive, alcoholic father, two adult sons who are mostly unemployed and one of whom is in a Neo-Nazi gang and "pollutes his body" with drugs, and there is an incestuous relationship between the father and the daughter.

The character Gordon in Praise is described as having long unwashed hair, an unshaven face, and pale, flabby skin, and he lives in a large, "old, dilapidated house" where all the renters share one bathroom. Gordon is also not the "normative" Australian male, as he "lacks strength", has low libido, and boasts of an affair with a man. The 14 and 15-year-old brothers in The Lives of the Saints have long hair, a mix of DIY and professional tattoos, and pierced ears and they live in a messy apartment that smells of alcohol, cigarette smoke and fried food.

Helen Garner's characters in her 1977 novel Monkey Grip are an inner-city male heroin addict drifting in and out of a destructive, obsessive relationship with a single mother, amidst a circle of artists and actors and people living on social assistance in shared housing. Grunge lit also focuses on characters with "abject" bodies that is, bodies that are deteriorating and characters facing health problems. For example, the male and female lead characters in Praise, Gordon Buchanan and Cynthia Lamonde, both have diseased bodies, with Cynthia facing skin that breaks out in rashes.

Justine Ettler, a Sydney-based writer, gained notoriety for her 1995 novel The River Ophelia. Although a setting is never explicitly mentioned in the novel, many critics and commentators have identified it to be Sydney. One writer proposed that Ettler chose to leave the city nameless to give it a universal big-city feel: "Australia’s national borders – figural and physical - are blurred to varying extents, and in quite different ways. In The River Ophelia, for example, there are frequent references to French authors, theories and artifacts. The novel is set in inner-city Sydney, but Ettler does not mention the name ‘Sydney’, suggesting she could in fact be describing any city in Australia or (more generally) the West."

Sydney has prominence among the counter-culture, and grunge lit movement, as Australia's birth-place of the "Push movement", which has been documented by many writers, namely Germaine Greer and Meaghan Morris. The Push movement, which flourished in inner-Sydney between the 1940s and 1970s, is described as being "a movement comprised of assorted men and women who congregated in inner-city Sydney". These men and women had "a liking for the bohemian life" and "opposed the church, the State, wowsers and censorship".

John Birmingham's He Died with a Felafel in His Hand (1994) is about a large number of roommates living in 13 shared houses in Brisbane and other cities. The title refers to a deceased heroin addict found in one such house. In the stories, the housemates include a med student, PhD student, a wargames enthusiast, a goth, an artist, a Rastafarian, a nurse, a taxi driver, two drug addicts and a British backpacker, some of whom have nicknames. In some flats, the roommates are constantly changing, with some only staying a few days or weeks. Not all the flatmates live inside in regular bedrooms; one lives in the garage of a house and another sleeps in a tent.

Karen Brooks stated that Clare Mendes' Drift Street, Edward Berridge's The Lives of the Saints, and Andrew McGahan's Praise "...explor[e] the psychosocial and psychosexual limitations of young sub/urban characters in relation to the imaginary and socially constructed boundaries defining...self and other" and "opening up" new "liminal [boundary] spaces" where the concept of an abject human body can be explored. Brooks states that Berridge's short stories provide "...a variety of violent, disaffected and often abject young people", characters who "...blur and often overturn" the boundaries between suburban and urban space. Brooks states that the marginalized characters in The Lives of the Saints, Drift Street and Praise are able to stay in "shit creek" (an undesirable setting or situation) and "diver[t]... flows" of these "creeks", thus claiming their rough settings' "liminality" (being in a border situation or transitional setting) and their own "abjection" (having "abject bodies" with health problems, disease, etc.) as "sites of symbolic empowerment and agency".

Brooks states that the story "Caravan Park" in Berridge's short story collection is an example of a story with a "liminal" setting, as it is set in a mobile home park; since mobile homes can be relocated, she states that setting a story in a mobile home "...has the potential to disrupt a range of geo-physical and psycho-social boundaries". Brooks states that in Berridge's story "Bored Teenagers", the adolescents using a community drop-in centre decide to destroy its equipment and defile the space by urinating in it, thus "altering the dynamics of the place and the way" their bodies are perceived, with their destructive activities being deemed by Brooks to indicate the community centre's "loss of authority" over the teens.

=== Marketing ===
Grunge lit books were marketed on their cover blurbs as "uncompromising narratives" that gave readers access to the "raw nerves of youth" in an "unflinchingly real", disturbing, and compelling manner. The authors use a confessional, diaristic style of narration and autobiographical elements to achieve an intimacy with the reader. These books were marketed in a way which emphasized the celebrity status of the young Gen X authors. Grunge lit was marketed as authentic and bluntly-written texts about young people's experiences which are raw, vulgar, and explicit.

== Authors ==
Australian authors recognised as having written grunge lit include Andrew McGahan whose novel Praise won the Australian/Vogel Literary Award in 1991, Helen Garner whose novel Monkey Grip won the National Book Council Award in 1978 and Edward Berridge who wrote The Lives of the Saints. Other grunge lit writers include: Christos Tsiolkas (Loaded), Linda Jaivin (Eat Me), Clare Mendes (Drift Street), Neil Boyack (co-author, with Simon Colvey, of Black), Fiona Kelly McGregor (Suck My Toes), Ben Winch (Liadhed), Justine Ettler (The River Ophelia), Leonie Stephens (Big Man's Barbie and Nature Strip), Eric Dando (Snailhy), Richard King (Kindling Does for Firewood), John Birmingham (He Died with a Felafel in his Hand), Barbara Wel (The Life-Styles of Previous Tenants). and Coral Hull.

== Link between literature and musical genre ==
Stuart Glover states that the term "grunge lit" takes the term "grunge" "...from the music industry" genre of grunge "...in the late 80s and early 90s—the Seattle bands". Some grunge writers are also musicians. In 2004, Ben Winch released a concept album and he plays improvisational rock and does intentionally lo-fi recordings.

== Critical analysis ==
In 1995, when the first books were identified as "grunge lit", the new term was deemed "problematic" and soon after the moniker was coined, it was "hotly contested" and it led to antithetical views. The majority of grunge lit books received little critical attention. Linda Jaivin condemned critics who categorized all these authors' vastly different works as "grunge lit", an approach she called an "excuse for a wank". The authors McGahan, McGregor and Tsiolkas criticized the "homogenizing effect" of conflating such a different group of writers. Tsiolkas called the "grunge lit" label a "media creation". University of New South Wales writing and literature professor Paul Dawson states that the rise of university creative writing programs was a factor which drove the development of grunge lit, as these programs encourage students to write, promote their students' works, and encourage the young authors to write in a diary-like style.

Grunge lit has been assessed as a type of protest by these young writers, a revolt against the dominant and conservative establishment baby boomer writers who had achieved success in Australia. One of the subjects that led to disagreement was whereas "grunge lit" texts were marketed as "outsider art", non-mainstream works that challenged the status quo, these books were promoted, marketed and sold by mainstream publishing houses. Some critics viewed grunge lit as a form of "social commentary". Sharyn Pearce states that McGahan's 1988 and Kill the Old pose questions about whiteness and masculinity in Australia, as well as exploring political and cultural critiques of Australian Bicentennial celebrations such as Expo '88.

Much of the response from critics was negative. One literary critic referred to the "'God-awful' prose of 'those appalling "grunge" novels' as 'surely fiction's last gasp before it disappears altogether to be replaced by the home shopping channel'." Critics have also called the writing in grunge novels "facile" or "bland", with one critic calling the texts more like "a school composition than a serious literary work". Some critics stated that grunge lit was the product of Generation X young authors raised in front of TV screens and cinema, which resulted in a form of literature that does not resemble the academic and mainstream Australian literature written by baby boomers that preceded it, and in texts which shock the reader, but without "moving" them emotionally.

In After the Celebration: Australian Fiction 1989–2007, Ken Gelder and Paul Salzman state that grunge lit writers focus on "grunge bases: drugs, vomit, shit, rough sex, a youth culture that embraces a certain chic poverty, and a barely suppressed misogyny." Ettler's The River Ophelia was considered pornographic by some reviewers, although defenders called it feminist erotica. Gelder and Salzman call grunge lit a "fashionable" genre and state that its goal was to "...épater le bourgeois" (French for "shock the bourgeoisie") with the "bourgeoisie represented by the middlebrow women's fiction", which the authors call "chick lit".

Murray Waldren "...denied grunge [lit] was a new genre"; he preferred to categorize these "...new publications [of the 1990s] within a wider tradition of 'dirty realism'". Dirty realism is a term coined by Bill Buford of Granta magazine to define a North American literary movement. Writers in this sub-category of realism are said to depict the seamier or more mundane aspects of ordinary life in spare, unadorned language. The term formed the title of the summer 1983 edition of Granta. Sometimes considered a variety of literary minimalism, dirty realism is characterized by an economy with words and a focus on surface description.

Writers working within the genre tend to avoid adverbs, extended metaphor and internal monologue, instead allowing objects and context to dictate meaning. Characters are shown in ordinary, unremarkable occupations, and often a lack of resources and money that creates an internal desperation. Ian Syson states that "grunge" "...goes by other names at different times and places in history", including naturalism, social realism, kitchen sink drama and the angry young men writers and playwrights in Britain, American realist writers like Henry Miller and Raymond Carver; and neo-realism authors.

== Post-grunge-lit ==
Michael Robert Christie's 2009 PhD dissertation, "Unbecoming-of-Age: Australian Grunge Fiction, the Bildungsroman and the Long Labor Decade" states that there is a genre called "post Grunge [lit]" which follows the grunge lit period. Christie names three examples of Australian "post-grunge lit": Elliot Perlman's Three Dollars, Andrew McCann's Subtopia and Anthony Macris' Capital. Kalinda Ashton (born 1978) has been called a post-grunge writer. Ashton, who was influenced by Christos Tsiolkas' controversial style, is the author of the novel The Danger Game. Samantha Dagg's 2017 MPhil thesis states that Luke Carman is a post-grunge writer.

== See also ==
- Australian literature
- Grunge
- Post-grunge
- Heroin chic
- List of Australian novelists
- Brat Pack
