= Southerly (journal) =

Australian literary magazine

Southerly is an Australian literary magazine, established in 1939. It is published in hardcopy and online once a year, and hosts fiction, creative non-fiction, and poetry by established and new authors as well as reviews and critical essays. The Long Paddock is an online supplement, carrying additional material.

== History ==
Southerly began in 1939 as a four-page bulletin of the Sydney branch of the London-based English Association, an organisation dedicated to preserving the purity of the English language. R. G. Howarth, lecturer in English at the University of Sydney, was the founding editor and continued as editor until he left Sydney in 1955. He published European and Australian literature together and wished to encourage 'cultural good relations between the mother and daughter countries'. The focus was on literature itself; the magazine was apolitical and non-ideological.

Kenneth Slessor was editor from 1956 to 1961, and added the subtitle a review of Australian literature. During his term as editor, the academic discussion of local literature continued to develop as a focus. G.A. Wilkes was editor from 1962 to 1986, and Elizabeth Webby from 1987. It was edited by David Brooks (then of the University of Sydney) and Elizabeth McMahon (of UNSW, Sydney) in 2019. It is now edited by Roanna Gonsalves of UNSW, Sydney. After a hiatus at the end of Professor Elizabeth McMahon's tenure as editor from 2023-2025, the journal was taken up by Roanna Gonsalves. The first issue under Gonsalves's stewardship was Southerly 80.1, 'First, The Future', which was co-edited by K.A Ren Wyld. In 2026, Southerly launched several new ventures, in addition to the publication of its annual issue: Barribugu, a publication and mentoring pathway for emerging writers in Australian schools; the annual Southerly Poetry Prize; the Grace-Southerly Emerging Writers Fellowships; and the quarterly Southerly Essay.

== Description ==
The title refers to a front of cold air coming from the south, bringing a quick cooling, and tempestuous conditions, after the heat of the day, referred to in Sydney as "southerly busters".

A connection to the University of Sydney has been maintained over the years. The magazine has previously been assisted by the Australia Council, the Australian Government's arts advisory and support organisation, the New South Wales Ministry for the Arts, and the School of English, Art, History, Film and Media, University of Sydney.

== Staff ==
As of October 2026 the editorial staff are:

- Editor — Roanna Gonsalves
- Poetry editor — Paul Dawson
- Fiction editor — Luke Johnson and Debra Adelaide
- Creative nonfiction editor — Melody Ellis
- Reviews editor — Craig Billingham
- Blogs editor and administrative assistant — Axel-Nathaniel Rose
- Barribugu editor — Michael Moller
