= The Lives of the Saints (Berridge short story collection) =

Collected stories by Edward Berridge

First edition

The Lives of the Saints is a collection of short stories by Australian writer Edward Berridge published by University of Queensland Press (UQP) in 1995. Karen Brooks calls the book an example of grunge lit, an Australian literary genre from the 1990s.

== Karen Brooks' analysis ==
In a 1998 article in the Australian Literary Studies journal, Karen Brooks called Berridge a grunge lit author and stated that along with Clare Mendes' Drift Street and Andrew McGahan's Praise, Berridge's book of stories "...explore[s] the psychosocial and psychosexual limitations of young sub/urban characters in relation to the imaginary and socially constructed boundaries defining...self and other" and "opening up" new "liminal [boundary] spaces" where the concept of an abject human body can be explored. Brooks states that Berridge's short stories provide "...a variety of violent, disaffected and often abject young people", characters who "...blur and often overturn" the boundaries between suburban and urban space.

Brooks states that the story "Caravan Park" in Berridge's short story collection is an example of a story with a "liminal" setting, as it is set in a mobile home park; since mobile homes can be relocated, she states that setting a story in a mobile home "...has the potential to disrupt a range of geo-physical and psycho-social boundaries". Brooks states that in Berridge's story "Bored Teenagers", the adolescents using a community drop-in centre decide to destroy its equipment and defile the space by urinating in it, thus "altering the dynamics of the place and the way" their bodies are perceived, with their destructive activities being deemed by Brooks to indicate the community centre's "loss of authority" over the teens. Brooks states that the marginalized characters in Berridge's short stories (and in Drift Street and Praise) are able to stay in "shit creek" (an undesirable setting or situation) and "diver[t]... flows" of these "creeks", thus claiming their rough settings' "liminality" (being in a border situation or transitional setting) and their own "abjection" (having "abject bodies" with health problems, disease, etc.) as "sites of symbolic empowerment and agency".

== Andrew McCann's analysis ==
Professor and fiction author Andrew McCann compared The Lives of the Saints to Christos Tsiolkas' Loaded, stating that in Berridge's book, there is "...none of [Loaded's] structural economy of the anti-epiphany to impose formal unity."
