= Abjection =

State of being cast off

In critical theory, abjection is the state of being cast off and separated from norms and rules, especially on the scale of society and morality. The term has been explored in post-structuralism as that which inherently disturbs conventional identity and cultural concepts. Julia Kristeva explored an influential and formative overview of the concept in her 1980 work Powers of Horror: An Essay on Abjection, where she describes subjective horror (abjection) as the feeling when an individual experiences or is confronted by the sheer experience of what Kristeva calls one's typically repressed "corporeal reality", or an intrusion of the Real in the Symbolic Order.

Kristeva's concept of abjection is used most commonly to analyze popular cultural narratives of horror, and discriminatory behavior manifesting in misogyny, homophobia and genocide. The concept of abjection builds on the traditional psychoanalytic theories of Sigmund Freud and Jacques Lacan, whose studies often narrowed in on the experience of the disintegration of personal distinctions, through neurosis in Freud and psychosis in Lacan.

== In literary critical theory ==
Drawing on the French tradition of interest in the monstrous (e.g., novelist Louis-Ferdinand Céline), and of the subject as grounded in "filth" (e.g., psychoanalyst Jacques Lacan), Julia Kristeva developed the idea of the abject as that which is rejected by or disturbs social reason – the communal consensus that underpins a social order. The "abject" exists accordingly somewhere between the concept of an object and the concept of the subject, representing taboo elements of the self barely separated off in a liminal space. Kristeva claims that within the boundaries of what one defines as subject – a part of oneself – and object – something that exists independently of oneself – there reside pieces that were once categorized as a part of oneself or one's identity that has since been rejected – the abject.

However, Kristeva created a distinction in the true meaning of abjection: "It is thus not the lack of cleanliness or health that causes abjection but what disturbs identity, system, and order. What does not respect borders, positions, rules. The in-between, the ambiguous, the composite." Since the abject is situated outside the symbolic order, being forced to face it is an inherently traumatic experience, as with the repulsion presented by confrontation with filth, waste, or a corpse – an object which is violently cast out of the cultural world, having once been a subject. Thus the sense of the abject complements the existence of the superego – the representative of culture, of the symbolic order: in Kristeva's aphorism, "To each ego its object, to each superego its abject."

From Kristeva's psychoanalytic perspective, abjection is done to the part of ourselves that we exclude: the mother. We must abject the maternal, the object which has created us, in order to construct an identity. Abjection occurs on the micro level of the speaking being, through their subjective dynamics, as well as on the macro level of society, through "language as a common and universal law". We use rituals, specifically those of defilement, to attempt to maintain clear boundaries between nature and society, the semiotic and the symbolic, paradoxically both excluding and renewing contact with the abject in the ritual act.

The concept of abjection is often coupled (and sometimes confused) with the idea of the uncanny, the concept of something being "un-home-like", or foreign, yet familiar. The abject can be uncanny in the sense that we can recognize aspects in it, despite its being "foreign": a corpse, having fallen out of the symbolic order, creates abjection through its uncanniness – creates a cognitive dissonance.

=== Cases ===
- Abjection is a major theme of the 1949 work The Thief's Journal (Journal du Voleur) by French author Jean Genet, a fictionalised account of his wanderings through Europe in the 1930s, wherein he claims as a criminal outcast to actively seek abjections as an existentialist form of "sainthood"
- The film Alien (1979) has been analysed as an example of how in horror and science fiction monstrous representations of the female resonate with the abject archaic figure of the mother. Bodily dismemberment, forcible impregnation, and the chameleon nature of the alien itself may all be seen as explorations of phantasies of the primal scene, and of the encounter with the boundaryless nature of the original abject mother.
- The 1990s-era Australian literary genre grunge lit often focuses on young adult characters with "abject" bodies that are deteriorating and characters facing health problems. For example, the male and female lead characters in Andrew McGahan's book Praise, Gordon Buchanan and Cynthia Lamonde, both have diseased bodies, with Cynthia facing skin that breaks out in rashes. Karen Brooks states that Clare Mendes' Drift Street, Edward Berridge's The Lives of the Saints, and Praise "...explor[e] the psychosocial and psychosexual limitations of young sub/urban characters in relation to the imaginary and socially constructed boundaries defining...self and other" and "opening up" new "limnal [boundary] spaces" where the concept of an abject human body can be explored. Brooks states that the marginalized characters (in The Lives of the Saints, Drift Street and Praise) are able to stay in "shit creek" (an undesirable setting or situation) and "diver[t]... flows" of these "creeks", thus claiming their rough settings' "limnality" (being in a border situation or transitional setting) and their own "abjection" (having "abject bodies" with health problems, disease, etc.) as "sites of symbolic empowerment and agency".

== In social critical theory ==
"Abjection" is often used to describe the state of often-marginalized groups, such as women, unwed mothers, people of minority religious faiths, sex workers, convicts, and poor and disabled people. From a deconstruction of sexual discourses and gender history Ian McCormick has outlined the recurring links between pleasurable transgressive desire, deviant categories of behaviour and responses to body fluids in 18th and 19th-century discussions of prostitution, sodomy, and masturbation (self-pollution, impurity, uncleanness). The term space of abjection is also used, referring to a space that abjected things or beings inhabit.

=== In organizational studies ===
Organizational theory literature on abjection has attempted to illuminate various ways in which institutions come to silence, exclude or disavow feelings, practices, groups or discourses within the workplace. Studies have examined and demonstrated the manner in which people adopt roles, identities and discourses to avoid the consequences of social and organizational abjection. In such studies the focus is often placed upon a group of people within an organization or institution that fall outside of the norm, thus becoming what Kristeva terms "the one by whom the abject exists," or "the deject" people. Institutions and organizations typically rely on rituals and other structural practices to protect symbolic elements from the semiotic, both in a grander organizational focus that emphasizes the role of policy-making, and in a smaller interpersonal level that emphasizes social rejection. Both the organizational and interpersonal levels produce a series of exclusionary practices that create a "zone of inhabitability" for staff perceived to be in opposition to the organizational norms.

One such method is that of "collective instruction," which refers to a strategy often used to defer, render abject and hide the inconvenient "dark side" of the organization, keeping it away from view through corporate forces. This is the process by which an acceptable, unified meaning is created – for example, a corporation's or organization's mission statement. Through the controlled release of information and belief or reactionary statements, people are gradually exposed to a firm's persuasive interpretation of an event or circumstance, that could have been considered abject. This spun meaning developed by the firm becomes shared throughout a community. That event or circumstance comes to be interpreted and viewed in a singular way by many people, creating a unified, accepted meaning. The purpose such strategies serve is to identify and attempt to control the abject, as the abject ideas become ejected from each individual memory.

Organizations such as hospitals must negotiate the divide between the symbolic and the semiotic in a unique manner. Nurses, for example, are confronted with the abject in a more concrete, physical fashion due to their proximity to the ill, wounded and dying. They are faced with the reality of death and suffering in a way not typically experienced by hospital administrators and leaders. Nurses must learn to separate themselves and their emotional states from the circumstances of death, dying and suffering they are surrounded by. Very strict rituals and power structures are used in hospitals, which suggests that the dynamics of abjection have a role to play in understanding not only how anxiety becomes the work of the health team and the organization, but also how it is enacted at the level of hospital policy.

=== In sociological studies ===
The abject is a concept that is often used to describe bodies and things that one finds repulsive or disgusting, and in order to preserve one's identity they are cast out. Imogen Tyler sought to make the concept more social in order to analyze abjection as a social and lived process and to consider both those who abject and those who find themselves abjected, between representation of the powerful and the resistance of the oppressed. Tyler conducted an examination into the way that contemporary Britain had labelled particular groups of people – mostly minority groups – as revolting figures, and how those individuals revolt against their abject identity, also known as marginalization, stigmatizing and/or social exclusion.

Exploration has also been done into the way people look at others whose bodies may look different from the norm due to illness, injury or birth defect. Researchers such as Frances emphasize the importance of the interpersonal consequences that result from this looking. A person with a disability, by being similar to abled people and also different, is the person by whom the abject exists. People who view this individual react to that abjection by either attempting to ignore and reject it, or by attempting to engage and immerse themselves in it. In this particular instance, Frances claims, the former manifests through the refusal to make eye contact or acknowledge the presence of the personal with a disability, while the latter manifests through intrusive staring. The interpersonal consequences that result from this are either that the person with a disability is denied and treated as an 'other' – an object that can be ignored – or that the individual is clearly identified and defined as a deject.

== In psychotherapy ==
By bringing focus onto concepts such as abjection, psychotherapists may allow for the exploration of links between lived experience and cultural formations in the development of particular psychopathologies. Bruan Seu demonstrated the critical importance of bringing together Foucauldian ideas of self-surveillance and positioning in discourse with a psychodynamic theorization in order to grasp the full significance of psychological impactors, such as shame.

Concerning psychopathologies such as body dysmorphic disorder (BDD), the role of the other – actual, imagined or fantasized – is central, and ambivalence about the body, inflated by shame, is the key to this dynamic. Parker noted that individuals suffering from BDD are sensitive to the power, pleasure and pain of being looked at, as their objective sense of self dominates any subjective sense. The role of the other has become increasingly significant to developmental theories in contemporary psychoanalysis, and is very evident in body image as it is formed through identification, projection and introjection. Those individuals with BDD consider a part of their body unattractive or unwanted, and this belief is exacerbated by shame and the impression that others notice and negatively perceive the supposed physical flaw, which creates a cycle. Over time, the person with BDD begins to view that part of their body as being separate from themselves, a rogue body part – it has been abjected.

There are also those who experience social anxiety, who experience the subjectification of being abject in a similar yet different way to those with BDD. Abject, here, refers to marginally objectionable material that does not quite belong in the greater society as a whole – whether this not-belonging is real or imagined is irrelevant, only that it is perceived. For those with social anxiety, it is their entire social self which is perceived to be the deject, straying away from normal social rituals and capabilities.

Studying abjection has proven to be suggestive and helpful for considering the dynamics of self and body hatred. This carries interesting implications for studying such disorders as separation anxiety, biologically centered phobias, and post traumatic stress disorder.

== In art ==
The roots of abject art go back a long way. The Tate defines abject art as that which "explore themes that transgress and threaten our sense of cleanliness and propriety, particularly referencing the body and bodily functions." Painters expressed a fascination for blood long before the Renaissance but it was not until the Dada movement that the fascination with transgression and taboo made it possible for abject art, as a movement, to exist. It was influenced by Antonin Artaud's Theatre of Cruelty. The Whitney Museum in New York City identified abject art in 1993.

It was preceded by the films and performances of the Viennese actionists, in particular, Hermann Nitsch, whose interest in Schwitter's idea of a gesamtkunstwerk (total artwork) led to his setting up the radical theatre group, known as the Orgien-Mysterien-Theater. The group used animal carcasses and bloodshed in a ritualistic way. Nitsch served time in jail for blasphemy before being invited to New York in 1968 by Jonas Mekas. Nitsch organised a series of performances which influenced the radical New York art scene. Other members of the Viennese Actionists, Gunter Brus, who began as a painter, and Otto Muehl collaborated on performances. The performances of Gunter Brus involved publicly urinating, defecating and cutting himself with a razor blade. Rudolf Schwarzkogler is known for his photos dealing with the abject. In the late 1960s, performance art become popular in New York, including by Carolee Schneemann. Mary Kelly, Genesis P. Orridge and GG Allin did this type of art.

In the 1980s and 1990s, fascination with the Powers of Horror, the title of a book by Julia Kristeva, led to a second wave of radical performance artists working with bodily fluids including Ron Athey, Franko B, Lennie Lee and Kira O' Reilly. Kristeva herself associated aesthetic experience of the abject, such as art and literature, with poetic catharsis – an impure process that allows the artist or author to protect themselves from the abject only by immersing themselves within it.

In the late 1990s, the abject became a theme of radical Chinese performance artists Zhu Yu and Yang Zhichao. The abject also began to influence mainstream artists including Louise Bourgeois, Helen Chadwick, Gilbert and George, Robert Gober, Kiki Smith and Jake and Dinos Chapman who were all included in the 1993 Whitney show. Other artists working with abjection include New York photographers, Joel Peter Witkin, whose book Love and Redemption and Andres Serrano whose piece entitled Piss Christ caused a scandal in 1989.

== See also ==
- Abhuman
- Alterity
- Antihumanism
- Georges Bataille
- Limit-experience
- Queer theory
- Transitional object
