= Paul Dawson =

Paul Dawson may refer to:

- Paul Dawson (American football) (born 1993), linebacker for the Cincinnati Bengals
- Paul Dawson (actor), American actor, DJ and writer
- Paul Dawson (lacrosse) (born 1985), Canadian lacrosse player
- Paul Dawson (politician) (born 1944), New Brunswick MLA
- Paul Dawson (professor) (born 1972), poet and professor from Australia
- Paul Dawson (rugby league) (born 1948), Australian rugby league footballer
- Paul Dawson, American music producer and songwriter known professionally as Hollywood Hot Sauce
