= Luke Carman =

Australian fiction writer and academic

Luke Carman is an Australian fiction writer and academic. He is known for his collection of semi-autobiographical stories, which is entitled An Elegant Young Man. The stories are set in Liverpool, Australia, a suburb outside Sydney. He has been called a post-grunge lit writer, a reference to an Australian literary genre from the 2000s which emerged following the 1990s grunge lit genre.

== Career ==
=== An Elegant Young Man ===
His first book, An Elegant Young Man, won the NSW Premier's Literary Award for New Writing. An Elegant Young Man is a collection of short stories that are linked together, and which are semi-autobiographical. The stories have a protagonist whose name is also Luke and who lives in the author's hometown. Carman stated that he used Liverpool, Australia, as a setting because Australia's "western suburbs have been largely absent from the face of Australian fiction", with an effort to show the "...ugliness of working class suburbia and the pain of being an outsider" with "...authenticity, warts and all."

In one of the stories, a teen who "...dreams of fame fade[s] into an adulthood of blue collar work"; the narrator/author is described as a "...passive force, constantly in the midst of the action but solely as an observer who cannot save anybody", as if in "paralysis", until characters' lives are "quietly lost to monotony." In another story, a female character who faces an abusive relationship becomes addicted to drugs. Carman used a "writers’ network" to hold discussions about draft versions of the book and perform the drafts, which helped him to develop his writing

=== Other activities and awards ===
He is a casual academic at Western Sydney University's Writing And Society Research Centre. In 2014, the Sydney Morning Herald named him the Best Young Novelist. One of his stories, "Liverpool Boys", is used in the SBS podcast series entitled True Stories, which showcases what SBS calls "Australia’s best emerging and early-career writers." He has published in HEAT, Westside and the Cultural Studies Review.

Intimate Antipathies, a collection of his essays was published in July 2019 by Giramondo, while a further collection, An Ordinary Ecstasy, was published in 2022.

=== Essay on Melbourne's literary scene ===
In 2016, Carman's essay on the Melbourne literary scene attracted international attention. An article in The Guardian stated what while "Australian creative industries are in crisis...[,] Luke Carman’s galvanising and venomous essay has started the wrong conversation" with his essay, a "jeremiad against the Melbourne literary scene that was published in the journal Meanjin. Carman's essay criticizes "arts administrators at creative institutions – journals, festivals, funding bodies and hubs", who he states are "anti-artists". Ben Eltham states that top arts administrators may earn higher salaries than the poorly-paid writers. At the journal Overland, Emmett Stinson stated that the "response [to the essay] has been overwhelmingly negative"; however, he stated that for "...all of its hyperbolic rhetoric, the essay is a call for a limited form of underclass literary revolt – and the studied refusal of a creeping professionalisation" in the writing world.

== See also ==
- Grunge lit
