= Tim Sinclair (author) =

Australian poet

Tim Sinclair (born 1972) is an Australian author of young adult fiction and poetry, resident in Sydney.

Sinclair was born in the Adelaide Hills, South Australia.

Best known for the verse novels Run and Nine Hours North (Penguin Books), he is also the author of the poetry collections Re:reading the dictionary and Vapour Trails, and a collaborator (with Ben Winch) on the spoken word concept album Brothers of the Head.

In addition to his creative work, Sinclair is active in arts administration, and has worked at Poets House, the Australian Society of Authors and the South Australian Writers' Centre. He is the poetry editor of PAN Magazine.

He has performed and taught regularly at schools and festivals.

== Bibliography ==
- Run (2013) ISBN 978-0-14-356768-4
- Re:reading the dictionary (2011) ISBN 978-0-9752077-2-7
- Nine Hours North (2006) ISBN 0-14-300376-3
- Vapour Trails (2005) ISBN 0-9752077-0-9
- Brothers of the Head (2004) ISBN 0-9752077-1-7
