= Limit-experience =

Concept in continental philosophy

In continental philosophy, limit-experience (French: expérience limite) is a quality of experience that approaches the limits of possible experience. This can be in terms of its intensity, and it being seemingly impossible or paradoxical. In Lacanianism, a limit-experience dissociates the subject from the experience that it exists in and identifies with, leading to a confrontation with the Real. The concept first appears in the work of Karl Jaspers and later, in the work of the French philosopher Georges Bataille; it subsequently became associated with French philosophers Maurice Blanchot and Michel Foucault through their use of the concept.

== Interpretations ==
=== Georges Bataille ===
When originally speaking on limit-experiences, Bataille drew inspiration from Charles Baudelaire and his poetics of paradoxical experience, such as in the line "O filthy grandeur! O sublime disgrace!" in poem 25 of Baudelaire's Les Fleurs du mal. He noted "the fact that these two complete contrasts were identical—divine ecstasy and extreme horror", and he went on to challenge the conventions laid down by the surrealists at the time with an anti-idealist philosophy conditioned on what he called "the impossible", defined by breaking "rules" until something beyond all rules was reached; Foucault would later summarize this as "the point of life which lies as close as possible to the impossibility of living, which lies at the limit or the extreme". Bataille sought to identify experiences of this kind, and to establish a philosophy that would convey how to live at the edge of limits where the ability to comprehend experience breaks down.

=== Michel Foucault ===
Foucault remarked that "the idea of a limit-experience that wrenches the subject from itself is what was important to me in my reading of Nietzsche, Bataille, and Blanchot". In his manner, the systems of philosophy and psychology and their conceptions of reality and the unified subject could be challenged and exposed in favor of what their systems and structures refused and excluded, viewing them from a standpoint informed by the potentials of limit-experience.

How far Foucault's fascination with intense experiences goes in his entire body of work is the subject of debate, with the concept arguably being absent from his later and more well known work on sexuality and discipline, as well as strongly associated with the cult of the mad artist in Madness and Civilization.

=== Jacques Lacan ===
Influenced by Bataille, from whom he drew the idea of impossibility, Lacan explored the role of limit-experiences, such as "desire, boredom, confinement, revolt, prayer, sleeplessness ... and panic" in the formation of the Other.

He also adopted some of Bataille's views on love, seeing it as predicated on man having previously "experienced the limit within which, like desire, he is bound". He saw masochism in particular as a limit-experience, an aspect which fed into his article "Kant avec Sade".

== See also ==
- Anguish
- Antonin Artaud
- Enantiodromia
- Eroticism
- Limit situation
- Metanoia
- Michel Leiris
- Negative capability
- Negative theology
- R. D. Laing
