= Anthony Macris =

Australian novelist, critic and academic (born 1962)

Anthony Macris (born 29 June 1962) is an Australian novelist, critic and academic. He has been shortlisted for the Prime Minister's Literary Awards, the Age Book of the Year, and been named a Sydney Morning Herald Best Young Australian Novelist. His creative work has been supported by grants from the Literature Board of the Australia Council. He is Associate Professor of Creative Writing at the University of Technology, Sydney. He has been a regular contributor of book reviews, feature articles and essays to the national media, principally in the area of international literary fiction. He has been called a post-grunge lit writer, a reference to an Australian literary genre from the 2000s which emerged following the 1990s grunge lit genre.

== Capital novels ==
The main concerns of the Capital novels are "the increasing penetration of market forces into everyday life" (Sydney Review of Books), and the effect of "the last several decades of capitalist ‘progress’ ... [on] ‘the life-worlds of ordinary people" (The Conversation).

In Capital, Volume One, Macris employs techniques from the French Nouveau Roman to produce a vital yet impersonal tracking of the movement of dead commodities in a London Underground train station. In this track of the novel, Macris presents a dystopia of the marketisation of quotidian, globalised life, alluding to Marx's study of the commodity form and to the journey of Leopold Bloom in Joyce's Ulysses. These impersonal chapters focused on the London Underground are contrasted with memoir-like fragments from a failed bildungsroman, in which assemblages of neoliberal capitalism—combining with pop musical and film culture, with the petroleum industry, with the higher education and restaurant sectors—are presented as both subject-forming and subject-de-forming. Working alongside the clearly critical intent of the novel is a joyful, disorienting experimentation with subject, time and place, producing something like a sublime rhythmic composition that, rather than falling into the negative, critical gravity of the novel's content, suggests ways out of this neoliberal dystopia.

== Awards ==
- 1998: Sydney Morning Herald Best Young Australian Novelist: listed for Capital, Volume One
- 1998: Commonwealth Writers’ Prize Best First Book: South-East Asian Section (shortlist): Capital, Volume One
- 2003: Sussex-Samuel Award, Australasian Languages and Literature Association: "Claude Simon and the Emergence of the Generative mise en abyme"
- 2011: Age Book of the Year (shortlist): When Horse Became Saw
- 2012: Prime Minister's Literary Awards: non-fiction (shortlist): When Horse Became Saw

== Bibliography ==
=== Fiction ===
- Capital, Volume One. Allen & Unwin, 1997. (2nd ed. UWAP 2013)
- Great Western Highway: a love story (Capital, Volume One, Part Two). UWAP, 2012
- Inexperience and other stories. UWAP, 2016

=== Non-fiction ===
- When Horse Became Saw: a family's journey through autism. Viking Penguin, 2011

=== Selected essays and journal articles ===
- 'The Novel, Sense-Making, And Mao', Sydney Review of Books
- 'Perception And Sensation In The Capital Novels: Representing the city in literature', Axon Journal
- 'The Immobilised Body: Stanley Kubrick's A Clockwork Orange', ScreeningThePast

=== Selected literary journalism ===
- "Against the Day". Sydney Morning Herald.
- "My Revolutions". Sydney Morning Herald.
- 'Falling Man', Sydney Morning Herald

== Interviews ==
- 'An Interview with Anthony Macris', Seizure
- 'Mounting the Fight: an interview with Anthony Macris', Verity La
- 'Living With Autism', 7.30 ABC TV
