= Carrion Colony =

2002 novel by Richard King

- Author: Richard King
- Language: English
- Genre: Novel
- Publisher: Allen & Unwin
- Publication date: 2002
- Publication place: Australia
- Media type: Print
- Pages: 261
- ISBN: 1865087602

Carrion Colony is a 2002 novel by Australian author Richard King, published by Allen & Unwin.

== Critical reception ==
A reviewer in The Age called Carrion Colony an "altogether more ambitious work" than King's debut novel, Kindling Does for Firewood, a book which won Australia's Vogel Award in 1995. The reviewer calls Carrion Colony a "...kind of semi-allegorical, post-modernist account of the early days of colonial settlement, written in a highly idiosyncratic, jocularly vulgar style", almost as if it was "Australian history as viewed by Mad magazine." The reviewer states that "[t]ime and place are deliberately confused and conflated" and the prose is "...highly mannered", but with "arse jokes and puns aplenty". The reviewer states that the "...post-modernist element in the novel" can be seen in the "shifting sense of time and place but in the narrator's self-conscious intrusions". The reviewer calls it "willed, cerebral stuff".
