= Ben Winch =

Australian writer and musician (born 1973)

Benjamin Roy Winch, also known by the stage name Light Traveller, is an Australian writer and musician. He performed in the alternative rock band Movement from 1990 to 1992, before starting to write fiction. His books include Liadhen, My Boyfriend's Father and Vanishing Points.

== Early life ==
Winch was born in Adelaide, and grew up in the Adelaide Hills of South Australia.

== Career ==
His first novel Liadhen was shortlisted in the 1994 Angus and Robertson Bookworld First Novel Award, and published by Wakefield Press in 1995. Although heralded as part of the first wave of the Australian Grunge Lit movement, Liadhen is in fact a dreamlike and non-realistic story set in a fictional town in the Australian Alps, and incorporating few of the traits of urban-based dirty realism that characterised that movement.

Winch's next novel, My Boyfriend's Father (Wakefield Press, 1996), was closer to the grunge mould. A first-person narrative told by a young female, My Boyfriend's Father documents the break-up of a family owing to drug and alcohol abuse and was shortlisted in both the 1996 New South Wales Premier's Literary Awards, Christina Stead Prize for Fiction and the inaugural Kathleen Mitchell Award. In 1996 Winch also appeared at Adelaide Writers' Week and became the youngest ever recipient of a Fellowship for Literature from the Australia Council for the Arts.

In the winter of 1997 Winch moved to Tasmania to work on the multi-genre pulp triptych Vanishing Points, which emerged under a pseudonym via COQ & CO Books & Music in 2012.

In 2004 he returned to the Australian literary scene briefly via a spoken word/music collaboration with Adelaide poet Tim Sinclair entitled Brothers of the Head, a concept album about an unborn foetus trapped in his brother's skull.

From 2004 to 2006 he released short-run CDRs of improvisational rock and lo-fi via Cottage Industry Recordings.

In 2009 he moved to Manchester, England, where he formed the band Shadow History with ex-Icicle Works bassist Chris Layhe.

Since 2015 Winch has been recording under the name Light Traveller. An EP, Same Stars Shine, was released in London in 2017. An LP, Falcon Falling, was due for release in 2018.

== Bibliography ==
- Liadhen (1995) ISBN 1862543437
- My Boyfriend's Father (1996) ISBN 1862543712
- Brothers of the Head (2004) ISBN 0143003763
- Vanishing Points (2012) ISBN 9781499313185
