= Murray Waldren =

Australian journalist, editor and writer

Murray Waldren is an Australian journalist, editor and writer. He has written for The Australian, an Australian newspaper for over two decades. He has written "...literary profiles, interviews, reviews, reports and columns" for The Australian, The Weekend Australian and The Weekend Australian Magazine. Waldren runs the Literary Liaisons website. He has served as a judge for several writing awards, including The Australian/Vogels Awards, the NSW Premiers Award, the ABC Fiction Award and the Miles Franklin Literary Award.

== Publications ==
In 1972, Waldren wrote Ratatouille with David Peacock and Trevor Marshall; it was published by Tomato Press. In 1997, the book To Build A Bridge, which he co-wrote with David Moore, was published. In 1999 he edited the book Future Tense, which was published by Allen & Unwin. He wrote the true crime book Moran V Moran, which was shortlisted for Best True Crime award and for the Crime Writers' Association of Australia Ned Kelly Awards in 2002. His book Confessions of a Dog's Godfather in Acts of Dog was published by Random House in 2003. Waldren wrote The Mind and Times of Reg Mombassa. It made the shortlist for the Australian Book Industry Awards Illustrated Book of the Year award in 2010 and for The Galley Club Awards for Excellence award in that same year. His book Dining Out with Mr Lunch collects together Waldren's literary profile; it was published by University of Queensland Press.

== See also ==
- Grunge lit
