= Limit situation =

Situation with unordinary experiences

A limit situation (German: Grenzsituation) is any of certain situations in which a human being is said to have experiences that differ from those arising from ordinary situations.

The concept was developed by Karl Jaspers, who considered fright, guilt, finality and suffering as some of the key limit situations arising in everyday life.

== Encounters ==
James G. Hart wrote that encounters with limit situations unsettle individuals, break them out of their inauthentic identifications, remove them from the social bond, and force them to come alive and find new ways of communicating. They can be compared to the similarly generative experience of the sense of bewilderment in Zen. Hans-Georg Gadamer believed the limit situation to provide a revelatory encounter with the other and that facing the anxiety arising from the foreknowledge of death can likewise be a growth opportunity arising from a limit situation.

== Psychoanalytic frame ==
Psychoanalysis can be seen as a structured limit situation, the psychoanalytic framework in particular providing an experience of finality and limits that can empower growth.

== Third world politics ==
In his book Pedagogy of the Oppressed, Paulo Freire adapted the existential notion of limit situations to the Third World, seeing the constraints of underdevelopment as a limit situation on humanity, but also as a possible frontier point for increasing (in overcoming) one's human stature. Limit-situation is a fundamental concept in critical pedagogy, originally formulated by Paulo Freire, which describes the existential and social circumstances that impede, bar, or hinder an individual's pursuit of their "ontological vocation" to be "more fully human". These situations act as restricting dimensions that limit people's cognitive, social, and emotional development.

== See also ==
- Affliction
- Antinomianism
- Epiphany (feeling)
- Existential crisis
- Liminality
- Limit-experience
- Numinosity

== Bibliography ==
- Richardson A. & Bowden J. (1993) The Westminster Dictionary of Christian Theology London; Westminster John Knox Press
