= Metanoia (psychology) =

Fundamental change in the human personality (psychology)

In psychology, metanoia (from the Greek word μετάνοια, metanoia, meaning “changing one's mind” or “repentance”) refers to a process of fundamental psychological transformation, often precipitated by crisis, breakdown, or existential conflict. It denotes a shift in an individual’s perception of self, others, or life itself—typically involving disintegration of an old identity followed by the emergence of a reorganized, more integrated self.

The term derives from the Ancient Greek words μετά (metá) (meaning "beyond" or "after") and νόος (noeō) (meaning "perception" or "understanding" or "mind"), and takes on different meanings in different contexts. It is widely used in the Greek New Testament, where it is commonly translated into English as "repentance". Key appearances include Mark 1:15, Luke 15:7, and Acts 2:38, where it signifies not only remorse but a radical change in one’s life-orientation, a spiritual and existential turning point. In early Christian theology, metanoia came to represent both a momentary and lifelong process of spiritual transformation.

== Development in psychology ==
Modern psychological theorists such as William James (1842-1910) and Carl Gustav Jung (1875-1961) described processes that align with the concept of metanoia, though they did not use the term directly in their writings.

In The Varieties of Religious Experience (1902), James explored cases of religious conversion characterized by despair, surrender, and a sense of rebirth. He described such transformations as the emergence of a “twice-born” self—a term referring to individuals who find renewed meaning after profound inner turmoil. Although James did not use the Greek term metanoia, his analysis of spiritual and psychological transformation has been retrospectively interpreted by some psychotherapists as congruent with the concept.

In Memories, Dreams, Reflections (1962), Jung described the psyche's ability to self-correct through disintegration and reintegration, a spontaneous attempt of the psyche to heal itself of unbearable conflict by melting down and then being reborn in a more adaptive form – a form of self healing often associated with the mid-life crisis and psychotic breakdown, which could be viewed as a potentially productive process. Jung considered that psychotic episodes in particular could be understood as an existential crisis which might be an attempt at self-reparation: such instances could represent a shift in the balance of the personality away from the persona towards the shadow and the self. His theory of individuation involves moving through shadow material and inner conflict toward wholeness. Jung did not use the term metanoia, but post-Jungian theorists later adopted the term to describe this self-transformative process.

== R. D. Laing and modern use ==
The term metanoia was explicitly introduced into psychology by R. D. Laing in The Politics of Experience (1967). Laing used it to describe a process in which individuals undergoing psychotic episodes may experience not simply breakdown, but potential breakthrough—a restructuring of consciousness and identity. He emphasized that what is often labeled as "madness" can, under certain conditions, be part of a healing process, rather than merely pathological.

“Metanoia … is a natural process through which a person may go in order to achieve a greater degree of sanity.” — R. D. Laing (1967)

Jung's concepts heavily influenced Laing, particularly his emphasis on the dissolution and replacement of everyday ego consciousness.

Laing's colleague David Cooper considered that "metanoia means change from the depths of oneself upwards into the superficies of one's social appearance" – a process that in the second of its three stages "generates the 'signs' of depression and mourning".

== Therapeutic applications ==
Later psychotherapists, particularly Petrushka Clarkson in On Psychotherapy (1993), expanded the application of metanoia within integrative and transpersonal frameworks. Clarkson applied the term metanoia to the experience of a fundamental and stable change in an individual's life-orientation. Clarkson described it as a potentially therapeutic phenomenon involving deep restructuring of the personality, often following emotional collapse or existential crisis. She referenced William James’s conversion cases as illustrative of metanoia-like processes.

Similarly influenced was the therapeutic community movement. Ideally, it aimed to support people whilst they broke down and went through spontaneous healing, rather than thwarting such efforts at self-repair by strengthening a person's existing character defences and thereby maintaining the underlying conflict.

The Dutch psychiatrist Jan Foudraine wrote extensively about it, tracing its history through the work of Jung and Laing, and eventually considering it "a permanent change in gestalt". He cites an example where one sees a black vase, then one blinks, and instead one sees two white faces in profile opposite each other (the Rubin vase).

The concept has found continued relevance in Jungian, existential, and transpersonal psychotherapies, where it denotes deep, often painful inner transformation that leads to renewal or self-integration.

In transactional analysis, metanoia is used to describe the experience of abandoning an old scripted self or false self for a more open one: a process which may be marked by a mixture of intensity, despair, self-surrender, and an encounter with the inner void.

While not widely used in mainstream clinical psychology, metanoia remains influential in approaches that emphasize meaning-making, spiritual crisis, and psychospiritual growth.

== See also ==
- Backfire effect
- Cognitive dissonance
- Enantiodromia
- Limit-experience
- Metanoia (theology)
- Positive disintegration
- Twelve-step program
