= Kindling Does for Firewood =

Novel by Richard King

Kindling Does for Firewood is a novel by Australian writer Richard King, published by Allen & Unwin Academic (ISBN 978-1-86448-168-6). The novel, King's debut, won the Australian/Vogel Literary Award in 1995. A review in Publishers Weekly states that the "clearly talented" author used experimental/stream-of-consciousness monologues. The reviewer states that King "...aims for a flip tone in this debut chronicle of slackers in Melbourne, Australia". The review states that the romance between a female postsecondary student, Margaret and a male bookstore clerk, William, is "doomed from the start". Margaret is from a regular middle-class family, but Peter lives with unemployed roommates who only consume beer and drugs. The unemployed roommates are somewhat like the Lost Boys from the Peter Pan stories; King acknowledges the influence of the Peter Pan stories in his work.

Paul Dawson, commenting on the Australian Vogel Awards, stated that the $20,000 award "...can be seen as a barometer of cultural preoccupations, mapping shifts at the edges of literary culture: here is where the direction of young writing appears to be moving, or at least where judges and publishers want it to move." Dawson states that "[i]t could be argued that Richard King's lightweight Kindling Does for Firewood was a safe option [for the Vogel Award givers] in the wake of the [Helen] Demidenko scandal in 1995." The Helen Demidenko scandal involved her Vogel Award in 1993 for The Hand That Signed the Paper, "contributing to public debates about the responsibility of writing history". The Hand that Signed the Paper is about a Ukrainian family trying to survive a decade of Stalinist purges and state-imposed poverty and famine. When the media discovered Helen Dale's identity and legal name, this promoted much debate on the nature of identity, ethnicity, and authenticity in Australian literature.

== Author ==
Richard King was born in Melbourne in 1968. He studied arts at Monash University, with a major in politics and philosophy. In addition to several plays, he wrote a second novel, Carrion Colony.
