= Enantiodromia =

Principle introduced by Carl Jung

Enantiodromia (Ancient Greek: ἐναντίος, romanized: enantíos – "opposite" and δρόμος, drómos – "running course") is a principle introduced in the West by psychiatrist Carl Jung. In Psychological Types, Jung defines enantiodromia as "the emergence of the unconscious opposite in the course of time." It is similar to the principle of equilibrium in the natural world, in that any extreme is opposed by the system in order to restore balance. When things get to their extreme, they turn into their opposite. Jung adds that "this characteristic phenomenon practically always occurs when an extreme, one-sided tendency dominates conscious life; in time an equally powerful counterposition is built up which first inhibits the conscious performance and subsequently breaks through the conscious control."

This principle was explicitly understood and discussed in the principles of traditional Chinese religion, as in Taoism and yin-yang. A central premise of the I Ching is that yang lines become yin when they have reached their extreme, and vice versa. However, in Jungian terms, a thing psychically transmogrifies into its shadow opposite, in the repression of psychic forces that are thereby cathected into something powerful and threatening.

== Overview ==
Jung was heavily influenced by Friedrich Nietzsche, and Nietzsche discusses this idea in several areas of his works: Human, All Too Human Aphorism 1, 2 and 3; Beyond Good and Evil Aphorism 2.

The word "enantiodromia" was apparently coined by Aetius, but the concept is also implied in Heraclitus's writings. In DK fragment 126 for example, Heraclitus says "cold things warm, warm things cool, wet things dry and parched things get wet." It also seems implicit in other of his sayings, like "war is father of all, king of all" (fr. 53), "they do not know that the differing/opposed thing agrees with itself; harmony is reflexive (παλίντροπος palintropos, used of a compound bow, or "in reflexive tension"), like the bow and the lyre" (fr. 51). In these passages and others the idea of the coincidence of opposites is clearly articulated in Heraclitus' characteristic riddling style, as well as the dynamic motion back and forth between the two, generated especially by opposition and conflict.

Jung himself wrote: "Old Heraclitus, who was indeed a very great sage, discovered the most marvellous of all psychological laws: the regulative function of opposites. He called it enantiodromia, a running contrariwise, by which he meant that sooner or later everything runs into its opposite."

Roughly a generation later, Plato in the Phaedo articulated the principle clearly: "Everything arises in this way, opposites from their opposites." (sect. 71a).

Since Jung's modern recognition of it many centuries later, it has been actively portrayed in modern culture. For example, it has been applied to the subject of the film The Lives of Others, to show how one devoted to a communist regime breaks through his loyalty and emerges a humanist.

In particular, Jung used the term to refer to the unconscious acting against the wishes of the conscious mind, updating the Greek concept of akrasia in modern psychological terms. (Aspects of the Masculine, chapter 7, paragraph 294).

Enantiodromia. Literally, "running counter to," referring to the emergence of the unconscious opposite in the course of time. This characteristic phenomenon practically always occurs when an extreme, one-sided tendency dominates conscious life; in time an equally powerful counterposition is built up, which first inhibits the conscious performance and subsequently breaks through the conscious control. ("Definitions," ibid., par. 709)

Enantiodromia is typically experienced in conjunction with symptoms associated with acute neurosis, and often foreshadows a rebirth of the personality.

The grand plan on which the unconscious life of the psyche is constructed is so inaccessible to our understanding that we can never know what evil may not be necessary in order to produce good by enantiodromia, and what good may very possibly lead to evil. ("The Phenomenology of the Spirit in Fairytales", Collected Works 9i, par. 397)

Enantiodromia also refers to the process whereby one seeks out and embraces an opposing quality from within, internalizing it in a way that results in individual wholeness. This process is the crux of Jung's notion called the "path of individuation." One must incorporate an opposing archetype into their psyche to obtain a state of internal 'completion.'

== See also ==
- Antipodes
- Dialectical materialism
- Dialectical monism
- Homeopathy
- Homeostasis
- Metanoia
- Ouroboros
- Yin-yang
