= Andrew McCann =

Australian professor and fiction writer

Andrew McCann is an Australian professor and fiction writer. He used the pen name "A. L. McCann" for his first book, The White Body of Evening, to avoid confusion with fellow Australian writer Andrew McGahan. His second fiction book, Subtopia, is a coming-of-age novel that takes place in "south-eastern suburbs in the 1970s, St Kilda in the 1980s and Berlin in the 1990s." He is an associate professor of English at Dartmouth College. He has been called a post-grunge lit writer, a reference to an Australian literary genre from the 2000s which emerged following the 1990s grunge lit genre.
