= Paul Dawson (professor) =

Australian writer

Paul Dawson (born 1972) is an Australian writer of poetry and fiction and a scholar in the fields of narrative theory and the study of creative writing. He is an associate professor at the University of New South Wales in the School of the Arts and Media. He teaches creative Writing (including play writing), literary theory, North American Literature, and British and Irish Literature.

== Career ==
Dawson holds a PhD from the University of Melbourne and an MA in Writing from the University of Queensland. His first book of poems is entitled Imagining Winter; it was published by Interactive Press in 2006. This book garnered the 2006 national IP Picks Best Poetry Award. His book on the rise and spread of creative writing programs, Creative Writing and the New Humanities (Routledge, 2005) has been called a "...thorough and perceptive account of this history and [its] debates". Dawson has been invited to provide commentary on popular culture. He has participated in various literary festivals and panels.

In 2014, he was a visiting scholar at Aarhus University in Denmark. Dawson was part of the university's narrative research lab, a project which investigates "...narrative in various media and art forms; its forms, techniques and voices, its cross medial potential and its relations to different cultural discourses."

His poems have appeared in anthologies such as Contemporary Asian Australian Poets (Puncher and Wattmann, 2013), The Newcastle Poetry Prize Anthology (2016), and Harbour City Poems: Sydney in Verse 1788-2008 (Puncher & Wattmann, 2009). He has published short stories and poems in journals and newspapers, including: Meanjin, Island, Southerly, Overland, Australian Poetry Journal, Mascara Literary Review, Snorkel, Slope (a US journal), Australian Poetry Anthology, The Sleeper's Almanac, Blue Dog: Australian Poetry, Imago: New Writing, and The Sydney Morning Herald.

His book The Return of the Omniscient Narrator: Authorship and Authority in Twenty-first Century Fiction was published by OSU Press, 2013. The book is about literary omniscience. His book Creative Writing and the New Humanities (Routledge, 2005) is about creative writing programs. Dawson's research uses novel studies and narrative theory. He has served as the guest editor of "Narrative Theory and the History of the Novel". His research includes work on "authorial intrusions"; how authors use "first person perspective" to depict death, dying in the first person'; and the representation of female thoughts.

== Books ==
- The Return of the Omniscient Narrator: Authorship and Authority in Twenty-first Century Fiction. Columbus: Ohio State University Press, 2013.
- Imagining Winter. Brisbane: Interactive Press, 2006.
- Creative Writing and the New Humanities. London/New York: Routledge, 2005.

== Chapters ==
- “How Many ‘Turns’ Does it Take to Change a Discipline: Narratology and the Interdisciplinary Rhetoric of the Narrative Turn.” Emerging Vectors of Narratology. Eds Per Krogh Hansen, John Pier, Philippe Roussin and Wolf Schmid. Narratologia series. Berlin: De Gruyter, 2017. 405-34.
- “Fictional ‘Word Bytes’.” Word Bytes: Writing in the Information Society. Ed. Carolyne Lee. Melbourne: Melbourne University Press, 2009. 138-56.
- “The Future of Creative Writing.” The Creative Writing Handbook. Ed. Steve Earnshaw. Edinburgh: University of Edinburgh Press, 2007. 78-90.
- “Writers, Critics, and Literary Authority.” Creative Writing: Theory Beyond Practice. Eds Nigel Krauth and Tess Brady. Brisbane: Post Pressed, 2006. 21-31.

== Journal articles ==
- "Fictional Minds and Female Sexuality: The Consciousness Scene from Pamela to Lady Chatterley's Lover." ELH (English Literary History) (forthcoming).
- "Narrativizing Novel Studies, Historicizing Narrative Theory." Introduction to special issue on Narrative Theory and the History of the Novel. Poetics Today 39.1 (2018): (forthcoming).
- "Delving into the Narratological 'Toolbox': Concepts and Categories in Narrative Theory." Style 51.2 (2017): 228-46.
- "From Digressions to Intrusions: Authorial Commentary in the Novel." Studies in the Novel 48.2 (2016): 145-67.
- "Ten Theses Against Fictionality." Narrative 23.1 (2015): 74-100.
- "Style, the Narrating Instance, and the 'Trace' of Writing." Style 47.4 (2013): 466-89.
- “Emerging Vectors of Narratology: Toward Consolidation or Diversification? (A Response).” Enthymema 9 (2013): 109-<114http://riviste.unimi.it/index.php/enthymema/article/view/3533/3708>
- “Real Readers and Real Authors: Omniscient Narration and a Discursive Approach to the Narrative Communication Model.” Journal of Narrative Theory 42.1 (2012): 91-116.
- “The Return of Omniscience in Contemporary Fiction.” Narrative 17.2 (May 2009): 143-161. (it was the winner of 2010 Prize for Best Essay published in Narrative. An Italian translation published in Enthymema 13 (2015): 37-63)
- “State of Play: Australian Poetry and Poetics Now.” Five Bells: Australian Poetry 15.4 & 16.1 (2009): 30-39.
- “Historicizing Craft in the Teaching of Fiction.” New Writing: International Journal for the Practice and Theory of Creative Writing 5.3 (2008): 211-224.
- “Creative Writing and Postmodern Interdisciplinarity.” TEXT 12.1 (2008) <http://www.textjournal.com.au/april08/dawson.htm>
- "What is a Literary Intellectual?: Creative Writing and the New Humanities." Cultural Studies Review 9.1 (2003): 161-79.
- “Towards a New Poetics in Creative Writing Pedagogy.” TEXT 7.1 (2003) <http://www.gu.edu.au/school/art/text/april03/dawson.htm>
- "A Place for the Space Between: Fictocriticism and the University." Westerly 47 (2002): 139-51.
- "Creative Writing in Australia: The Development of a Discipline." TEXT 5.1 (2001) <http://www.gu.edu.au/school/art/text/april01/dawson.htm>.
- “Writing Programmes in Australian Universities: Creative Art or Literary Research?” TEXT 3.1 (1999) <http://www.gu.edu.au/school/art/text/april99/dawson.htm>.
- “Poetics in the Discipline of Creative Writing.” Southerly 58.4 (1998–99): 8-21.
- “Grunge Lit: Marketing Generation X.” Meanjin 56.1 (1997): 119-25.
- “The Function of Critical Theory in Tertiary Creative Writing Programmes." Southern Review 30.1 (1997): 70-80.

== Poetry ==
- "Ten Poetic Commandments." Island Magazine 149 (2017): 88-9.
- "Lover Nature." Covert Plants. Ed Prudence Gibson and Baylee Britts. Santa Barbara: Punctum Books, 2017.
- "The Wreck of the Heartland." Mascara Literary Review 20 (April 2017): <http://mascarareview.com/5781-2/>
- “Five Lines Can Say Only.” Australian Poetry Journal 6.2 (2016): 113.
- “Declaration of the Rights of Rights.” The Dangar Island Garbage Boat: Newcastle Poetry Prize Anthology 2016. Newcastle: Hunter Writers Centre, 2016. 101-104.
- "Fictionality." Meanjin 75.1 (2016): 89. https://meanjin.com.au/poetry/fictionality/
- "Musing." Australian Poetry Anthology. Volume 4. Eds Sarah Holland-Batt and Brook Emery. Melbourne: Australian Poetry Ltd, 2015. 96-97.
- “Reading Hopkins,” “Dickinson’s Envelope”, “Possible Worlds”, Sydney”, “Thanks for the Poems, Pauline Hanson” (extract). Contemporary Asian Australian Poets. Eds Adam Aitken, Kim Boey Cheng, and Michelle Cahill. Sydney: Puncher and Wattmann, 2013.
- “Possible Worlds.” Australian Poetry Journal 1.1 (2011): 18.
- “Lines of Desire.” Snorkel 12 (October 2010) <http://snorkel.org.au/012/contents.html>
- “Thanks for the Poems, Pauline Hanson” (extract). Harbour City Poems: Sydney in Verse 1788-2008. Ed. Martin Langford. Sydney: Puncher and Wattmann, 2009. 205-206.
- “Daybreak.” Southerly 66.1 (2006): 43-44.
- “Imagining Winter.” Blue Dog: Australian Poetry 2.4 (2003): 38.
- "Sydney," "Adrift", "Gutter Buns." Slope 15 (2002) <http://www.slope.org/archive/issue15/index.phtml?url=dawson>
- "Anthropomorphism," "Morningside," "Yabbering Sextons," "Thanks for the Poems, Pauline Hanson," and "Lunatic Brothel." Recent Australian Poetry section of Slope 11-12 (July to October 2001) <http://www.slope.org/archive/eleven/dawson.html>
- “Show Me the Rain.” The Sydney Morning Herald 3 October 1998: Spectrum 12.
- “Tonight.” Good Time, Great Place: Between U&S 5. Ed. UTS Writers’ Group. Sydney: University of Technology, Sydney, 1992. 140-52.

== Fiction ==
- “Australian Academic.” Overland 206 (2012): 65-71.<http://overland.org.au/previous-issues/issue-206/fiction-paul-dawson/>
- “Countershading.” Sleepers Almanac No. 7 (2011). 345-9.
- “The Death of a Beautiful Woman” (extract from novel in progress). Southerly 70.2 (2010): 144-58.
- “A Gun in Your Pocket.” Island 96 (2004): 133-136.
- “Thomas Pennington’s Fetich.” Meanjin 63.1 (2004): 200-210
- "Traffic.” Imago: New Writing 11.3 (1999): 53-7.
- “Who Are You Calling Bohemian?” Sydney City Hub 2.35 (April 1997): 9.

== Reviews ==
- “Rev. of The Other Way Out by Bronwyn Lea.” Blue Dog: Australian Poetry 7.14 (2008): 49-57.
- “Rev. of Skinned by Light: Poems 1989-2002 by Anthony Lawrence.” Blue Dog: Australian Poetry 2.3 (2003): 72-73.
- "Rev. of The Artist is a Thief by Stephen Gray." TEXT 6.1 (2002) <http://www.gu.edu.au/school/art/text/april02/dawson.htm>.
