= Praise (novel) =

Book by Andrew McGahan

- Author: Andrew McGahan
- Published: Allen and Unwin 1992
- Publication place: Australia

Praise is the first novel of Australian author Andrew McGahan which won The Australian/Vogel Literary Award in 1991 for unpublished manuscripts and the Commonwealth Writers' Prize for Best First Book. Inspired by the writings of Charles Bukowski, the semi-autobiographical account of a doomed, drug and alcohol-fuelled relationship became an Australian bestseller, and is often credited with launching the short-lived "grunge lit" movement – terminology that McGahan himself (along with most of the writers to whom it was applied) rejected.

== Synopsis ==
As the story begins, narrator Gordon Buchanan quits his job at a drive-through bottle shop in Brisbane. He and his live-in girlfriend Cynthia LaMonde, a waitress, inhabit a world of casual sex, plentiful drugs and partying till dawn, pastimes that don't really give Gordon much pleasure, plagued as he is by a sense of being unfulfilled. Love affairs gone bad and fantasies undercut by reality are the norm for a generation that stops doing something the moment it becomes work, that wants to win without competing because making an effort would render victory meaningless.

The book’s hero is the laid-back Gordon, a chain-smoking asthmatic sweating under the Brisbane sun and scuttling his days away in a ramshackle guest house populated by itinerants and the elderly. Into Gordon’s world comes the loud, vivacious and wholly uncompromising Cynthia, his polar opposite in almost every way. They soon move in together, and begin a relationship built on a foundation of sex, booze, cigarettes, self-doubt and a singularly battered brand of love.

== Critical reception ==
Praise became a bestseller in Australia in the years following its publication and the award of the Commonwealth Writers' Prize for Best First Book. On its U. S release the influential Kirkus Review wrote: "Nothing life-affirming here--this prize-winning Australian first novel, straightforward and effective, immerses us in the drugs, sex, and general ennui of slackers Down Under. A bestseller in Australia, but without the superficial glamour of a Less Than Zero (to which its US publishers would like it compared). Unlikely to achieve the same success here, but, still, a bold novel, distinct voice, and impressive debut."

In Review called it part of "Brisbane’s Holy Trinity of Gen X Lit... your grungy, I’m gonna-drink-smoke-and-root-a-lot-because-I’m-lost kind of book from the School of Charles Bukowski."

== Film adaptation ==
In 1998, Praise was made into a film by first time producer Martha Coleman and fellow first-timer John Curran directed. Curran cast film novices Peter Fenton (frontman of rock group Crow) and Sacha Horler (a new National Institute of Dramatic Art graduate at the time) in the highly challenging lead roles of Gordon and Cynthia. The crew was a mix of newcomers and experienced old stagers. Praise received ten AFI Award nominations.
