= Literary realism =

Literary genre and movement

Literary realism is a movement and genre of literature that attempts to represent mundane and ordinary subject-matter in a faithful and straightforward way, avoiding grandiose or exotic subject matters, exaggerated portrayals, and speculative elements such as supernatural events and alternative worlds. It encompasses both fiction (realistic fiction) and nonfiction writing. Literary realism is a subset of the broader realist art movement that began with mid-nineteenth-century French literature (Stendhal) and Russian literature (Alexander Pushkin). It attempts to represent familiar things, including everyday activities and experiences, as they truly are.

== Background ==
Broadly defined as "the representation of reality", realism in the arts is the attempt to represent subject matter truthfully, without artificiality and avoiding artistic conventions, as well as implausible, exotic and supernatural elements. Realism has been prevalent in the arts at many periods, and is in large part a matter of technique and training, and the avoidance of stylization. In the visual arts, illusionistic realism is the accurate depiction of lifeforms, perspective, and the details of light and colour. Realist works of art may emphasize the ugly or sordid, such as works of social realism, regionalism, or kitchen sink realism. There have been various realism movements in the arts, such as the opera style of verismo, literary realism, theatrical realism and Italian neorealist cinema. The realism art movement in painting began in France in the 1850s, after the 1848 Revolution. The realist painters rejected Romanticism, which had come to dominate French literature and art, with roots in the late 18th century.

Realism as a movement in literature was a post-1848 phenomenon, according to its first theorist Jules-François Champfleury. It aims to reproduce "objective reality", and focuses on showing every day, quotidian activities and life, primarily among the middle- or lower-class society, without romantic idealization or dramatization. It may be regarded as the general attempt to depict subjects as they are considered to exist in third person objective reality, without embellishment or interpretation and "in accordance with secular, empirical rules." As such, the approach inherently implies a belief that such reality is ontologically independent of man's conceptual schemes, linguistic practices and beliefs, and thus can be known (or knowable) to the artist, who can in turn represent this 'reality' faithfully. As literary critic Ian Watt states in The Rise of the Novel, modern realism "begins from the position that truth can be discovered by the individual through the senses" and as such "it has its origins in Descartes and Locke, and received its first full formulation by Thomas Reid in the middle of the eighteenth century."

In the Introduction to The Human Comedy (1842) Balzac "claims that poetic creation and scientific creation are closely related activities, manifesting the tendency of realists towards taking over scientific methods". The artists of realism used the achievements of contemporary science, the strictness and precision of the scientific method, in order to understand reality. The positivist spirit in science presupposes feeling contempt towards metaphysics, the cult of the fact, experiment and proof, confidence in science and the progress that it brings, as well as striving to give a scientific form to studying social and moral phenomena."

In the late 18th century Romanticism was a revolt against the aristocratic social and political norms of the previous Age of Reason and a reaction against the scientific rationalization of nature found in the dominant philosophy of the 18th century, as well as a reaction to the Industrial Revolution. It was embodied most strongly in the visual arts, music, and literature, but had a major impact on historiography, education and the natural sciences.

19th-century realism was in its turn a reaction to Romanticism, and for this reason it is also commonly derogatorily referred to as traditional or "bourgeois realism". However, not all writers of Victorian literature produced works of realism. The rigidities, conventions, and other limitations of Victorian realism prompted in their turn the revolt of modernism. Starting around 1900, the driving motive of modernist literature was the criticism of the 19th-century bourgeois social order and world view, which was countered with an antirationalist, antirealist and antibourgeois program.

== Sub-genres of literary realism ==
=== Social Realism ===
Social realism is an international art movement that includes the work of painters, printmakers, photographers and filmmakers who draw attention to the everyday conditions of the working classes and the poor, and who are critical of the social structures that maintain these conditions. While the movement's artistic styles vary from nation to nation, it almost always uses a form of descriptive or critical realism.

Kitchen sink realism (or kitchen sink drama) is a term coined to describe a British cultural movement that developed in the late 1950s and early 1960s in theatre, art, novels, film and television plays, which used a style of social realism. Its protagonists usually could be described as angry young men, and it often depicted the domestic situations of working-class Britons living in cramped rented accommodation and spending their off-hours drinking in grimy pubs, to explore social issues and political controversies.

The films, plays and novels employing this style are set frequently in poorer industrial areas in the North of England, and use the rough-hewn speaking accents and slang heard in those regions. The film It Always Rains on Sunday (1947) is a precursor of the genre, and the John Osborne play Look Back in Anger (1956) is thought of as the first of the genre. The gritty love-triangle of Look Back in Anger, for example, takes place in a cramped, one-room flat in the English Midlands. The conventions of the genre have continued into the 2000s, finding expression in such television shows as Coronation Street and EastEnders.

In art, "Kitchen Sink School" was a term used by critic David Sylvester to describe painters who depicted social realist–type scenes of domestic life.

=== Socialist realism ===
Socialist realism is the official Soviet art form that was institutionalized by Joseph Stalin in 1934 and was later adopted by allied Communist parties worldwide. This form of realism held that successful art depicts and glorifies the proletariat's struggle toward socialist progress. The Statute of the Union of Soviet Writers in 1934 stated that socialist realism

is the basic method of Soviet literature and literary criticism. It demands of the artist the truthful, historically concrete representation of reality in its revolutionary development. Moreover, the truthfulness and historical concreteness of the artistic representation of reality must be linked with the task of ideological transformation and education of workers in the spirit of socialism.

The strict adherence to the above tenets, however, began to crumble after the death of Stalin when writers started expanding the limits of what is possible. However, the changes were gradual since the social realism tradition was so ingrained into the psyche of the Soviet literati that even dissidents followed the habits of this type of composition, rarely straying from its formal and ideological mold. The Soviet socialist realism did not exactly emerge on the very day it was promulgated in the Soviet Union in 1932 by way of a decree that abolished independent writers' organizations. This movement had existed for at least fifteen years and was first seen during the Bolshevik Revolution. The 1934 declaration only formalized its canonical formulation through the speeches of the Andrei Zhdanov, the representative of the Party's Central Committee.

The official definition of socialist realism has been criticized for its conflicting framework. While the concept itself is simple, discerning scholars struggle in reconciling its elements. According to Peter Kenez, "it was impossible to reconcile the teleological requirement with realistic presentation," further stressing that "the world could either be depicted as it was or as it should be according to theory, but the two are obviously not the same."

=== Naturalism ===
Naturalism was a literary movement or tendency from the 1880s to 1930s that used detailed realism to suggest that social conditions, heredity, and environment had inescapable force in shaping human character. It was a mainly unorganized literary movement that sought to depict believable everyday reality, as opposed to such movements as Romanticism or Surrealism, in which subjects may receive highly symbolic, idealistic or even supernatural treatment.

Naturalism was an outgrowth of literary realism, influenced by Charles Darwin's theory of evolution. Whereas realism seeks only to describe subjects as they really are, naturalism also attempts to determine "scientifically" the underlying forces (e.g., the environment or heredity) influencing the actions of its subjects. Naturalistic works often include supposed sordid subject matter, for example, Émile Zola's Rougon-Macquart's treatment of sexuality, as well as pervasive pessimism. Naturalistic works tend to focus on the darker aspects of life, including poverty, racism, violence, prejudice, disease, corruption, prostitution, and filth. As a result, naturalistic writers were frequently criticized for focusing too much on human vice and misery.

=== Verismo ===
Verismo (from Italian vero, meaning 'true, real') was an Italian literary movement which aimed to describe reality. Its main representatives were Giovanni Verga and Luigi Capuana, regarded as the authors of a "manifesto" of the genre. Among other exponents were Matilde Serao and 1926 Nobel Prize winner Grazia Deledda (see main article for more).

Protagonists of the genre were often (yet not always) poor, disadvantaged and scarcely educated people, who struggled against adversities. They often came from popular environments and their lifestyle was challenged by the progress that society was experiencing in the late 19th century; such characters usually could not adapt themselves to that progress. Other times, the protagonists were Bourgeois.
Verismo was inspired by French Naturalism, but differed from it in a significant way: in fact, Naturalist authors were more optimistic and believed that literature could have an influence on society and its development, therefore conceived the writer's role as charged with moral responsibilities and this is reflected in their works, which usually present comments by the authors and digressions where they express their opinion about the way their characters act. This does not happen in Verismo: in fact, Verist authors such as Giovanni Verga usually believe that reality cannot be changed through literature, so they do not make any comment on their characters and tend to distance themselves from the narration, by adopting an objective, non-intrusive perspective (yet the authors somehow manage to let the readers understand their point of view). A typical feature of Verismo is the usage of a language which coincides with the characters' social condition and their level of education: therefore, if the protagonists of the story are e.g., peasants, they will use a popular, lowbrow language; middle class characters will speak in a higher, more raffinate way. The works often present terms deriving from vernaculars and regional Italian, especially Sicilian.

=== Historical realism ===
Historical realism is a writing style or sub-genre of realistic fiction centered around historical events and time periods. In historical realism, the structure and context of a text is usually solely derived from a real historical event or time period. As a consequence of this, many texts that fall under this category are philosophical by nature.

== Realism in the novel ==
=== Australia ===
In the early nineteenth century, there was growing impetus to establish an Australian culture that was separate from its English Colonial beginnings. Common artistic motifs and characters that were represented in Australian realism were the Australian Outback, known simply as "the bush", in its harsh and volatile beauty, the British settlers, the Indigenous Australian, the squatter and the digger—although some of these bordered into a more mythic territory in much of Australia's art scene. A significant portion of Australia's early realism was a rejection of, according to what the Sydney Bulletin called in 1881 a "romantic identity" of the country.

Most of the earliest writing in the colony was not literature in the most recent international sense, but rather journals and documentations of expeditions and environments, although literary style and preconceptions entered into the journal writing. Oftentimes in early Australian literature, romanticism and realism co-existed, as exemplified by Joseph Furphy's Such Is Life (1897)–a fictional account of the life of rural dwellers, including bullock drivers, squatters and itinerant travellers, in southern New South Wales and Victoria, during the 1880s. Catherine Helen Spence's Clara Morison (1854), which detailed a Scottish woman's immigration to Adelaide, South Australia, in a time when many people were leaving the freely settled state of South Australia to claim fortunes in the gold rushes of Victoria and New South Wales.

The burgeoning literary concept that Australia was an extension of another, more distant country, was beginning to infiltrate into writing: "[those] who have at last understood the significance of Australian history as a transplanting of stocks and the sending down of roots in a new soil". Henry Handel Richardson, author of post-Federation novels such as Maurice Guest (1908) and The Getting of Wisdom (1910), was said to have been heavily influenced by French and Scandinavian realism. In the twentieth century, as the working-class community of Sydney proliferated, the focus was shifted from the bush archetype to a more urban, inner-city setting: William Lane's The Working Man's Paradise (1892), Christina Stead's Seven Poor Men of Sydney (1934) and Ruth Park's The Harp in the South (1948) all depicted the harsh, gritty reality of working class Sydney. Patrick White's novels Tree of Man (1955) and Voss (1957) fared particularly well and in 1973 White was awarded the Nobel Prize in Literature.

A new kind of literary realism emerged in the late twentieth century, helmed by Helen Garner's Monkey Grip (1977) which revolutionised contemporary fiction in Australia, though it has since emerged that the novel was diaristic and based on Garner's own experiences. Monkey Grip concerns itself with a single-mother living in a succession of Melbourne share-houses, as she navigates her increasingly obsessive relationship with a drug addict who drifts in and out of her life. A sub-set of realism emerged in Australia's literary scene known as "dirty realism", typically written by "new, young authors" who examined "gritty, dirty, real existences", of lower-income young people, whose lives revolve around a nihilistic pursuit of casual sex, recreational drug use and alcohol, which are used to escape boredom. Examples of dirty-realism include Andrew McGahan's Praise (1992), Christos Tsiolkas's Loaded (1995), Justine Ettler's The River Ophelia (1995) and Brendan Cowell's How It Feels (2010), although many of these, including their predecessor Monkey Grip, are now labelled with a genre coined in 1995 as "grunge lit".

=== United Kingdom ===
Ian Watt in The Rise of the Novel (1957) saw the novel as originating in the early 18th-century and he argued that the novel's 'novelty' was its 'formal realism': the idea 'that the novel is a full and authentic report of human experience'. His examples are novelists Daniel Defoe, Samuel Richardson and Henry Fielding. Watt argued that the novel's concern with realistically described relations between ordinary individuals, ran parallel to the more general development of philosophical realism, middle-class economic individualism and Puritan individualism. He also claims that the form addressed the interests and capacities of the new middle-class reading public and the new book trade evolving in response to them. As tradesmen themselves, Defoe and Richardson had only to 'consult their own standards' to know that their work would appeal to a large audience.

Later in the 19th century George Eliot's (1819–1880) Middlemarch: A Study of Provincial Life (1871–72), described by novelists Martin Amis and Julian Barnes as the greatest novel in the English language, is a work of realism. Through the voices and opinions of different characters the reader becomes aware of important issues of the day, including the Reform Bill of 1832, the beginnings of the railways, and the state of contemporary medical science. Middlemarch also shows the deeply reactionary mindset within a settled community facing the prospect of what to many is unwelcome social, political and technological change.

While George Gissing (1857–1903), author of New Grub Street (1891), amongst many other works, has traditionally been viewed as a naturalist, mainly influenced by Émile Zola, Jacob Korg has suggested that George Eliot was a greater influence.

Other novelists, such as Arnold Bennett (1867–1931) and Anglo-Irishman George Moore (1852–1933), consciously imitated the French realists. Bennett's most famous works are the Clayhanger trilogy (1910–18) and The Old Wives' Tale (1908). These books draw on his experience of life in the Staffordshire Potteries, an industrial area encompassing the six towns that now make up Stoke-on-Trent in Staffordshire, England. George Moore, whose most famous work is Esther Waters (1894), was also influenced by the naturalism of Zola.

=== United States ===
William Dean Howells (1837–1920) was the first American author to bring a realist aesthetic to the literature of the United States. His stories of middle and upper class life set in the 1880s and 1890s are highly regarded among scholars of American fiction. His most popular novel, The Rise of Silas Lapham (1885), depicts a man who, ironically, falls from materialistic fortune by his own mistakes.

One of the earliest examples of realism was Josiah Gilbert Holland’s second novel, Miss Gilbert’s Career, published “a full decade before any of the so-called pioneer American realistic novelists begin to publish.“ The 1860 novel “anticipated these much abler and more penetrating realists.“ This includes Samuel Clemens (1835–1910), better known by his pen name of Mark Twain, author of Adventures of Huckleberry Finn (1884), and Stephen Crane (1871–1900).

Twain's style, based on vigorous, realistic, colloquial American speech, gave American writers a new appreciation of their national voice. Twain was the first major author to come from the interior of the country, and he captured its distinctive, humorous slang and iconoclasm. For Twain and other American writers of the late 19th century, realism was not merely a literary technique: It was a way of speaking truth and exploding worn-out conventions. Crane was primarily a journalist who also wrote fiction, essays, poetry, and plays. Crane saw life at its rawest, in slums and on battlefields. His haunting Civil War novel, The Red Badge of Courage, was published to great acclaim in 1895, but he barely had time to bask in the attention before he died, at 28, having neglected his health. He has enjoyed continued success ever since—as a champion of the common man, a realist, and a symbolist. Crane's Maggie: A Girl of the Streets (1893), is one of the best, if not the earliest, naturalistic American novel. It is the harrowing story of a poor, sensitive young girl whose uneducated, alcoholic parents utterly fail her. In love, and eager to escape her violent home life, she allows herself to be seduced into living with a young man, who soon deserts her. When her self-righteous mother rejects her, Maggie becomes a prostitute to survive but soon dies. Crane's earthy subject matter and his objective, scientific style, devoid of moralizing, earmark Maggie as a naturalist work.

Other later American realists are John Steinbeck, Frank Norris, Theodore Dreiser, Upton Sinclair, Jack London, Edith Wharton and Henry James.

=== Europe ===
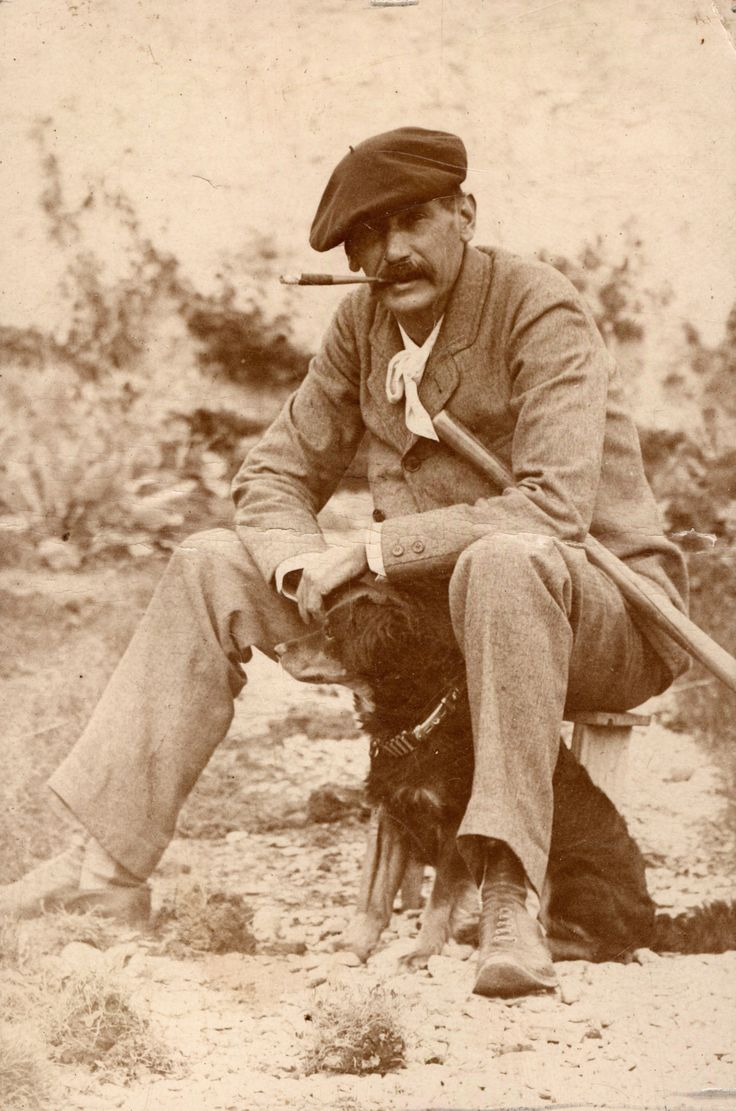
Benito Pérez Galdós, Spanish writer from the Canary Islands

Honoré de Balzac (1799–1850) is the most prominent representative of 19th-century realism in fiction through the inclusion of specific detail and recurring characters. His La Comédie humaine, a vast collection of nearly 100 novels, was the most ambitious scheme ever devised by a writer of fiction—nothing less than a complete contemporary history of his countrymen. Realism is also an important aspect of the works of Alexandre Dumas, fils (1824–1895).

Many of the novels in this period, including Balzac's, were published in newspapers in serial form, and the immensely popular realist "roman feuilleton" tended to specialize in portraying the hidden side of urban life (crime, police spies, criminal slang), as in the novels of Eugène Sue. Similar tendencies appeared in the theatrical melodramas of the period and, in an even more lurid and gruesome light, in the Grand Guignol at the end of the century. Aleksis Kivi (1834–1872), known today as the "national author of Finland", wrote his only novel The Seven Brothers (1870), which was strongly influenced by Cervantes, and which received at time a very negative reception from critics because its contemporary descriptions of the life of a Finnish peasants in an unadorned realism, long before the work achieved the status of a national novel.

Gustave Flaubert's (1821–1880) acclaimed novels Madame Bovary (1857), which reveals the tragic consequences of romanticism on the wife of a provincial doctor, and Sentimental Education (1869) represent perhaps the highest stages in the development of French realism. Flaubert also wrote other works in an entirely different style and his romanticism is apparent in the fantastic The Temptation of Saint Anthony (final version published 1874) and the baroque and exotic scenes of ancient Carthage in Salammbô (1862).

In German literature, 19th-century realism developed under the name of "Poetic Realism" or "Bourgeois Realism," and major figures include Theodor Fontane, Gustav Freytag, Gottfried Keller, Wilhelm Raabe, Adalbert Stifter, and Theodor Storm.

In Italian literature, the realism genre developed a detached description of the social and economic conditions of people in their time and environment. Major figures of Italian Verismo include Luigi Capuana, Giovanni Verga, Federico De Roberto, Matilde Serao, Salvatore Di Giacomo, and Grazia Deledda, who in 1926 received the Nobel Prize for Literature.

Later realist writers included Fyodor Dostoevsky, Leo Tolstoy, Benito Pérez Galdós, Guy de Maupassant, Anton Chekhov, Leopoldo Alas (Clarín), Machado de Assis, Eça de Queiroz, Henryk Sienkiewicz, Bolesław Prus and, in a sense, Émile Zola, whose naturalism is often regarded as an offshoot of realism.

== Realism in the theatre ==
Theatrical realism was a general movement in 19th-century theatre from the time period of 1870–1960 that developed a set of dramatic and theatrical conventions with the aim of bringing a greater fidelity of real life to texts and performances. Part of a broader artistic movement, it shared many stylistic choices with naturalism, including a focus on everyday (middle-class) drama, ordinary speech, and dull settings. Realism and naturalism diverge chiefly on the degree of choice that characters have: while naturalism believes in the overall strength of external forces over internal decisions, realism asserts the power of the individual to choose (see A Doll's House).

Russia's first professional playwright, Aleksey Pisemsky, along with novelists Fyodor Dostoevsky and Leo Tolstoy (The Power of Darkness (1886)), began a tradition of psychological realism in Russia which culminated with the establishment of the Moscow Art Theatre by Constantin Stanislavski and Vladimir Nemirovich-Danchenko. Their ground-breaking productions of the plays of Anton Chekhov in turn influenced Maxim Gorky and Mikhail Bulgakov. Stanislavski went on to develop his 'system', a form of actor training that is particularly suited to psychological realism.

19th-century realism is closely connected to the development of modern drama, which, as Martin Harrison explains, "is usually said to have begun in the early 1870s" with the "middle-period" work of the Norwegian dramatist Henrik Ibsen. Ibsen's realistic drama in prose has been "enormously influential."

In opera, verismo refers to a post-Romantic Italian tradition that sought to incorporate the naturalism of Émile Zola and Henrik Ibsen. It included realistic – sometimes sordid or violent – depictions of contemporary everyday life, especially the life of the lower classes.

In France in addition to melodramas, popular and bourgeois theater in the mid-century turned to realism in the "well-made" bourgeois farces of Eugène Marin Labiche and the moral dramas of Émile Augier.

== Criticism ==
Critics of realism cite that depicting reality is not often realistic, with some observers calling it "imaginary" or "project[ed]". This argument is based on the idea that we do not often understand what is real correctly. To present reality, we draw on what is "real" according to how we remember it as well as how we experience it. However, remembered or experienced reality does not always correspond to what the truth is. Instead, we often obtain a distorted version of it that is only related to what is out there or how things really are. Realism is criticized for its supposed inability to address this challenge and such failure is seen as tantamount to complicity in a creating a process wherein "the artefactual nature of reality is overlooked or even concealed." According to Catherine Gallagher, realistic fiction invariably undermines, in practice, the ideology it purports to exemplify because if appearances were self-sufficient, there would probably be no need for novels. This can be demonstrated in literary naturalism's focus in the United States during the late nineteenth century on the larger forces that determine the lives of its characters, as depicted in agricultural machines portrayed as immense and terrible, shredding "entangled" human bodies without compunction. The machines were used as a metaphor, but the metaphor contributed to the perception that such narratives were more like myth than reality.

There are also critics who fault realism in the way it supposedly defines itself as a reaction to the excesses of literary genres such as Romanticism and the Gothic – those that focus on the exotic, sentimental, and sensational narratives. Some scholars began to call this an impulse to contradict so that in the end, the limit that it imposes on itself leads to "either the representation of verifiable and objective truth or the merely relative, some partial, subjective truth, therefore no truth at all."

There are also critics who cite the absence of a fixed definition. The argument is that there is no pure form of realism and the position that it is almost impossible to find literature that is not in fact realist, at least to some extent while, and that whenever one searches for pure realism, it vanishes. J.P. Stern countered this position when he maintained that this "looseness" or "untidiness" makes the term indispensable in common and literary discourse alike. Others also dismiss it as obvious and simple-minded while denying realistic aesthetic, branding as pretentious since it is considered mere reportage, not art, and based on naïve metaphysics.

== See also ==
- Chanson réaliste (realist song), a style of music which was directly influenced by realist literary movement in France
- Magical realism, a genre of fiction and art that depicts magical elements within a realist presentation
- Verismo, an application of the tenets of realism to (especially late-romantic Italian) opera
