= Fennimore and Gerda =

1919 German opera by Frederick Delius

Fennimore und Gerda
- Opera by Frederick Delius
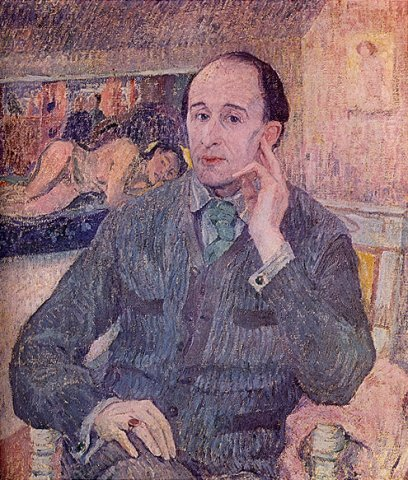
- Librettist: Frederick Delius
- Language: German
- Based on: Niels Lyhne by Jens Peter Jacobsen
- Premiere: 21 October 1919; Oper Frankfurt

Fennimore und Gerda (subtitled Two Episodes from the Life of Niels Lyhne in Eleven Pictures, RT I/8) is a German-language opera with four interludes, by the English composer Frederick Delius. It is usually performed and recorded in English, as Fennimore and Gerda in a translation by Philip Heseltine. The German libretto, by the composer himself, is based on the novel Niels Lyhne by the Danish writer Jens Peter Jacobsen. In neither German nor English is the libretto highly regarded; rather, the work is considered an "orchestral opera", limited in its dramatic appeal but voluptuous and engaging in its instrumental texture.

Delius began writing Fennimore und Gerda in 1908; he finished in 1910, but the premiere, intended for the Cologne Opera, was delayed by the First World War and did not take place until 21 October 1919, and then by the Oper Frankfurt. It was the composer's last opera. The United States premiere of the work was staged by the Opera Theatre of Saint Louis in June 1981 with Kathryn Bouleyn as Fennimore and Kathryn Gamberoni as Gerda.

== Roles ==
Roles, voice types, premiere cast
Role	Voice type	Premiere cast, 21 October 1919 Conductor: Gustav Brecher
Consul Claudi	bass	Walter Schneider
The Consul's wife	mezzo-soprano	
Fennimore, their daughter	mezzo-soprano	Emma Holt
Niels Lyhne, Claudi's nephew	baritone	Robert von Scheidt
Erik Refstrup, Niels's cousin	tenor	Erik Wirl
A Squire	baritone	
A Tax Collector	baritone	
A Tutor	tenor	
A Brandy Distiller	baritone	
A Doctor	tenor	
Councillor Skinnerup	bass	
Gerda, his daughter	soprano	Elisabeth Kandt
Ingrid, his daughter	soprano	
Lila, his daughter	soprano	
Marit, his daughter	soprano	
Maidservants, girls and farmhands

== Synopsis ==
Place: Denmark
Time: Around 1860

Two cousins, the writer Niels Lyhne and the painter Erik Refstrup, are in love with the consul's daughter, Fennimore. She chooses Erik but the marriage begins to break down as a result of the artist's drinking and Fennimore embarks on an affair with Niels. Erik is killed in an accident and, overwhelmed with guilt, Fennimore breaks off the affair. The rejected Niels spends years travelling before he settles down and marries his neighbour's daughter, Gerda.

== Recordings ==
- Fennimore and Gerda – Elisabeth Söderström, Brian Rayner Cook, Robert Tear, Birger Brandt, Danish National Radio Choir and Symphony Orchestra, conducted by Meredith Davies (HMV, 1976; reissued on EMI CD, 1997)
- Fennimore and Gerda – Randi Stene, Judith Howarth, Mark Tucker, Peter Coleman-Wright, Danish National Radio Choir and Symphony Orchestra, conducted by Richard Hickox (Chandos, 1999)
