= Maurice Guest =

Maurice Guest may refer to:

- Morris Gest (1875–1942), also Maurice Guest, American theatrical producer
- Maurice Guest (novel), a novel by Henry Handel Richardson
