= The Young Cosima =

1939 novel by Henry Handel Richardson

- First US edition
- Author: Henry Handel Richardson
- Language: English
- Publisher: Heinemann, London; W. W. Norton, New York
- Publication date: 1939
- Media type: Print (hardback & paperback)
- Pages: 340 pp
- Preceded by: Ultima Thule

The Young Cosima (1939) is the last novel by Australian writer Henry Handel Richardson.

== Plot summary ==
Set around 1850, the novel follows the composer Richard Wagner as he fights for recognition and details his relationships with Franz Liszt, Hans von Buelow and his wife Cosima von Buelow (who later married Wagner).

== Reviews ==
A reviewer in The Argus was very impressed with the book: "Great novelist that she is Henry Handel Richardson has now written an historical romance which should make her name better known among the rank and file of readers Her famous Australian trilogy, The Fortunes of Richard Mahony swept her into the front rank of contemporary writers, but its appeal was not to the majority...The Young Cosima is a capital novel. With its magnificent portraits of nineteenth century personages, its dramatic accounts of the making of mighty music, its subtleties, its humour, and its tragedy, it carries the reader through some of the most stirring periods in the careers of its principals Miss Richardson has taken infinite pains to ensure the fidelity of her portraits"

In a short review in The Sydney Morning Herald the reviewer points to the craft behind the work: "Gleaning facts from a number of sources, listed at the back of the book, Miss Richardson has built up a vivid and moving romantic novel. The period, circa 1850, so close to our own in time, is far enough removed in outlook and habit of thought to appear remote. This factor, though not stressed, is subtly used in order to present the characters as something more than life size. An unusual and often subtle interpretation of some of the facts lends freshness and emphasis to incidents and situations which have already become more or less historically stereotyped. The dialogue has, except in moments of passion and excitement, that slight stiffness appropriate to the nineteenth century."

== See also ==
- 1939 in Australian literature
