= Henry Handel Richardson =

Australian author (1870–1946)

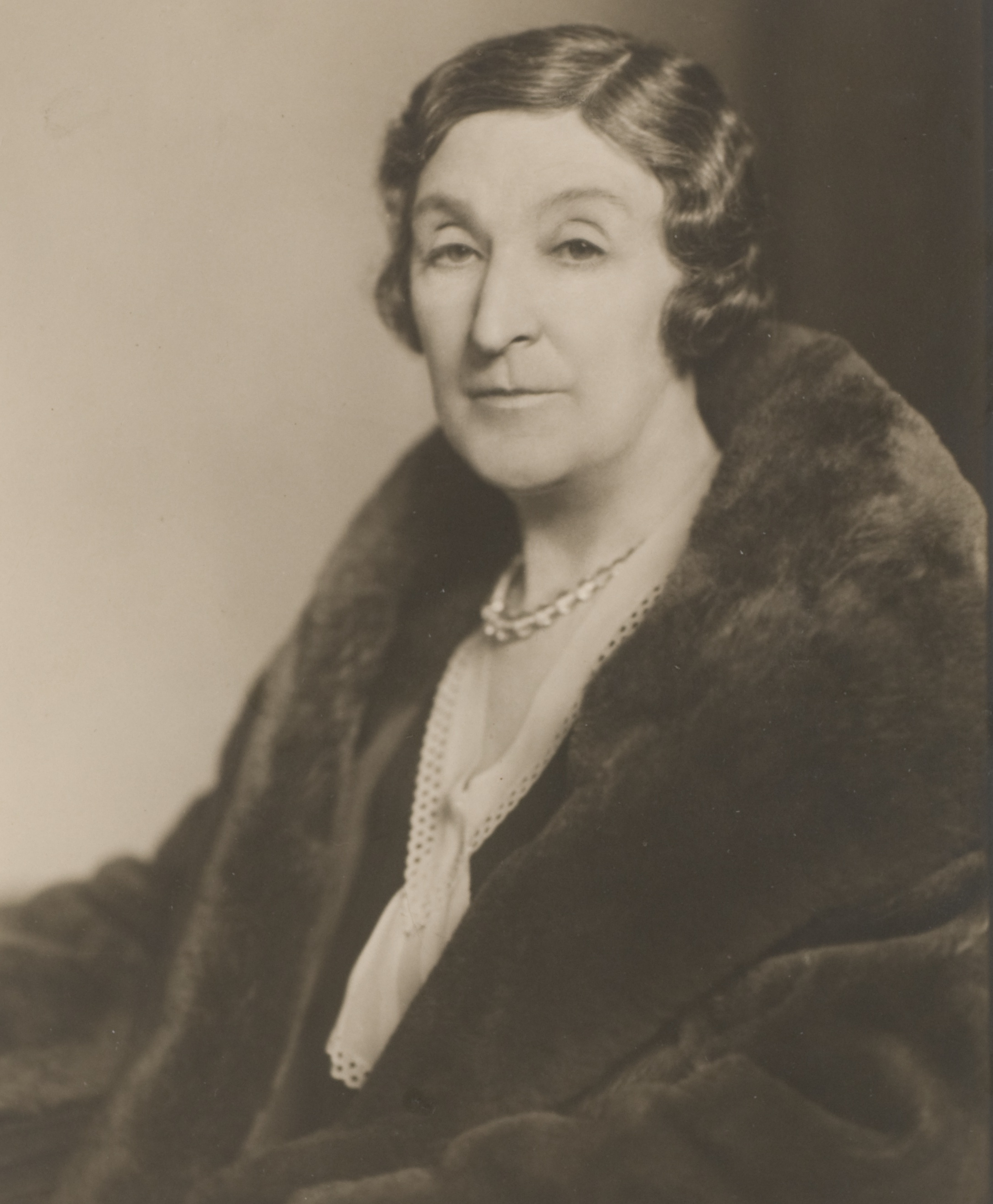
- Ethel Richardson (Henry Handel Richardson), ca. 1935
- Born: Ethel Florence Lindesay Richardson; 3 January 1870; 179 Victoria Parade, Fitzroy, Victoria, Australia
- Died: 20 March 1946 (aged 76); Hastings, East Sussex, England
- Writing career
- Language: English
- Years active: 1895–1940
- Notable work: The Fortunes of Richard Mahony, The Getting of Wisdom

Ethel Florence Lindesay Richardson (3 January 1870 – 20 March 1946), known by her pen name Henry Handel Richardson, was an Australian author.

== Life ==
Born in East Melbourne, Victoria, Australia, into a prosperous family that later fell on hard times, Ethel Florence (who preferred to answer to Et, Ettie or Etta) was the elder daughter of Walter Lindesay Richardson MD (c. 1826–1879) and his wife Mary (née Bailey).

The family lived in various towns across Victoria during Richardson's childhood and youth. These included Chiltern, Queenscliff, Koroit and Maldon, where Richardson's mother was postmistress (her father having died when she was nine of syphilis). The Richardsons' home in Chiltern, "Lake View", is now owned by the National Trust and open to visitors.

Richardson left Maldon to become a boarder at Presbyterian Ladies' College (PLC) in Melbourne in 1883 and attended from the ages of 13 to 17. This experience was the basis for The Getting of Wisdom, a coming-of-age novel admired by H. G. Wells. At PLC she started to develop her ability to credibly mix fact with fiction, a skill she used to advantage in her novels.

Richardson excelled in the arts and music during her time at PLC, and her mother took the family to Europe in 1888, to enable Richardson to continue her musical studies at the Leipzig Conservatorium. Richardson set her first novel, Maurice Guest, in Leipzig.

In 1894 in Munich Richardson married the Scot John George Robertson, whom she had met in Leipzig where he was studying German literature and who later briefly taught at the University of Strasburg, where his wife became ladies' tennis champion. In 1903, the couple moved to London, where Robertson had been appointed to the first chair of German at University College, London. Richardson returned to Australia in 1912, in order to research family history for The Fortunes of Richard Mahony, but after her return to England, she remained there for the rest of her life. She and her sister Lillian were ardent supporters of the suffragette movement, Lillian even being imprisoned for destroying public property. She was involved in psychic research, and after her husband's death, she claimed she maintained daily contact with him via seances.

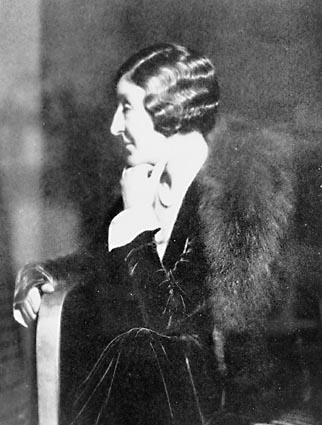
HHRichardson

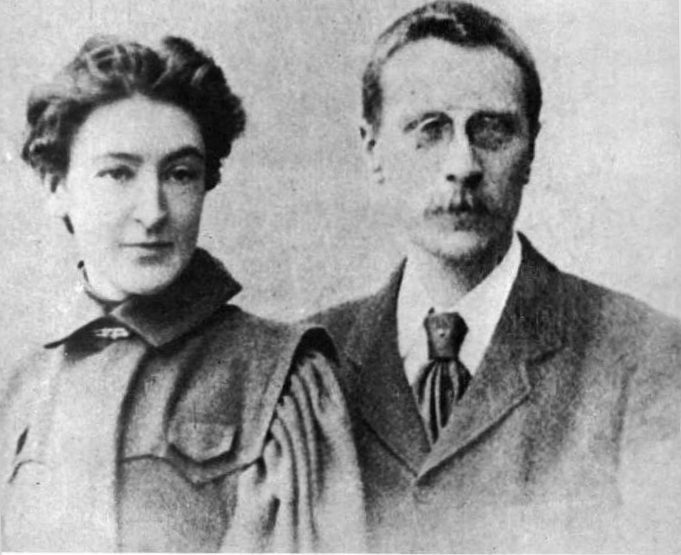
Richardson with husband J.G. Robertson 1896

Florence Emily Green paid for part of the education of Richardson. In her coming of age novel The Getting of Wisdom, Florence and her brother were depicted as Miss Isabella and the Rev Mr Shepherd. Her accurate description of Florence is said to be "malicious". Her younger brother was educated at Trinity College, Melbourne. Richardson experienced lesbian desire throughout her life. At the Presbyterian Ladies' College, she fell in love with an older schoolgirl; the feelings of adolescent females awakening to their sexuality were reflected in The Getting of Wisdom. After her mother's death, she fell passionately in love with the Italian actress Eleonora Duse, but had to be content to love her from a distance. Her friend Olga Roncoroni, who had lived in the Robertson household for many years, filled the gap left by the death of her husband. After her own death, many of her private papers were destroyed, in accordance with her instructions.

The Fortunes of Richard Mahony is Richardson's famous trilogy about the slow decline, owing to character flaws and an unnamed brain disease, of a successful Australian physician and businessman and the emotional/financial effect on his family. It was highly praised by Sinclair Lewis, among others, and was inspired by Richardson's own family experiences. The central characters were based loosely on her own parents. Richardson also produced a single volume of short stories and an autobiography that greatly illuminates the settings of her novels, although her Australian Dictionary of Biography entry doubts that it is reliable.

Manning Clark noted Richardson's excitement at Don Bradman's cricketing prowess in 1930: "She talked with pride about the achievements of Bradman ... and was so excited by the performance of the boy from Bowral she scarcely talked on anything else when Vance Palmer called on her."

Richardson was godmother to Humphrey, son of the singer Sophie Wyss. His godfather was Benjamin Britten.

Richardson died of cancer on 20 March 1946 in Hastings, East Sussex, England. Her cremated remains were scattered by her wish with her husband's at sea.

Iris Murdoch is her second cousin twice removed.

== Family ==
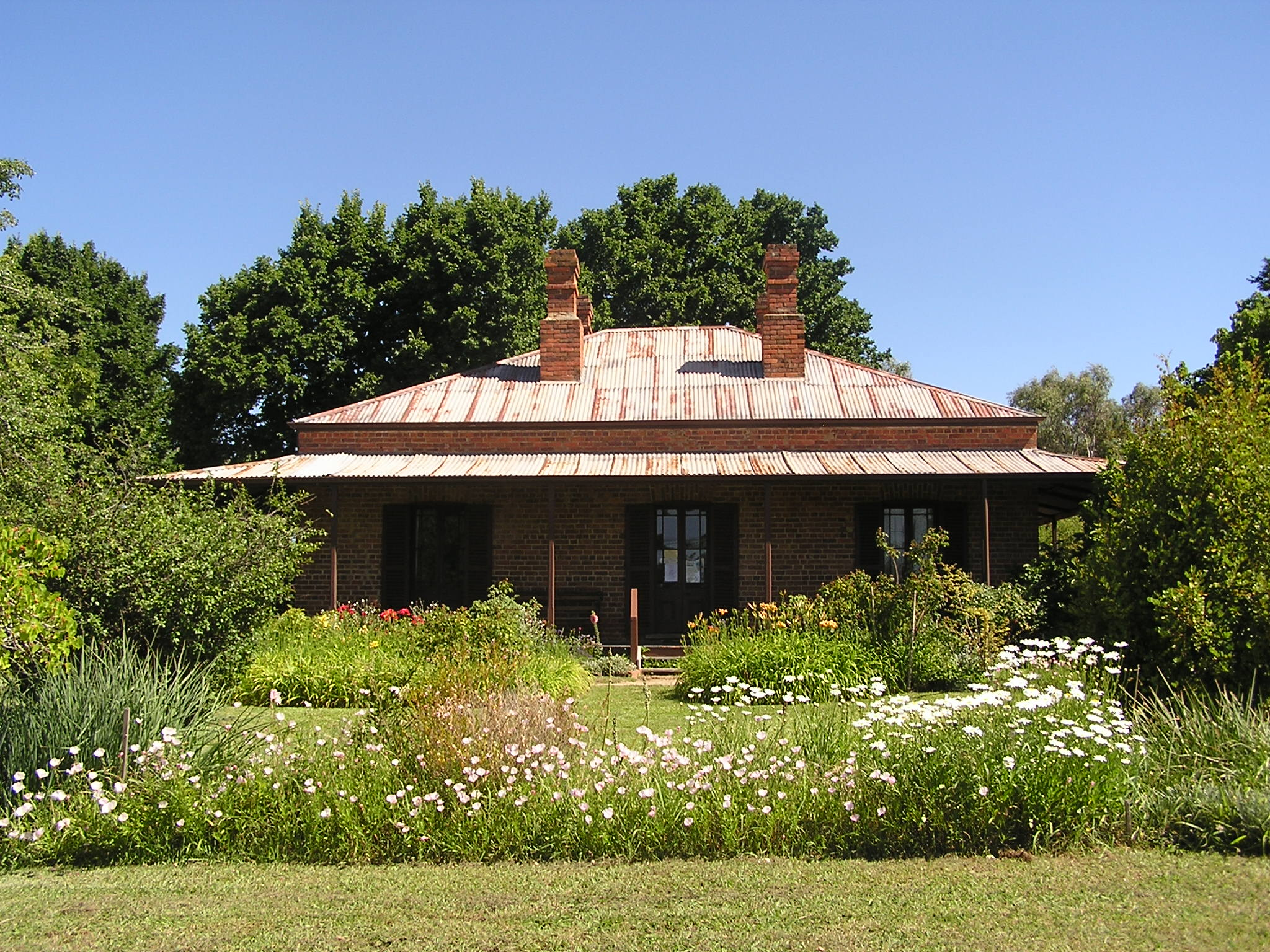
Lake View House at Chiltern, Victoria, her home from July 1876 for 18 months. Her early years at Chiltern featured in the novel The Fortunes of Richard Mahony. The house was accepted by the National Trust of Australia in 1967.

Lillian Richardson, Ethel's younger sister, married A. S. Neill after divorcing her first husband, and helped found and run Summerhill School.

Her uncle was the Irish naturalist and writer Henry Downing Richardson.

== Honours ==
The Canberra suburb of Richardson was gazetted in 1975 and is named after Henry Handel Richardson. In the same year, she was honoured on a postage stamp bearing her portrait issued by Australia Post.

One of the houses at Abbotsleigh School for Girls in Wahroonga, Sydney is named after Richardson.

Richardson Hall, one of the residential halls at Monash University's Clayton campus, is named after Richardson.

Richardson was posthumously inducted onto the Victorian Honour Roll of Women in 2001.

=== Nobel Prize in Literature ===
In 1939, Richardson was nominated by Sten Bodvar Liljegren, a Swedish professor of English language and a member of the Royal Society of Letters at Lund. With her nomination, she became the first Australian female author nominated for such an honor.

During the deliberations, the Nobel Committee expressed great "respect and admiration for her intelligence and her soul knowledge of rare genuineness, but due to some aesthetic concerns, [her] proposal was not recommended."

== List of works ==
=== Novels ===
- Maurice Guest (1908)
- The Getting of Wisdom (1910)
- Australia Felix (1917)
- The Way Home (1925)
- Ultima Thule (1929) (Awarded the Australian Literature Society Gold Medal for 1929.)
- The Fortunes of Richard Mahony (1930)
  - Comprising the novels: Australia Felix, The Way Home and Ultima Thule
- The Young Cosima (1939)

=== Short story collections ===
- Two Studies (1931) (Mary Christina, Life and Death of Peterle Luthe).
- The End of a Childhood and other short stories (1934). 15 short stories, comprising also the stories in "Two Studies".
- The Adventures of Cuffy Mahony (1979)
- The End of a Childhood: The Complete Stories of Henry Handel Richardson (1992), edited by Carol

=== Memoir ===
- Myself When Young (1948)

=== Translations ===
- (As Robertson, Ethel F. L.) Siren Voices (1896). From the Norwegian Niels Lyhne by Jens Peter Jacobsen.
- (Not Credited) Siren Voices (1896). From the Norwegian Niels Lyhne by Jens Peter Jacobsen.

== Film ==
The Getting of Wisdom was filmed in 1977, directed by Bruce Beresford, from a screenplay by Eleanor Witcombe, starring Susannah Fowle as "Laura Rambotham" with supporting roles by Julia Blake, Terence Donovan and Kerry Armstrong. The screenplay adheres closely to the novel.

Maurice Guest was adapted, very loosely, for the screen in Rhapsody (1954) starring Elizabeth Taylor, with the setting in Switzerland rather than Germany. It ended with "James Guest" (John Ericson) happily married, rather than committing suicide.
