= Mathilde Mann =

German translator and editor

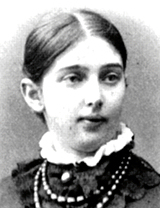
- Born: Mathilde Charlotte Bertha Friederike Scheven; 24 February 1859; Rostock, Grand Duchy of Mecklenburg-Schwerin
- Died: 14 February 1925 (aged 65); Rostock, Germany
- Occupations: Translator, Editor, Author
- Spouse: Johann Bernhard Mann (m. 1878; div. 1892)
- Father: Ernst Scheven
- Honours: Honorary Doctorate from University of Rostock

Mathilde Mann (née 'Mathilde Charlotte Bertha Friederike Scheven') was a prominent German translator and editor, especially for Nordic languages.

== Life ==
Mann was born on 24 February 1859 in Rostock. She was the daughter of the physician Ernst Heinrich Carl Scheven. With the support of her family, she learned French, English, Italian, Danish, Swedish, and Norwegian. In 1878 she married Johann Bernhard Mann, the son of Royal Danish Consul Friedrich Johann Bernhard Mann (1853–1910). After her husband's grain trade went bankrupt in 1885, she saved him from prison by utilizing a petition. In the same year, the couple settled in Copenhagen, Denmark. There she began to offer her services as a translator.

With the steadily increasing emancipation and economic independence from her husband, the couple split up in 1892. In 1893 she was sworn in as a translator for Nordic languages by the Rostocker Gewett (Senate) and lived in Warnemünde. In 1895 she moved to Altona, and in 1906 to Hamburg. During this time she mainly worked as a translator and translated works by Henrik Ibsen and Hans Christian Andersen into German. The Danish King awarded her the Golden Medal for Art and Science in 1910 for her services to Danish literature. In 1911 she went back to Denmark.

From 1921, she worked as a lecturer for the Danish language for the University of Rostock. The official establishment of a lecturer's office failed because the responsible ministry did not provide the necessary funds. In 1924, the university honored her as the first woman without an academic career with an honorary doctorate. Mann died in Rostock on 14 February 1925.

== Translations ==
Mann translated more than 300 books from at least four languages.

- The Story of Gösta Berling by Selma Lagerlöf
- Darstellung des Menschen in der Älteren Griechischen Kunst by Jul Lange
- Strix: die Geschichte eines Uhus by Svend Fleuron
- "Antarctic": zwei Jahre in Schnee und Eis am Südpol by Otto Nordenskjöld
- The Philosopher's Stone by J. Anker Larsen
- Arne by Bjørnstjerne Bjørnson
- Aus jungen Tagen: Blätter aus einer Dornenkrone by Henrik Pontoppidan
- Jens Peter Jacobsens sämtliche Werke by Jens Peter Jacobsen
- Das buch des Lappen Johan Turi, erzählung von dem leben der Lappen by Johan Olafsson Turi
- Mogens: eine Novelle by Jens Peter Jacobsen
