= Letters to a Young Poet =

Collection of letters by Rainer Maria Rilke

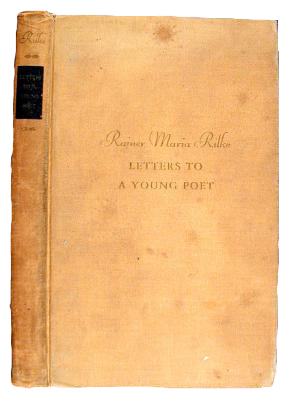
- Cover of the 1934 edition
- Author: Rainer Maria Rilke
- Translator: Charlie Louth
- Language: German
- Genre: Non-fiction Letter collection
- Publisher: Insel Verlag
- Publication date: 1929
- Pages: 48 (Penguin Classics)

Letters to a Young Poet (original title, in German: Briefe an einen jungen Dichter) is a collection of ten letters written by the Bohemian-Austrian poet Rainer Maria Rilke (1875–1926) to Franz Xaver Kappus (1883–1966), a 19-year-old officer cadet at the Theresian Military Academy in Wiener Neustadt, between 1903 and 1908. Rilke, the son of an Austrian army officer, had studied at the academy's lower school at Sankt Pölten in the 1890s. Kappus corresponded with the popular poet and author from 1902 to 1908 seeking his advice as to the quality of his poetry, and in deciding between a literary career or a career as an officer in the Austro-Hungarian Army. Kappus compiled and published the letters in 1929—three years after Rilke's death from leukemia.

In the first letter, Rilke respectfully declines to review or criticize Kappus' poetry, advising the younger Kappus that "Nobody can advise you and help you, nobody. There is only one way. Go into yourself." Rilke, over the course of the ten letters, proceeds to advise Kappus on how a poet should feel, love, and seek truth in trying to understand and experience the world around him and engage the world of art. These letters offer insight into the ideas and themes that appear in Rilke's poetry and his working process. Further, these letters were written during a key period of Rilke's early artistic development after his reputation as a poet began to be established with the publication of parts of Das Stunden-Buch (The Book of Hours) and Das Buch der Bilder (The Book of Images).

== Writing and publication ==
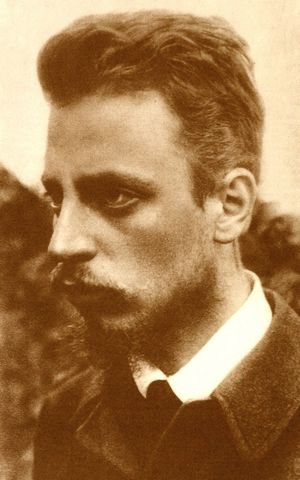
The author of the letters: Rainer Maria Rilke

=== Correspondence with Rilke ===
In 1929, Franz Xaver Kappus compiled ten letters that he had received from Rainer Maria Rilke that were written from 1902 to 1908 and published them under the title Briefe an einen jungen Dichter (Letters to a Young Poet) through Insel Verlag in Leipzig. Later information revealed that Rilke and Kappus did meet in person.

In an introduction to the collection, Kappus recounts how he came to write to Rainer Maria Rilke. According to Kappus, in late 1902 while a student at the Theresian Military Academy in Wiener Neustadt in Lower Austria, he was reading Rilke's poetry. He was approached by the academy's chaplain, Horacek, who noted that Rilke had been a pupil years earlier at the academy's lower school at Sankt Pölten. Horacek expressed surprise that the former pupil had "become a poet" and described to Kappus the young Rilke as a "thin, pale boy" whose quiet demeanor proved unable to bear the strain of a military education and life. Rilke did not continue his military education. At the time that Kappus learned this he was inclined toward writing and was not very keen on the notion of dedicating his life to the military. Kappus then decided to write to Rilke for advice.

When Kappus wrote his first letter to Rilke he asked for Rilke to provide a critique of his poetry. Rilke provided the young Kappus very little in criticism or in suggestions for his improvement as a poet. Instead, Rilke discouraged Kappus from reading criticism and advised him to trust his inner judgment, commenting that "Nobody can advise you and help you. Nobody. There is only one way—Go into yourself." Rilke provided advice that inspired Kappus to search broader issues of intimacy and the nature of beauty and art, as well as probing philosophical and existential questions. The letters address personal issues that Kappus had apparently revealed to Rilke; ranging from atheism, loneliness, and career choices.

The originally published collection does not include Kappus's letters to Rilke, though the original German collection does include one sonnet of Kappus's own that Rilke sent back to him in Rilke's handwriting with the instruction to "Read the lines as if they were unknown to you, and you will feel in your inmost self how very much they are yours." However, in 2017, the letters from Kappus to Rilke were found in the Rilke family archive. Kappus's letters were published in German in 2019, and an English translation was published in 2020.

=== Rilke's influence on Kappus ===
Aside from his role in writing to Rilke and later publishing these letters, Franz Xaver Kappus (1883–1966) is largely forgotten by history. Kappus was descended from a Banat Swabian (ethnic German) family born in Timișoara, in the Banat region, now divided between Hungary, Serbia and Romania. Despite the hesitancy he expressed in his letters to Rilke about pursuing a military career, he continued his military studies and served for 15 years as an officer in the Austro-Hungarian Army. During the course of his life, he worked as a newspaper editor and journalist, writing poems, humorous sketches, short-stories, novels, and adapted several works (including his own) into screenplays for films in the 1930s. However, Kappus did not achieve lasting fame.

== The Letters ==
=== The first letter ===
Written in Paris, France on 17 February 1903 – Rilke writes that criticism fails to "touch a work of art." He urges the reader to eschew others' opinions of his poetry. Instead, the young poet should look inward and examine what truly motivates him to continue writing. Rilke expands on the theme of developing a rich inner life and offers an inspiring perspective on the process of creating art.

=== The second letter ===
Written in Viareggio, near Pisa, Italy on 5 April 1903 – Rilke describes two focuses for his second letter: the first is irony, which he urges the young poet to be wary of, and in the second section, he recommends the books that "are indispensable to [him]," specifically "the Bible and the books of the great Danish writer, Jens Peter Jacobsen."

=== The third letter ===
Written in Viareggio, near Pisa, Italy on 23 April 1903 – Rilke discusses Niels Lyhne and Marie Grubbe by Jens Peter Jacobsen in relation to the nature of art.

"In this there is no measuring with time. A year doesn’t matter; ten years are nothing. To be an artist means not to compute or count; it means to ripen as the tree, which does not force its sap, but stands unshaken in the storms of spring with no fear that summer might not follow. It will come regardless. But it comes only to those who live as though eternity stretches before them, carefree, silent, and endless. I learn it daily, learn it with many pains, for which I am grateful: Patience is all!"

In the second section of the letter, Rilke critiques the work of Richard Dehmel: "For him there exists no totally mature and pure world of sex, none that is simply human and not masculine only." Rilke argues that rooting art that deals with love in gender "disfigure[s]" it, and that "there is in [Dehmel's] perception something spiteful, seemingly wild, something temporal, not eternal. There is something that detracts from his art, and makes it suggestive and questionable."

Yet despite this criticism, Rilke argues that there are elements to be appreciated in Dehmel's work.

Rilke concludes the third letter lamenting that he is too poor to send the young poet copies of his own books.

=== The fourth letter ===
Written in Worpswede, near Bremen, Germany on 16 July 1903 – Rilke describes love and sexuality, encouraging the young poet to love questions rather than answers. He writes that:

"Physical lust is a sensuous experience no different from innocently viewing something, or from the feeling of pure delight when a wonderful ripe fruit fills the tongue. It is a glorious infinite experience granted us, a gift of knowledge from the world, the fullness and radiance of all knowing. It is not bad that we welcome it. What is bad is that almost all misuse and waste it. They set it out as a lure in dreary places of their lives and use it as a distraction rather than as a focus on great heights."

And he goes on to describe the relationship between spiritual creativity and physical desire and satisfaction.

Rilke also elaborates on the limitations of a gendered world-view introduced in his third letter. He writes that:

"Perhaps the sexes are more closely related than one would think. Perhaps the great renewal of the world will consist of this, that man and woman, freed of all confused feelings and desires, shall no longer seek each other as opposites, but simply as members of a family and neighbors, and will unite as human beings, in order to simply, earnestly, patiently, and jointly bear the heavy responsibility of sexuality that has been entrusted to them."

The fourth letter concludes with an affirmation of Mr. Kappus's choice of career in the military, telling him to "Wait patiently to see if your inner life feels restricted by the conditions of this career."

=== The fifth letter ===
Written in Rome, Italy on 29 October 1903 – Rilke opens the letter with complaints about Rome, at first claiming it "exudes a death-like, dreary atmosphere, typical of museums." He finds that the abundance of historical objects preserved throughout the city is stifling to daily life, that they assert a connection to Roman history purely coincidental, for it is "of another era and another kind of life, which is not ours and should not be considered as our own." He describes the tourist attractions as "over-rated."

But then Rilke describes his process of realizing Rome's beauty, telling the young poet that "there is much beauty here because there is much beauty everywhere." Rilke comes to see beauty in the ancient aqueducts, the city gardens, and the Renaissance sculptures and architecture.

=== The sixth letter ===
Written in Rome, Italy on 23 December 1903 – Rilke reminds the young poet of the benefits of solitude, telling him:

"To be lonely as one was lonely as a child, while adults were moving about, entangled with things that seemed big and important, because the grownups looked so busy and because one could not understand any of their doings — that must be the goal. And when you realize one day that their activities are superficial, that their careers are paralyzed and no longer linked with life, then why not look at the world as a child would see it — out of the depths of your own world, out of the breadth of your own aloneness, which is itself work and rank and career?"

Rilke goes on to warn the reader of the pitfalls of social or career ambitions. He is writing in the days leading up to Christmas, and focuses the end of his letter on the process of finding God.

=== The seventh letter ===
Written in Rome, Italy on 14 May 1904 – Rilke focuses this letter on love and relationships, specifically on the necessity of aloneness. He writes:

"It is true that many young people who do not love rightly, who simply surrender themselves and leave no room for aloneness, experience the depressing feeling of failure."

=== The eighth letter ===
Written in Flädie, Sweden on 12 August 1904 – Rilke writes about grief and sadness, telling the young poet to let such "moments of tension" pass like all other moments are destined to.

=== The ninth letter ===
Written in Jonsered, Sweden on 4 November 1904 – Feelings and discipline are discussed in brief, though the ninth and tenth letters are Rilke's shortest, with minimal elaboration such themes.

=== The tenth letter ===
Written in Paris, France on 26 December 1908 – Short in length, Rilke's tenth and final published letter concludes with a short discussion of art as a way of life. He expresses skepticism of "half-artistic" careers, and he encourages the young poet to remain strong in his resolve.

== See also ==
- Art of Mentoring
