= The Red Rider (novel) =

1922 novel by Franz Xaver Kappus

- Author: Franz Xaver Kappus
- Language: German
- Genre: Drama
- Publisher: Helikon
- Publication date: 1922
- Publication place: Germany
- Media type: Print

The Red Rider (German: Der rote Reiter) is a 1922 dramatic novel by the Austrian writer Franz Xaver Kappus.

== Adaptations ==
It has been made into films on two occasions. A 1923 silent film The Red Rider starring Fern Andra and a 1935 sound film The Red Rider directed by Rolf Randolf and starring Iván Petrovich and Camilla Horn.

== Bibliography ==
- James L. Limbacher. Haven't I seen you somewhere before?: Remakes, sequels, and series in motion pictures and television, 1896-1978. Pierian Press, 1979.
