= The Red Rider (1923 film) =

1923 film

- Directed by: Franz W. Koebner
- Based on: The Red Rider by Franz Xaver Kappus
- Produced by: Georg Bluen
- Starring: Fern Andra; Albert Steinrück; Carola Toelle
- Cinematography: Hans Aufhauser; Franz Stein; Otto Tober
- Production company: Fern Andra-Film
- Release date: 15 June 1923
- Country: Germany
- Languages: Silent; German intertitles

The Red Rider (German: Der rote Reiter) is a 1923 German silent film directed by Franz W. Koebner and starring Fern Andra, Albert Steinrück and Carola Toelle. It premiered at the Marmorhaus in Berlin. It is based on the 1922 novel of the same title by Franz Xaver Kappus, later adapted into a 1935 sound film The Red Rider.

== Cast ==
- Fern Andra
- Albert Steinrück
- Carola Toelle
- Hans Junkermann
- Julius Falkenstein
- Ferdinand von Alten
- Ludwig Salm
- Ilka Grüning
- Arnold Korff
- Frida Richard
- Kurt Bobeth-Bolander
- Fritz Schulz

== Bibliography ==
- Grange, William. Cultural Chronicle of the Weimar Republic. Scarecrow Press, 2008.
