= The Red Rider (1935 film) =

- Directed by: Rolf Randolf
- Written by: Hans Vietzke; Max Wallner
- Based on: The Red Rider by Franz Xaver Kappus
- Produced by: Artur Kiekebusch-Brenken; Rolf Randolf
- Starring: Iván Petrovich; Camilla Horn; Friedrich Ulmer
- Cinematography: Hugo von Kaweczynski
- Edited by: Wolfgang Wehrum
- Music by: Fritz Wenneis
- Production company: Rolf Randolf-Film
- Distributed by: Phönix-Filmverleih
- Release date: 1 February 1935
- Running time: 93 minutes
- Country: Germany
- Language: German

The Red Rider (German: Der rote Reiter) is a 1935 German drama film directed by Rolf Randolf and starring Iván Petrovich, Camilla Horn and Friedrich Ulmer.

== Background ==
It is based on the 1922 novel of the same title by Franz Xaver Kappus which had previously been made into a 1923 silent film.

The film's sets were designed by the art director Wilhelm Depenau and Erich Zander.

== Cast ==
- Iván Petrovich as Rittmeister Otto von Wellisch
- Camilla Horn as Hasia Nowrowska
- Friedrich Ulmer as Generaldirektor Livius
- Marieluise Claudius as Etelka, seine Tochter
- Veit Harlan as Andreas, sein Sohn
- Kurt Vespermann as Leutnant Biegl
- Oskar Sima as Schopf, ein Agent
- Bruno Ziener as Heckeli
- Dorothea Thiess as Mascha
- Michael von Newlinsky
- Ernst Rotmund
- Hans Schneider
- Alfred Stein
- Arthur Reppert
- Karl Falkenberg

== Bibliography ==
- Noack, Frank. Veit Harlan: The Life and Work of a Nazi Filmmaker. University Press of Kentucky, 2016.
