= Operation Atlantis (film) =

- Original film poster
- Directed by: Domenico Paolella
- Written by: Víctor Auz
- Produced by: Ferdinand Felicioni
- Starring: John Ericson
- Cinematography: Marcello Masciocchi, Francisco Sánchez
- Edited by: Antonietta Zita
- Music by: Teo Usuelli
- Release date: 22 October 1965
- Running time: 100 minutes
- Country: Italy
- Language: Italian

Agente S 03: Operazione Atlantide or Operation Atlantis is a 1965 Italian spy film adventure directed by Domenico Paolella.

Italian film critic Marco Giusti refers to the film as "craziness" and describes it as a mixture of peplum, science fiction and Eurospy.

== Cast ==
- John Ericson ... George Steele
- Bernardina Sarrocco ... Albia (as Berna Rock)
- Cristina Gajoni
- María Granada ... Fatma
- Carlo Hinterman ... Prof. Reich
- Beni Deus ... Ben Ullah
- José Manuel Martín ... Nailawi
- Erika Blanc ... Kate
- Dario Michaelis
- Dario De Grassi
- Luigi Tosi
- Mino Doro
- Franco Ressel
- Tullio Altamura
- Tina Conte
- Renato Terra
