= Rhapsody (film) =

1954 American musical romance drama film

- Theatrical release poster
- Directed by: Charles Vidor
- Written by: Ruth Goetz; Augustus Goetz
- Screenplay by: Fay Kanin; Michael Kanin
- Based on: Maurice Guest; 1908 novel by Henry Handel Richardson
- Produced by: Lawrence Weingarten
- Starring: Elizabeth Taylor; Vittorio Gassman; John Ericson; Louis Calhern
- Cinematography: Robert H. Planck
- Edited by: John Dunning
- Music by: Bronisław Kaper (adaptor); Johnny Green (conductor / musical director); Michael Rabin (violin solos); Claudio Arrau (piano solos)
- Production company: Metro-Goldwyn-Mayer
- Distributed by: Metro-Goldwyn-Mayer
- Release date: March 11, 1954
- Running time: 115 minutes
- Country: United States
- Language: English
- Budget: $1,979,000
- Box office: $3,292,000

Rhapsody is a 1954 American musical drama film directed by Charles Vidor and starring Elizabeth Taylor, Vittorio Gassman, John Ericson, and Louis Calhern based on the 1908 novel Maurice Guest by Henry Handel Richardson.

It revolves around a debutante who follows the man she loves and hopes to marry to Zürich where he studies violin at a conservatory. There she meets a piano student who falls madly in love with her. She must then choose between this man who loves her more than his music and the violinist who loves his music more than anything else. Rhapsody features music by Franz Liszt, Sergei Rachmaninov, Pyotr Ilyich Tchaikovsky, Felix Mendelssohn, Claude Debussy, and Pablo de Sarasate.

== Plot ==
The film opens with debutante Louise Durant (Elizabeth Taylor) announcing to her haughty father (played by Louis Calhern) that she is leaving their luxurious home to go to Zürich with her lover—an aspiring violinist, Paul Bronte (Vittorio Gassman). Her father disapproves. She cannot leave, because he needs her as hostess of his luncheon of VIPs. He sees no reason to waste time with aspiring artists, when he has the cream of the crop at the luncheon she is about to miss. Besides, she lacks the discipline to study piano at the conservatory. She scoffs, "You'll see. Have you ever stopped me from doing what I want?" He replies "No".

The couple joyfully motor to Zürich in a convertible. Bronte playfully muses how crazy it is to take her, when he must work.

In Zürich, the couple bring Durant's bags to her elegant furnished flat. Paul inquires about the "For Rent" sign that the matron (played by Celia Lovsky) had just removed from the front window. She explains that the attic had just been rented to an American (James Guest, played by John Ericson). When the affable Guest shows, Bronte tries unsuccessfully to convince Guest that he must give his room to Bronte because of seniority. Guest won't be conned. Guest is immediately infatuated with Durant, but she doesn't notice, while Bronte lets him know she is off-limits.

Durant goes to the conservatory to audition. While waiting, she is enraptured with the piano player before her. She is pleased to discover it is Guest. The professor who oversaw the audition ushers in Bronte. They practice while Durant impatiently waits.

Tension mounts as Bronte prioritizes practice over companionship with Durant.

When Bronte learns he is scheduled to perform at the Zürich Symphony in three weeks, he tells a deeply disappointed Durant he will have no time for her until the concert. Meanwhile, a grand piano arrives for Durant. Guest joins Durant to try out the new piano, becoming friends.

Durant's father visits her in Zürich. When she introduces him to Bronte, the father's disdain is palpable. When she asks her father if he will go to Bronte's Tchaikovsky concert at the symphony, he replies, "No. I have already heard Tchaikovsky." Yet, the father asks Bronte for a serenade. Bronte quips, "No. I only perform for pleasure or money. Something you would understand." Father admits he doesn't like Bronte's arrogance; Daughter retorts "You dislike him because he is like you and doesn't crumple like all the other men." Father correctly predicts their relationship is doomed, because Bronte can't give her the attention she needs, and he is a hummingbird that can't be caged.

Bronte's solo at the Symphony is a smashing success. During the concert Durant unsuccessfully tries to capture his attention, but he is oblivious, engrossed in the music, like everyone else but her. When she goes back stage, the joyous crowd surrounds him and she can't get near, but sees him spontaneously kiss another woman in ecstatic celebration. When music agents shuffle him off to a back room to make deals, Durant calls out to him, but he waives her off. When he leaves the room hours later, she is sulking. Energized and happy to see her, he spouts off all his future plans for a tour with a finale in Rome, but indicates she can't go with as she would be a distraction. The couple fight. He has no time for her; she is ruining the day his music career takes off.

The next day Durant sees him leave on the tour with another woman. She tries to kill herself with pills, but Guest intervenes.

Guest nurses Durant to health, giving her the cloying affection she needs. Her father approves. She is determined to leave Zürich and the awful memories. Guest, head over heals in love with a woman who only views him as a friend, is determined to go with her - even though it means giving up his music studies. She lets him follow her to Paris, where she marries him to try to get over Bronte.

Bronte bumps into Durant in Paris, and the two admit they have not fallen out of love. Meanwhile, Guest is floundering, squandering Durant's money on booze — undoubtedly not getting the romantic attention he desires. Bronte is disgusted that Durant has allowed his talent to go to rot.

When Durant tells her father she must divorce Guest, he urges her to wait. "Don't kick him when he is down. Help him get up first." She does. She moves back with him to Zürich and puts all of her focus on his musical development. Guest eventually secures a solo performance at the Symphony — nearly identical to Bronte's. But just prior to the important concert, Durant refuses to give him a token of herself for good luck. She insists he doesn't need her to succeed, that his talent is from his work alone. She confesses that she intends to leave with Bronte after the performance. Guest is devastated.

At the concert, Guest is distraught throughout performance. He repeatedly looks at the empty chair reserved for his wife. Despite his anguish, he pulls off a standing ovation. When the crowd has gone and he is about to leave alone, he discovers Durant waiting. "I thought you were leaving." Crying, she tells him she saw the entire performance. They hug as lovers.

== Cast ==
- Elizabeth Taylor as Louise Durant
- Vittorio Gassman as Paul Bronte
- John Ericson as James Guest
- Louis Calhern as Nicholas Durant
- Michael Chekhov as Prof. Schuman
- Barbara Bates as Effie Cahill
- Richard Hageman as Bruno Fürst
- Richard Lupino as Otto Krafft
- Celia Lovsky as Frau Sigerlist
- Stuart Whitman as Dove
- Madge Blake as Mrs. Cahill
- Jack Raine as Edmund Streller
- Birgit Nielsen as Madeleine
- Jacqueline Duval as Yvonne
- Gordon Richards as English Butler
- Norma Nevens as Student Pianist

== Production ==
The novel Maurice Guest was published in 1908.

Rhapsody was filmed on location in Florhofgasse, Zürich (the street scenes) and Pontresina, Kanton Graubünden in Switzerland.

== Reception ==
According to MGM records, the film earned $1,291,000 in the U.S. and Canada and $2,001,000 in other markets, resulting in a loss of $217,000. The movie was re-released in February 1962 to benefit from the publicity created for the movie Cleopatra.

The film is recognized by American Film Institute in these lists:

- 2002: AFI's 100 Years...100 Passions – Nominated
