= Niels Lyhne =

1880 novel by Jens Peter Jacobsen

Niels Lyhne is an 1880 novel written by the Danish author Jens Peter Jacobsen.

== General description ==
A naturalistic work, Niels Lyhne is considered to be part of the Modern Breakthrough, a style of Realism native to Scandinavia; however, the novel does contain several romantic elements, and it relies and expands on romantic themes (examination of individual struggle and consciousness; artistic expression and inspiration), while it also ironizes them. The story chronicles the titular character's renunciation of his faith, his various bereavements and, ultimately, it depicts his disillusionment and his death. This disillusionment is part and parcel of the work's naturalism—focusing on his failures as a lover and as an artist, Niels Lyhne demonstrates the individual's helplessness and serves as a critique of atheism as well as faith.

Georg Lukács cites the novel in his influential Meaning of Contemporary Realism as the "first novel to describe this state of mind of the atheistic bourgeois intelligentsia".

Rainer Maria Rilke, in Letters to a Young Poet, cites the Bible and Jacobsen's work as the two books most worth reading. Since a focus of Niels Lyhne is how the nonbeliever deals with death, in pairing this novel with the Bible, Rilke sets the unwary young poet upon the dialectic. Further, this work may be considered a forerunner of the existentialist novels of mid-20th-century France.

== Translations into English ==
The novel was translated as Siren Voices (1896) by Ethel F. L. Robertson (otherwise known by her nom de plume, Henry Handel Richardson). A translation by Hanna Astrup Larsen was published in 1919, followed by a third translation in 1990 by Tiina Nunnally (Fjord Press, 1990; Penguin, 2006).
