= Maurice Guest (novel) =

1908 novel written by Henry Handel Richardson

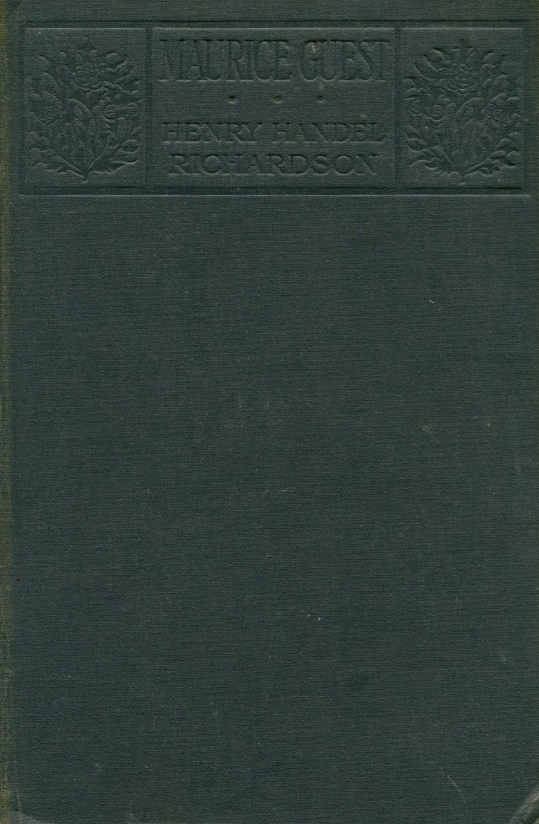
- Author: Henry Handel Richardson
- Language: English
- Publisher: Heinemann, London
- Publication date: 1908
- Media type: Print (hardback & paperback)
- Pages: 562 pp
- Preceded by: –
- Followed by: The Getting of Wisdom

Maurice Guest (1908) is the debut novel by Australian writer Henry Handel Richardson.

== Plot summary ==
In turn-of-the-century Leipzig, Maurice Guest, a young English provincial, falls madly in love with an Australian woman, Louise Dufrayer. The novel follows this doomed affair to its tragic end.

== Reviews ==
A reviewer in The Age found some difficulty with the book, noting that "while the book is undoubtedly clever, it runs to the inordinate length of 562 pages, and is more like a scientific dissection of the love theme than the romance that the ordinary reader likes. Nor is the book quite healthy in tone. Stalwart manhood and woman hood are absent from its pages, which are occupied mostly in a study of the almost neurotic psychology, in which many authors seem to delighted. Mr. Richardson has the ability to write healthier and brisker books, if not cleverer ones, than Maurice Guest."

In a short review in The Sydney Morning Herald the reviewer noted. It is very long for a modern novel, but it shows a finished style and considerable powers of analysis. The picture of life in Leipzig is very minute, and though the detail is rather overwhelming, it all fits in its place. Mr. Richardson is to be congratulated on a fine and careful piece of work of more than ephemeral interest.

== See also ==
- The full text of the novel is available at Project Gutenberg.
- 1908 in Australian literature

== Notes ==
Dedication : To Louise

The novel was deemed too controversial to be published as Richardson intended, and she was forced to cut twenty thousand words from the original manuscript and tone down its language.

Text Publishing re-issued the novel in September 2012 as part of its Text Classics series with an introduction by Carmen Callil.

== Film adaptation ==
The novel was adapted for the screen under the title Rhapsody in 1954. The film was directed by Charles Vidor, from a script by Ruth Goetz and Augustus Goetz, and featured Elizabeth Taylor, Vittorio Gassman, John Ericson, and Louis Calhern.
