= Franz Xaver Kappus =

Military officer, journalist, editor and writer from Austria

- Born: 17 May 1883; Temesvár, Bánság, Austria-Hungary
- Died: 9 October 1966 (aged 83); East Berlin, East Germany
- Writing career
- Language: German
- Notable works: Die lebenden Vierzehn; Die Peitsche im Antlitz; The Red Rider; Letters to a Young Poet; Martina und der Tänzer; Brautfahrt um Lena; Flammende Schatten; Flucht in die Liebe
- Military career
- Allegiance: Austria-Hungary
- Branch: Army
- Rank: Officer

Franz Xaver Kappus (17 May 1883 – 9 October 1966) was an Austrian military officer, journalist, editor and writer who wrote poetry, short-stories, novels and screenplays. Kappus is known chiefly as the military academy cadet who wrote to Austrian poet Rainer Maria Rilke (1875–1926) for advice in a series of letters from 1902 to 1908 that were assembled and published in the best-selling book Letters to a Young Poet (1929).

== Life ==
Franz Xaver Kappus was born on 17 May 1883 in Timișoara (also known as German: Temeschwar, Temeschburg or Temeswar, in Hungarian: Temesvár), in the Banat province of the Austro-Hungarian Empire. The Banat region (now divided between Hungary, Serbia and Romania) was populated with a large population of ethnic Germans known as Banat Swabians or Danube Swabians of which Kappus' ancestry is derived. As a 19-year-old officer cadet at the Theresian Military Academy in Wiener Neustadt, Lower Austria, Kappus wrote to Rainer Maria Rilke after learning that as a young man, Rilke, the son of an Austrian army officer, had studied at the academy's lower school at Sankt Pölten in the 1890s. Kappus corresponded with Rilke, then a popular poet at the beginning of his career, in a series of letters from 1902 to 1908, in which he sought Rilke's advice regarding the quality of his poetry, and in deciding between a literary career or a career as an officer in the Austro-Hungarian Army.

Aside from his role in writing to Rilke and later publishing these letters, Kappus is largely forgotten by history. Despite the hesitancy he expressed in his letters to Rilke about pursuing a military career, he continued his military studies and served for 15 years as an officer in the Austro-Hungarian Army. During the course of his life, he worked as a newspaper editor and journalist, writing poems, humorous sketches, short-stories, novels, and adapted several works (including his own) into screenplays for films in the 1930s. However, Kappus did not achieve lasting fame. After World War I, he was the editor of several newspapers, including Kappus Deutsche Wacht (trans. "Kappus' German Watch"), later known as Banater Tagblatt (trans. "Banat Daily"), and other newspapers Temeswarer Zeitung (trans. "Timișoara Newspaper"), and the Schwäbische Volkspresse (trans. "Swabian People's Press").

On 16 June 1945, shortly after the fall of Nazi Germany, he was part of a group in Berlin that founded the Liberal Democratic Party of Germany (initially intending to re-use the name "Deutsche Demokratische Partei" of a Weimar-era party), becoming one of its board members. The LDP later became one of the bloc parties under the East German communist regime, after whose fall it merged in 1990 with the West German Freie Demokratische Partei (trans. "Free Democratic Party"), which is affiliated with ideology of classical liberalism.

Kappus died on 9 October 1966 in East Berlin at the age of 83.

== Works ==
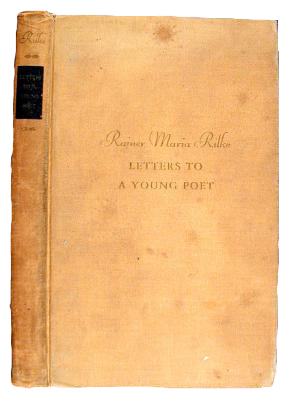
The first English translation of Rilke's Letters to a Young Poet, published in 1934. Kappus had compiled ten letters he received from Austrian poet Rainer Maria Rilke between 1902 and 1908 and published them in Germany in 1929.

=== Novels ===
- 1918: Die lebenden Vierzehn (trans. "Fourteen Survivors")
- 1921: Die Peitsche im Antlitz (trans. "The whip in the Face")
- 1922: Der Rote Reiter (trans. "The Red Rider")
- 1929: Briefe an einen jungen Dichter (trans. "Letters to a Young Poet")
- 1929: Martina und der Tänzer (trans. "Martina and the Dancers")
- 1935: Brautfahrt um Lena (trans. "Lena, spoken for")
- 1941: Flammende Schatten (trans. "Blazing Shadows")
- 1949: Flucht in die Liebe (trans. "Escape into Love")

=== Screenwriter ===
- 1923: Der Rote Reiter (trans. The Red Rider), from his novel
- 1926: The Woman in Gold
- 1926: Les voleurs de gloire
- 1935: Der Rote Reiter (trans. The Red Rider), from his novel, directed by Rolf Randolf
- 1944: The man to whom they stole the name

== See also ==
- German literature
- Lists of authors
- List of German-language authors
- List of German-language poets
