= Jens Peter Jacobsen =

Danish novelist, poet, and scientist (1847–1885)

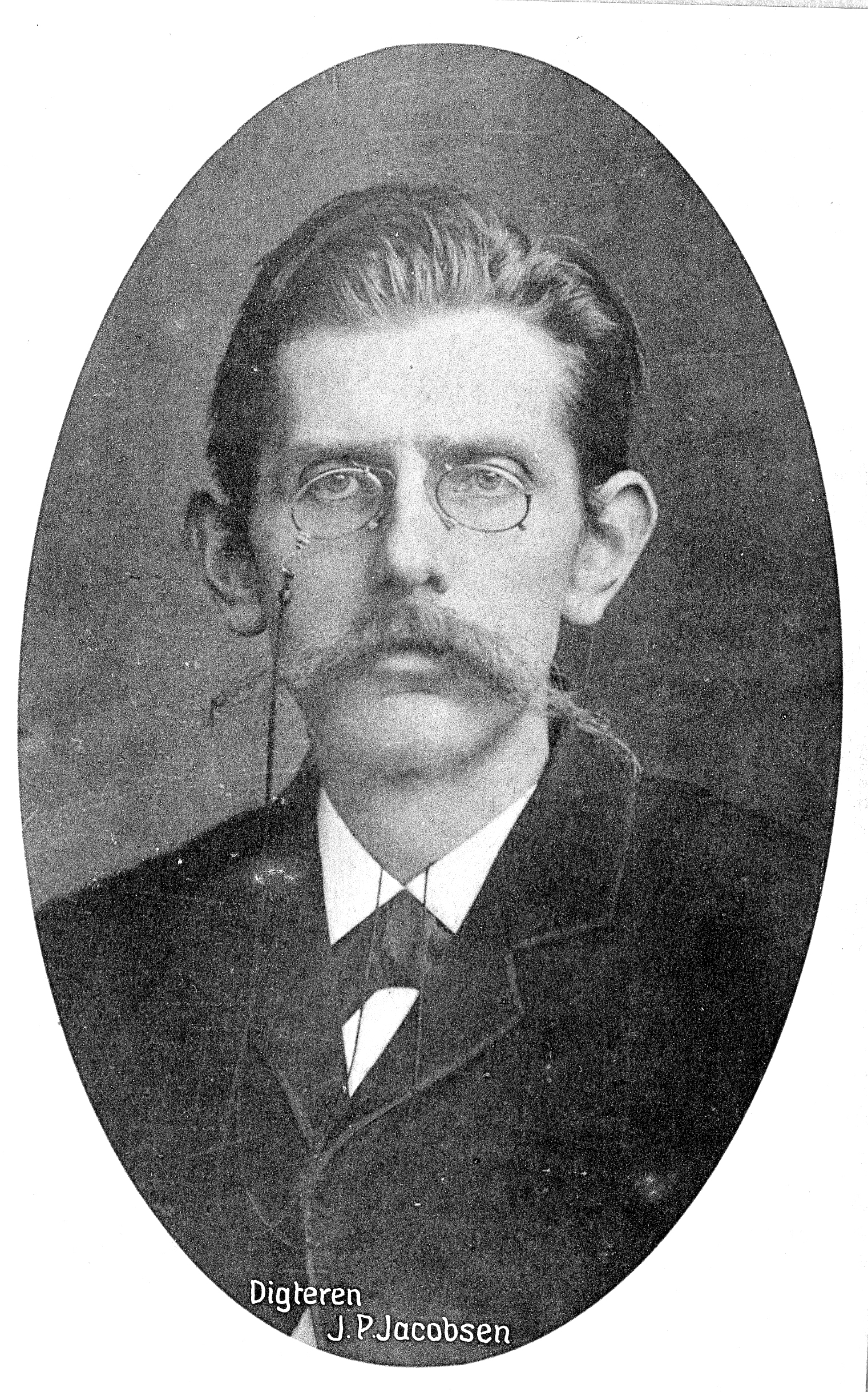
- Born: 7 April 1847; Thisted, Denmark
- Died: 30 April 1885 (aged 38); Thisted, Denmark
- Occupation: Writer

Jens Peter Jacobsen (7 April 1847 – 30 April 1885) was a Danish novelist, poet, and scientist, in Denmark often just written as "J. P. Jacobsen". He began the naturalist movement in Danish literature and was a part of the Modern Breakthrough.

== Biography ==
Jacobsen was born in Thisted in Jutland, the eldest of the four children of a prosperous merchant. He went to school in Copenhagen and was a student at the University of Copenhagen in 1868. As a boy, he showed a remarkable talent for science, in particular botany. In 1870, although he was already secretly writing poetry, Jacobsen adopted botany as a profession. He was sent by a scientific body in Copenhagen to report on the flora of the islands of Anholt and Læsø.

Around this time, the discoveries of Charles Darwin began to fascinate him. Realizing that the work of Darwin was not well known in Denmark, he translated The Origin of Species and The Descent of Man into Danish.

When still young, Jacobsen was struck by tuberculosis which eventually ended his life. His illness prompted travels to southern Europe, cut him off from scientific investigation, and drove him to literature. He met the famous critic Georg Brandes, who was struck by his powers of expression, and under his influence, in the spring of 1873, Jacobsen began his great historical romance, Marie Grubbe.

Jacobsen was an atheist.

== Literary works ==
Jacobsen's canon consists of two novels, seven short stories, and one posthumous volume of poetry—small, but enough to place him as one of the most influential Danish writers.

=== Prose ===
The historical novel Fru Marie Grubbe (1876, Eng. transl.: Marie Grubbe: A Lady of the Seventeenth Century 1917) is the first Danish treatment of a woman as a sexual creature. Based upon the life of a 17th-century Danish noblewoman, it charts her downfall from a member of the royal family to the wife of a ferryman, as a result of her desire for an independent and satisfying erotic life. In many ways the book anticipates the themes of D. H. Lawrence.

Jacobsen's second novel Niels Lyhne (1880, English translation 1919) traces the fate of an atheist in a merciless world: his lack of faith is "tested" by tragedies and personal crises until he dies in war, disillusioned but unrepentant. According to biographer Morten Høi Jensen, the novel anticipates the work of Albert Camus.

Jacobsen's short stories are collected in Mogens og andre Noveller (1882, translated as Mogens and Other Tales, 1921, and Mogens and Other Stories, 1994). Among them must be mentioned "Mogens" (1872, his official debut), the tale of a young dreamer and his maturing during love, sorrow and new hope of love. "Et Skud i Taagen" ("A Shot in the Fog") is a Poe-inspired tale of the sterility of hatred and revenge. "Pesten i Bergamo" ("The Plague of Bergamo") shows people clinging to religion even when tempted to be "free men". Fru Fønss (1882) is a sad story about a widow's tragic break with her egoistic children when she wants to remarry.

Mogens og andre Noveller and Niels Lyhne were both highly praised by Rainer Maria Rilke in his letters to Franz Xaver Kappus, translated as Letters to a Young Poet.

=== Poetry ===
The poems of Jacobsen are more influenced by late romanticism than his prose. Many of them are wistful, dreamy and melancholic but also naturalistic. Most important is the great obscure poem "Arabesque to a Hand-drawing by Michel Angelo" (about 1875) the idea of which seems to be that art is going to replace immortality as the meaning of life. They significantly inspired the Danish symbolist poetry of the 1890s.

== Legacy ==
Unlike many of his colleagues, Jacobsen did not take much interest in politics, his main interests being science and psychology. He is primarily an artist: his ability to create "paintings" and arabesque-like scenes both in his prose and his poetry (which has sometimes been criticized as "mannered") is one of the secrets of his art. It has been said that his novels are a presentation of various snapshots rather than tales of action.

In spite of his not very extensive œuvre, Jacobsen's international influence has been quite strong. In Germany both his novels and poems were widely read and they are known to have influenced Thomas Mann, as well as the Englishmen George Gissing and D. H. Lawrence. Gissing read the Reclam edition of Niels Lyhne in 1889 and again in 1890 when he wrote 'which I admire more than ever'. Jacobsen's works also greatly inspired Rainer Maria Rilke's prose: in Briefe an einen jungen Dichter (trans. Letters to a Young Poet) (1929) Rilke recommends to Franz Xaver Kappus to read the works of Jacobsen, adding that Rilke always carried the Bible and Jacobsen's collected works. Further, Rilke's only novel Die Aufzeichnungen des Malte Laurids Brigge (translated as The Notebooks of Malte Laurids Brigge) (1910) is semi-autobiographical but is heavily influenced by Jacobsen's second novel Niels Lyhne (1880) which traces the fate of an atheist in a merciless world.

Jacobsen also influenced many other authors of the turn of the 20th century, including Henrik Ibsen, Sigmund Freud, Hermann Hesse, Stefan Zweig, and T. E. Lawrence, who all commented on his work. Thomas Mann once told an interviewer that "perhaps it is J. P. Jacobsen who has had the greatest influence on my style so far."

He also had a musical influence: Frederick Delius's Fennimore and Gerda and Arnold Schoenberg's Gurre-Lieder are based upon themes from Jacobsen's books. Schoenberg also set a Jacobsen text, translated by Robert Franz Arnold, as No. 4 of his Six Songs, Op. 3.

Jacobsen's Samlede Skrifter is featured in the Hong Kong Disneyland theme park in Tarzan's Treehouse as one of the books salvaged from a shipwreck.

== Works ==
- Mogens (1872)
- Fru Marie Grubbe (1876)
- Niels Lyhne (1880)
- Pesten i Bergamo (1881)
- Mogens og andre Noveller (1882)
- Digte (1886)
- Skitser og Udkast (1886)

=== About J. P. Jacobsen ===
A Difficult Death: The Life and Work of Jens Peter Jacobsen by Morten Høi Jensen, 2017, Yale University Press (978–0300218930)

=== In English ===
- J. P. Jacobsen: Siren Voices. London, 1896. Translated by Miss F. L. Robertson
- J. P. Jacobsen: Marie Grubbe. A Lady of the Seventeenth Century. Gloucester, Mass., 1975.
- Jens Peter Jacobsen: Mogens and Other Stories. Seattle, 1994.
- Jens Peter Jacobsen: Niels Lyhne. Seattle, 1990; New York, 2006 (ISBN 0143039814).
