= The Fortunes of Richard Mahony =

Novel by Henry Handel Richardson

- Author: Henry Handel Richardson
- Cover artist: Sheila Perry (1954)
- Language: English
- Genre: Novel
- Publisher: William Heinemann Ltd
- Publication date: 1917 (vol 1), 1925 (vol. 2), 1929 (vol. 3), 1930 (collected)
- Publication place: Australia
- Media type: Print (hardback & paperback)
- Pages: 831

The Fortunes of Richard Mahony is a three-part novel by Australian writer Ethel Florence Lindesay Richardson under her pen name, Henry Handel Richardson. It consists of Australia Felix (1917), The Way Home (1925), and Ultima Thule (1929). It was collected in 1930 under the title by which it is now best known. Its publisher, William Heinemann Ltd, claimed on the jacket to the 1965 edition, "This is now recognized as one of the greatest novels in the English language." It was acclaimed for its rich characterizations and then-startling depiction of mental illness attacking an otherwise respectable person, while his much-younger wife, who does not think herself clever, must become resourceful with a high-level of uncomfortable capability. In recent years, it has been recognised as a graphic description of the onset and evolution of young onset dementia caused by neurosyphilis, the condition from which her father died.

The book is based, at least in outline, on events in the life of Richardson's parents, Walter Lindesay Richardson and Mary Bailey, though it should not be considered a biography, as many major and minor changes were made. The publisher originally balked at publishing the third volume (after the first two had modest sales) without persuasion from Richardson's husband. Only when the third volume appeared was it hailed as a great novel. Ultima Thule won the Australian Literature Society Gold Medal for 1929.

An early American edition of the book contained an introduction by Sinclair Lewis in which he erroneously claimed that Richardson's true name was Henrietta, with no mention of Ethel. A new 3-volume edition was released by Australian Scholarly Publishing in December 2007. A new one-volume edition, with a new introduction by Peter Craven, was issued in Australia by Text Publishing in its Text Classics series in 2012.

== Australia Felix ==
Australia Felix was originally published as The Fortunes of Richard Mahony: Australia Felix, with the subtitle appearing only on the title page.

"Australia Felix" is a description used by explorer Major Thomas Mitchell in 1836 for the lush plains he discovered between the Murray River and the south coast of Victoria, including the area that later became the site of Ballarat.

=== Part One ===
Nine chapters and a prologue introducing us to Dr. Richard Townshend-Mahony, F.R.C.S., M.D., Edinburgh, for two years the proprietor of Diggers' Emporium in Ballarat township, near Melbourne, which he runs with his assistants Long Jim and Ebenezer Hempel. He came to the goldfields in 1852 based on advertising that made gold seem easy to acquire. He was accompanied by his best friend, Purdy Smith, an Englishman with whom he has little in common, but is more refined than typical diggers like old lawyer Ocock and his son, Tom, and later, his older son, Henry. The fact that Mahony refuses to partake of alcohol on even a social level often causes others to dislike him.

A large portion of the first part deals with Mahony's courtship of fifteen-year-old Polly Turnham, who works as a servant at the Beamish Hotel, and with his sleeping with the two plump Beamish sisters, Tilly and Jinny. The sisters are virtually indistinguishable save for their eye color, and they insist on mispronouncing Richard's surname "Ma-hon-y", though the accent is supposed to be on the first syllable. After working with her brother, Ned, and facing a battery of questions from her elder brother, John, Richard is able to marry Polly. John and his beautiful wife Emma are unable to attend when the latter falls ill. Also arriving for the wedding is Polly's older sister, Sarah.

=== Part Two ===
Eight chapters. The store unprofitable, Polly is displeased with the dirt floor shack Richard calls home. Richard takes up medicine at Polly's prompting and she helps Richard build a successful practice in Ballarat. John has gone temporarily mad when his wife's illness leads to her death. He was so devoted to her that he needs the children removed from his home while he recovers from his grief. Polly miscarries, and is more than happy to take in the children, Emma (Trotty, later Emmy), Johnny, and Jerry, along with Sarah. Sarah takes on a new name, Sara "(spoken Sahra)". Mahony & Polly move to a new house.

=== Part Three ===
Eleven chapters. Mahony begins a longstanding habit of shutting himself away reading religion and philosophy, starring with Lamarck and De Maillet, coming from a baseline of Irish Protestantism, and wanting to release God from the "dead-letterism from which the centuries had accumulated about Him" to reveal a God of mercy. Henry Ocock courts Agnes Glenidinning, whose father is in an asylum for trying to kill her. Sara is so sick of her name being mispronounced that she changes it to Zara for a more French feel. John recovers and takes toward politics with great success, and takes the children back in.

=== Part Four ===
Twelve chapters. Ned takes to wife another Polly, so his sister begins using her real name, Mary, feeling she has outgrown the name Polly. Mahony has become rather successful as a physician, but Henry Ocock has been even more successful, which bothers Richard, who believes his relative refinement should be reflected in his earnings. Mahony does indeed become more and more successful, and Mary becomes deeply involved in the preparations for a gala to raise money for a statue of Burke and Wills. John sends his children to boarding school. The more successful Mahony gets, the more he longs to return to England. Tempted by the gold that was falsely promised, he had been wanting to extricate himself forever from Australia's soil, and he sells the house to pay for the journey, desiring to set up a country practice in a country where the apples grow red on all sides.

== The Way Home ==
=== Proem ===
Richard is more sociable than Mary has ever seen him during the sea voyage home, and he does not appear to be as aloof and arrogant as he often was, but treating his fellow passengers sociably, many whose memories of England were dim if any, much like Mary's.

=== Part One ===
Eight chapters. Richard settles on the town of Buddlecombe, near Glasgow. He selects a more pleasant house a little farther, and uphill from the main part of town. Business is slow to develop. There is only one other doctor in town, and he is a drunk. Richard begins to hold the suspicion that the fact that he has practised in Australia is being held against him. Such suspicions are confirmed, when this Doctor Robinson is forced to call upon him for aid, Robinson gets all the credit. And when Mary is mistakenly delivered an invitation to a party at "the Hall", the finest house in the town, that was intended for a woman living in a shanty down the road, he becomes convinced that he can have no success in England, and decides he must return again to Australia.

=== Part Two ===
Nine chapters. Despite being fêted on their return to Ballarat, and its rise to "second city of Victoria" status, Richard has decided that he is the sort of person that cannot remain settled in one place, and decides that he is going to establish a practice in Melbourne, which is reasonable close enough to allow frequent contact with family and friends. He becomes wealthy through shares/dividends and no longer needs to work. He calls his new home, that he believes will be his last, Ultima Thule. Zara decides to marry Ebenezer Hempel, despite his age, for the sake of being married, as her worldly ways had gotten in the way of her finding a younger husband. Emmy spends more time with the Mahonys and Richard grows close to her. Purdy has now decided to marry Tilly. Agnes Ocock falls while holding her baby and he dies. Mahony's fortunes become so great that he lives on occasional consulting to the hospital and can afford all the books he has ever desired. He cocoons himself away with books he is constantly having special ordered from London. Mary can never respect his wishes not to be disturbed, never getting past the point of view that books are to pass the time, not essential mental exercise as they are to Richard. She is displeased that he becomes unsociable, yet he does go out on occasion. At one party in particular, he meets Lizzie Timms-Kelly, a young contralto. He is so impressed, that he brings John to meet her, who becomes smitten. Much to the distress of Emmy, John and Lizzie are married. Richard becomes much distressed at his wife's seeming illness, but it turns out that, at long last, they are to have a child. Richard, though he had wanted children before, is now less than enthusiastic about the intrusion onto his reading time, but does his best to accommodate the idea, and the child is baptized Cuthbert Hamilton Townshend-Mahony.

=== Part Three ===
Ten chapters. "Cuffy"'s birth is followed by twin girls known as the Dumplings, later identified as Lallie (Alice) and Lucie. The Dumplings are an inseparable pair. Cuffy is clearly as introverted as his father, which is seen as quite bothersome. He is very modest and hates being changed in front of others. He also gets distraught when his parents leave, despite the presence of nannies and servants. John becomes ill and passes, and Lizzie has full charge of his assets so long as she lives in his home and does not remarry, which causes Emmy's animosity, coupled with Lizzie's attention to her own biological child, to grow. Richard regrets having ever introduced them. Richard considers it important for the children's development for them to see Europe, but in order to do so, he sells the house for some inexplicable reason. He can afford to live off a great investment and eventually return, having disliked England so much on his previous visit, but his new broker, Wilding, absconds with the funds, and the Mahonys must immediately make their way back to Australia.

== Ultima Thule ==
Ultima Thule was a medieval geographic term to denote a distant place located beyond the "borders of the known world". Mahony named his house in Melbourne Ultima Thule, but the house was sold in The Way Home and was not returned to in this book, emphasizing how prematurely he had named it.

=== Part One ===
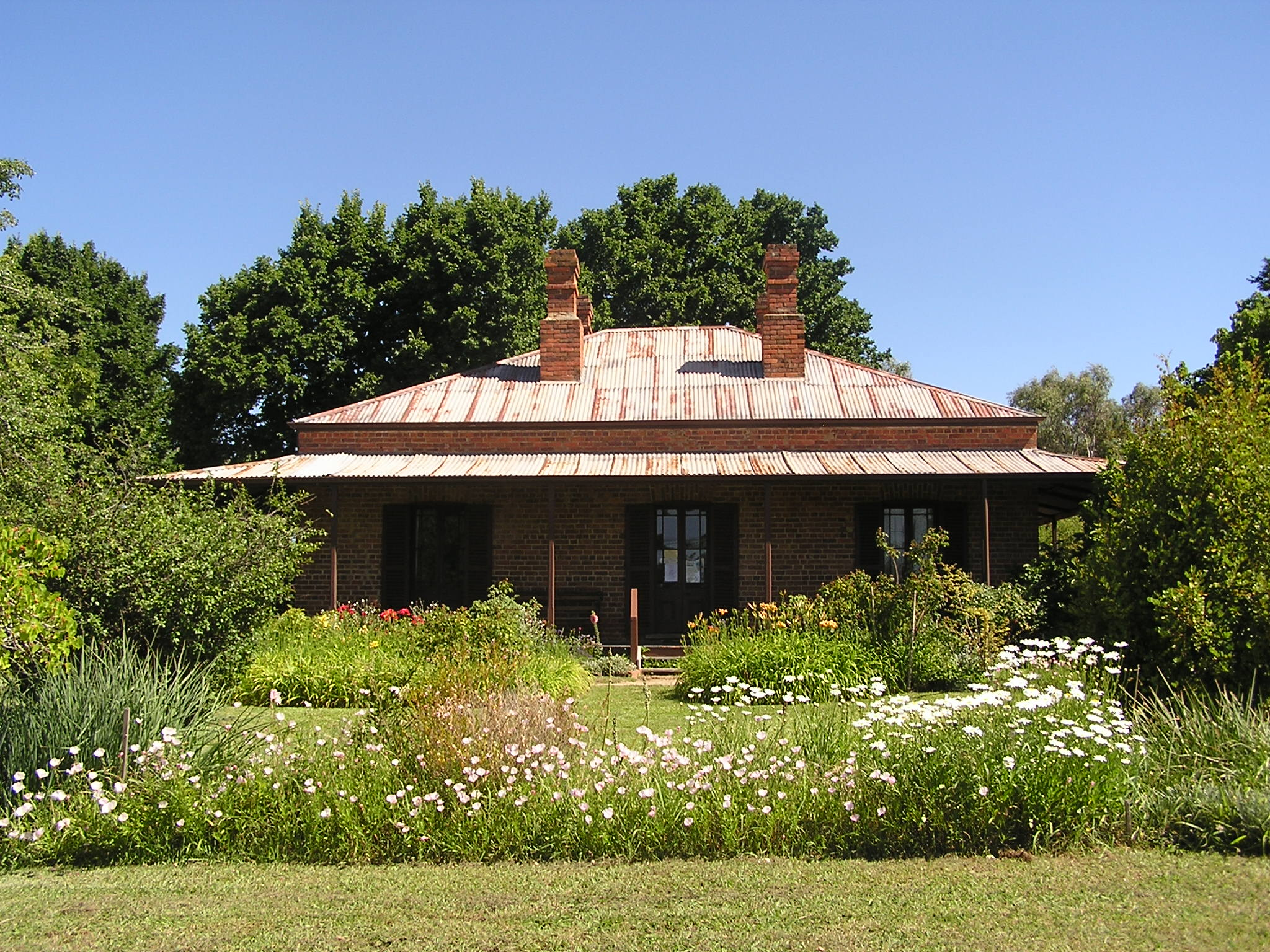
Lake View House at Chiltern, Victoria, the home of Henry Handel Richardson from July 1876 for 1 1/2 years. Richardson's early years at Chiltern featured in the novel The Fortunes of Richard Mahony. The house was accepted by the National Trust of Australia in 1967.

Ten chapters. Now forty-nine years old, Richard Mahony is broke and has to start his life over again. He salvages 3,000 pounds, but gets into debt unbeknownst to Mary still in Europe, by building a too large new house for the family to return to. His practice in Melbourne doesn't work out and he hears of a good practice at Barambogie. Chapter Five consists of letters to Mary by Richard, staying in Barambogie. He goes to the neighboring towns and eventually establishes that he wants to lease a house near a lagoon there. The house has a hall full of doors that Cuffy particularly likes, though it is near a mill where many foreigners work, and there are some concerns about security, plus the mill whistle screeches every morning at 6am. The town is largely made up of these foreigners, who consider Richard snooty for not socializing with them in taverns. Emmy stays with the Mahonys and Cuffy and the Dumplings insist on having her go over the story of the death of her stepbrother Jacky, who died in infancy, as Cuffy was denied much information when it occurred despite his care and concern.

Emmy becomes interested in Reverend Mr. Angus, who shows her a dead donkey in a pit near the lagoon that Cuffy can't wait to see, even though he is not allowed. In this, he loses an expensive new hat, so Mary sends Emmy back to Lizzie, and a governess must be hired. A Baron visits, playing works by Schumann, and offers to be Cuffy's mentor and music teacher, but Mary refuses, despite Richard's insistence that Cuffy has a great ear that she cannot help any longer. Cuffy's memory fades, leaving only his play cry "Shooh, woman!" developed with the Dumplings. He discovers that eating the kernels of green almonds are a tasty treat, and invites the Dumplings to do so. All of them get very sick, but Cuffy quickly recovers, and Lallie does not come out of it. Even bringing in another doctor fails to help her. The funeral for Alice Mary Townshend-Mahony makes Christmas for the other children a financial hardship.

=== Part Two ===
Ten chapters. Mary in deep grief takes the children on a seaside holiday at Tilly's invitation. Richard is left at home alone. Richard becomes obsessed with the idea that he has seen Lallie's spirit visit him, and that she informed him about her expensive wax doll with a nose melted in a fire. This information is true, but Mary insists that Richard already knew about it and had forgotten. He continues to become more and more interested in spiritualism. His practice virtually ends and he wonders why he had ever left Melbourne. His dislike of black armbands, an apparent obsession of the locals for funerary customs, and his dislike of prayers for the children invoking "Gentle Jesus" in favor of prayers to a universal God blessing all are seen as rather heathenistic. Mary returns after some concerning letters from Richard who is not coping in her absence. She learns of their debt and sets to work to revive Richard's ailing practice. A visit from the local bishop, even though it doesn't go well creates a boost for business. Hempel having died, Zara is installed as new governess. Richard believes his end is near and advises Cuffy to look after Mary and Lucie after he is gone, but Cuffy seems too young to understand. He is called to help a boy without being told that they suspect a broken leg, and he makes do with the equipment he has brought. At a public gathering, he is asked to speak before the Bishop, who is planning to speak on "Our glorious country: Australia". This peeves Richard so much that he goes into a diatribe that ultimately ends with reiterating the story about Lallie's doll, and gets himself ridiculed as a drunk. Mary considers blasphemous his claim that his ideas are facing the persecutions of the early Christians.

Mr. Nankivell, father of the boy he put in splints, claims that his leg is significantly shorter because he fixed it wrong, and is suing him for malpractice, claiming that he operated while drunk. All Mahony can argue is that he should go to another doctor to have it corrected, as it's not an exact science, he was working under less than optimal conditions, and surgery was never his greatest strength as a physician. Richard experiences surrealistic nightmares in which he watches himself prattle on in court like a drunken fool. He has an odd spell, ranting about things like "the Ultimate Plan" He attempts to take his own life and Mary takes matters in hand, including their finances and they leave Barambogie "like a hunted man". Mary wants him to go to Narrong, but Dr. Bowes-Smith advises that he go to Shortlands, which he believes will be better suited for the benefit of his mental health. The entire estate is sold while Richard is away making the arrangements.

=== Part Three ===
Ten chapters. The job at Shortlands requires him to board a ship in the harbor whenever a flag is raised. This involves being rowed out to the ship and climbing a rope ladder to get aboard. On his first venture, he needs to remain and spend several minutes simply resting before he makes the descent. He thinks he is too old to be able to do the job, or soon would be. Richard had previously said that he would not allow Mary to take in boarders as long as he lived, but says that because this is a resort town, it's the normal thing to do, which gives Mary the idea that he is now proclaiming that it was his idea. The town proves to be his idea, and the claim that it is respectable to take in boarders proves false. Dr. Barker, the only doctor in town, despite being semi-retired and not working nights, still gets all the business. Once summer hits in December, they are led to believe that it will grow. Cuffy deals with papa being called "cranky". Cranky in these times is being crazy. Knowing her husband's eccentricities, she thinks this is a natural product of him getting older. Even Mary has to resort to Dr. Barker when Richard gets into unexplainable fits. Tilly had stowed away 8,000 pounds in secret from her husband, and gave Mary 150 pounds at her request in her time of need. Richard has to be institutionalized—his status as a doctor getting a fifty percent discount—and Mary is advised to go to work as a postmistress, though it involves mingling with a lower class of people. She contacts Henry Ocock, Agnes's husband for advice and he arranges a postmistress job for her. For this she has to move to Gymgurra "in the Western District, some two hundred miles from Melbourne; to be reached either by night's sea voyage--round Cape Otway and along the wild coast--or by a combined train and coach journey". Mary can no longer afford Richard's accommodation at the private hospital and is persuaded to send Richard to the state mental institution. After settling in her postmistress job, Mary saves up for a trip to Melbourne to pay a surprise visit to the hospital to determine the sort of care Richard is receiving. Along the way, she meets Mrs. Bowman, whose son has been injured in tree-felling and is likely to die.

Upon reaching the hospital, she is told that "Patient 97 B" is kept in solitary confinement on the grounds that he may "corrupt" the other prisoners. She learns that his personal foibles have not been attended to: he has been throwing his meals back at his keeper because they are served to him on tin plates rather than china. Feeling he can never get well in such conditions, she asks Henry Ocock to arrange for her to remove him from the hospital and takes him to their new home at the post office, hiring Mrs. Bowman as a caregiver. He recognises Mary but does not recognize his children at their age, and wonders where his twin babies are. Cuffy begins to resent having to take him out for walks each night. Finally, he is confronted with the murderous nightmare, an image to long haunting his dreams and memories, such that seeing any body stretched out face down in the road could send him into fits, when he and Lucie are unable to stop a fall from which Richard cannot get up, and gets him laughed at for drunkenness by a passerby. Home in bed, gangrene sets in, and quickly renders the lower half of his body completely useless. Mary sits by the bedside as "Bowey" takes over the kitchen chores. Richard, finally tells Mary "not grieve...for me. I'm going...into Eternity...Dear wife". "He died at dawn, his faint breaths fluttering to rest.". Cuffy feels a mixture of relief, albeit guilty, and upset, then begging for his return, even though his experience with Lallie made clear to him that he wasn't. Richard's small funeral includes Tilly, Jerry, the parson, and the Bank manager. A small cross rose is placed on his grave, but is eventually neglected, toppled by weeds, and removed. "And thereafter, his resting-place was indistinguishable from the common ground. The rich and kindly earth of his adopted country absorbed his perishable body, as the country itself had never contrived to make its own his wayward, vagrant spirit."

== Adaptations ==
MGM announced plans to film the novel in 1946 with Greer Garson and Gregory Peck pencilled in as stars to be produced by Pandro S. Berman, but no movie resulted.

The novel was adapted as a radio play on the ABC in 1949 by Edmund Piers Barclay.

For decades, Phillip Adams has wanted to bring Richard Mahony to the screen, and has often spoken about it with director Bruce Beresford. A television miniseries was announced around 1985 and is mentioned on the jacket of Karen MacLeod's Henry Handel Richardson: A Critical Study.

One of the characters in David Williamson's play, Emerald City (1987), mocks the production's failure to find funding. The same character's summary of the screenplay is "Doctor's marriage goes bad, he goes to the goldfields, gets gangrene and dies", "a real downer".

in 2002 Currency Press published a theatrical adaptation of the novel, written by Australian playwright Michael Gow.
