= John Ericson =

American actor (1926–2020)

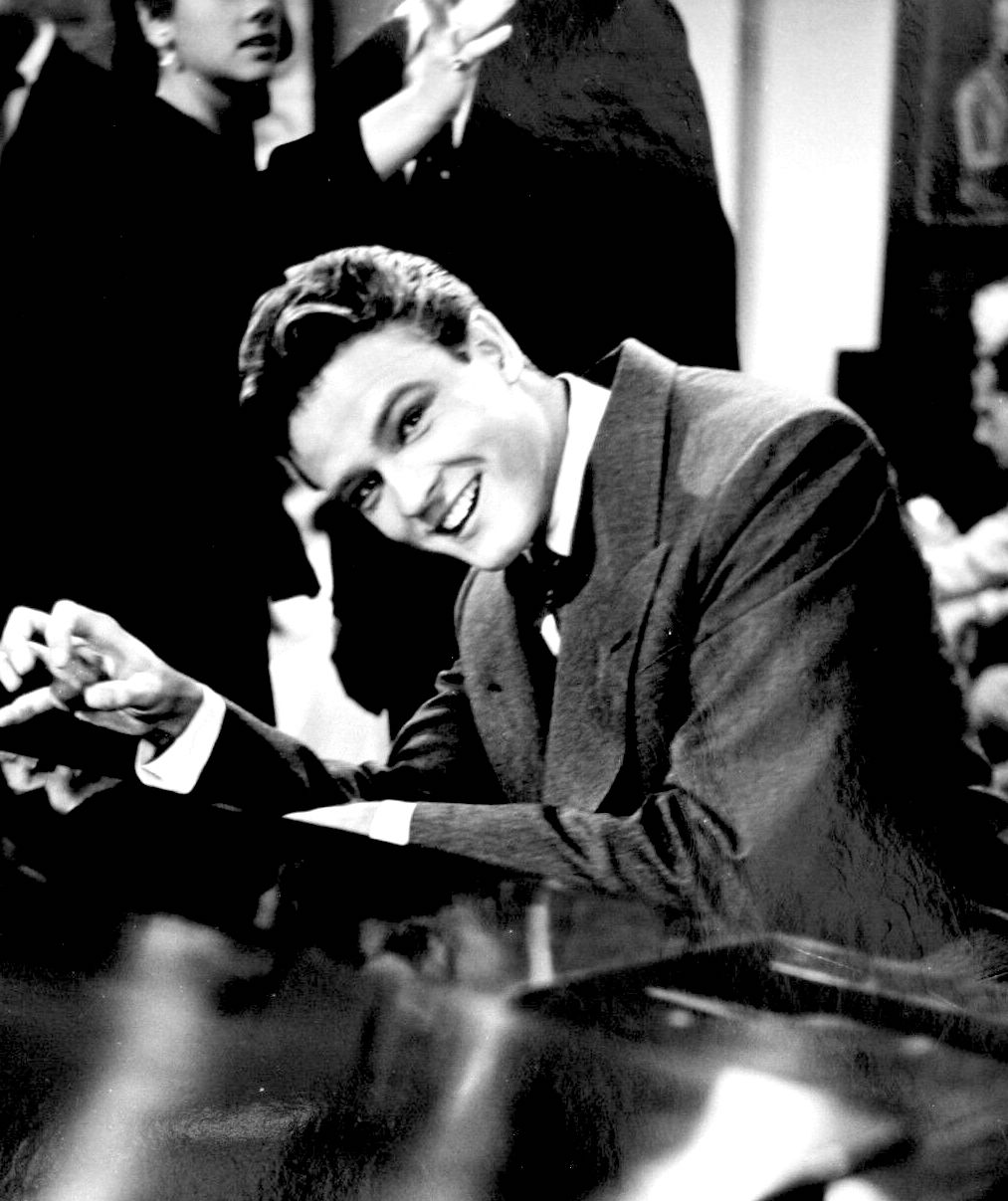
- Ericson in 1953
- Born: Joachim Alexander Ottokar Meibes; September 25, 1926; Düsseldorf, Free State of Prussia, Germany
- Died: May 3, 2020 (aged 93); Santa Fe, New Mexico, U.S.
- Education: American Academy of Dramatic Arts
- Occupation: Actor
- Years active: 1950–2008
- Spouses: Milly Coury (m. 1953; div. 1971) Karen Huston (m. 1974)
- Children: 2

John Ericson (born Joachim Alexander Ottokar Meibes; September 25, 1926 – May 3, 2020) was a German-born American actor. He was known primarily for his television work, notably as private detective Sam Bolt on the ABC series Honey West (1965–66), and his roles in several MGM films of the 1950s.

== Early life ==
Ericson's parents were Ellen Wilson, a Swedish actress and operatic star, and Carl F. Meibes, who later became president of a New York food extract corporation. The family went to the United States from Belgium when he was three. After serving in the United States Army during the latter part of World War II, he enrolled in the American Academy of Dramatic Arts, where his classmates included Grace Kelly and Don Rickles.

== Career ==
Ericson gained early acting experience with stock companies at the Gateway Theatre in Gatlinburg, Tennessee, and Barter Theatre in Abingdon, Virginia. On Broadway, he played the lead role of JJ Sefton in the original 1951 production of Stalag 17, directed by José Ferrer. The success of the play led him to be offered a contract by MGM.

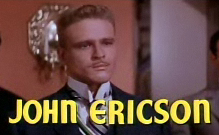
Ericson in The Student Prince (1954)

Ericson made a number of films for the studio in quick succession in the 1950s. His first appearance was in Teresa (1951), directed by Fred Zinnemann. He also appeared in Rhapsody, The Student Prince, Green Fire (all in 1954), and in Bad Day at Black Rock (1955). He co-starred with Barbara Stanwyck in Forty Guns (1957). In 1958 he appeared as Sheriff Barney Wiley in the Western Day of the Badman which starred Fred MacMurray.

For the next 30 years, his career continued mostly on television. He appeared in the lead role in "The Peter Bartley Story" of the CBS drama The Millionaire. He appeared with Dorothy Malone in the episode "Mutiny" of CBS's Appointment with Adventure (which aired on January 1, 1956). He made guest appearances in The Restless Gun (1958) and Target: The Corruptors! (1961). Ericson also guest starred twice on Bonanza: he played Vince Dagen in the 1960 episode "Breed of Violence" and he portrayed Wade Hollister in the 1967 episode "Journey to Terror". From 1965 to 1966, he co-starred as the partner of Anne Francis on Honey West. (He and Francis had played brother and sister in Bad Day at Black Rock.) In 1971, he appeared as Jack Bonham on The Men From Shiloh in the episode "The Political".

He played the title role in Pretty Boy Floyd (1960), and his other film appearances included roles in Under Ten Flags (1960), Slave Queen of Babylon (1963), 7 Faces of Dr. Lao (1964), Operation Atlantis (1965), The Money Jungle (1968), The Bamboo Saucer (1968), Bedknobs and Broomsticks (1971), and Crash! (1976). He also appeared in the stage musical On a Clear Day You Can See Forever.

In the mid-1990s, Ericson retired from acting and moved to Santa Fe, New Mexico with his wife. He briefly came out of retirement to appear in the film The Far Side of Jericho (2006) and an episode of Crash. He also appeared on local stage productions in Santa Fe.

== Personal life and death ==
Ericson was engaged to Anne Bancroft in 1951. He married twice and had a son and a daughter from his first marriage to Milly Coury. He was married to his second wife Karen Huston Ericson for 46 years.

=== Death ===
Ericson died of pneumonia on May 3, 2020, aged 93.

== Filmography ==
=== Film ===
Year	Title	Role	Notes
1951	Teresa	Philip Cass	
1951	It's a Big Country	Naval Ensign	Uncredited
1953	Rhapsody	James Guest	
1954	The Student Prince	Count Von Asterburg	
1954	Green Fire	Donald Knowland	
1955	Bad Day at Black Rock	Pete Wirth	
1955	The Return of Jack Slade	Jack Slade, Jr.	
1956	The Cruel Tower	Tom Kittredge	
1957	Forty Guns	Brockie Drummond	
1957	Oregon Passage	Lt. Niles Ord	
1958	Day of the Badman	Sheriff Barney Wiley	
1960	Pretty Boy Floyd	Pretty Boy Floyd	
1960	Under Ten Flags	Krüger	
1963	Slave Queen of Babylon	Kir	
1964	7 Faces of Dr. Lao	Ed Cunningham / Transformed Pan	
1965	Operation Atlantis	George Steele	
1967	The Vengeance of Pancho Villa	Don Diego Alvarado / Diego Owens	
1967	The Money Jungle	Blake Heller	
1968	The Destructors	Dutch Holland	
1968	The Bamboo Saucer	Fred Norwood	
1969	Black Talisman	Will Hunter	
1971	Bedknobs and Broomsticks	Col. Heller	
1975	Hustler Squad	Maj. Stonewell	
1976	Crash!	Dr. Gregg Martin	
1978	The House of the Dead	Talmudge	
1984	Final Mission	Colonel Joshua Cain	
1989	Primary Target	Phil Karlson	
2006	Birthday	Old man	Short
2006	The Far Side of Jericho	Charlie	

=== Television ===
Year	Title	Role(s)	Notes
1950	Lux Video Theatre	Mike	1 episode
1951	Studio One	Anderson	1 episode
1951	The Philco Television Playhouse		1 episode
1951	Out There		1 episode
1951–56	Kraft Theatre	Henry Cristof / Matt Wilson	2 episodes
1952	Mr. District Attorney		1 episode
1955	Star Stage	Rick	1 episode
1955–57	General Electric Theatre	Red / Wonder Boy Nick	2 episodes
1955–57	Cavalcade of America	Joe Loring / Leon Patterson	3 episodes
1956	Appointment with Adventure	The Captain	1 episode
1956	Stage 7		1 episode
1956	Chevron Hall of Stars	Salem Abercromby	2 episodes
1956–57	Climax!	Cameron Lacey / Lindy Jackson / William Herrick	3 episodes
1956–58	Schlitz Playhouse	Eddie Markham / Gunner's Mate Eddie Younger / Paul	5 episodes
1956–58	Playhouse 90	Johnny Hanneman / Leo West	2 episodes
1956–59	Zane Grey Theatre	Will Ruxton / Lane Baker / Linc Hardaway / Andy McCall	4 episodes
1956–60	Letter to Loretta	Will Hadley / Roy Hendricks / Carl Stanton	3 episodes
1958	The Millionaire	Sgt. Peter Bartley	1 episode
1958	Shirley Temple's Storybook	Brom Bones / Hiawatha	2 episodes
1958	Wagon Train	Dick Richardson	1 episode
1958–59	The Restless Gun	Henry Wilson / Bud Rainey	2 episodes
1959	The David Niven Show	Twist Thompson	1 episode
1959	Adventures in Paradise	Jeff Hazen	1 episode
1959–61	Rawhide	Tom Bryan / Dan Fletcher	2 episodes
1960	Westinghouse Desilu Playhouse	Dick	1 episode
1960	The Chevy Mystery Show	Ray	1 episode
1960–67	Bonanza	Vince Dagen / Wade Hollister	2 episodes
1961	The United States Steel Hour		1 episode
1961	Monte Carlo		Unsold pilot
1961–62	Kraft Mystery Theater	Dick	2 episodes
1962	Route 66	David Job	1 episode
1962	Target: The Corruptors!	Grauer	1 episode
1962	The Dick Powell Show	Fitz	1 episode
1963–65	Burke's Law	Gil Harris / Frank Jorek / Sam Bolt	3 episodes
1965	The Fugitive	Lars	1 episode
1965	Profiles in Courage	Calvin Pilleo	1 episode
1965	Vacation Playhouse	Pete	1 episode
1965–66	Honey West	Sam Bolt	30 episodes
1967	The Invaders	Hardy Smith	1 episode
1968–73	The F.B.I.	Sgt. Devlin / Craig Walden	2 episodes
1969	Gunsmoke	Blaine Copperton	1 episode
1969–71	Medical Center	Pete Duncan / Steve Crowley	2 episodes
1970	Ironside	Fred	1 episode
1970	Marcus Welby, M.D.	Peter Barton	1 episode
1971	The Virginian	Jack Bonham	1 episode
1971	Longstreet	Frank Glendon	1 episode
1972	The Bounty Man	Billy Riddle	TV movie
1972	Assignment Vienna	Jonathan	1 episode
1973	Tenafly	Ken Sheperd	1 episode
1973	Escape		1 episode
1974	Hog Wild	Morris Melborne	TV movie
1974	Hawkins	Frank Pearson	1 episode
1974	The Wide World of Mystery	Murray	1 episode
1974	Doc Elliot	Raymond Boardlow	1 episode
1974	The Streets of San Francisco	Shelby	1 episode
1974–75	Police Story	Lieutenant Charlie Parks / Investigator Logan	2 episodes
1975	Barbary Coast	McCord	1 episode
1975	S.W.A.T.	Captain Brenner	2 episodes
1977	Police Woman	Bert Travis	1 episode
1977	The Hardy Boys/Nancy Drew Mysteries	Captain Rogers	1 episode
1978	Vega$	Mr. Smith	1 episode
1978–83	CHiPs	Bob Patterson / Captain Burke	2 episodes
1978–84	Fantasy Island	Policeman / Ellis Lathrop / Gene Collins / Hawkins	4 episodes
1980	The Ghosts of Buxley Hall	George Ross	TV movie
1981	Nero Wolfe	Arthur Poor	1 episode
1982	One Day at a Time	Clint Wilkens	1 episode
1983	Knight Rider	Phillip Royce	1 episode
1983	The A-Team	Calvin Cutter	1 episode
1984	Automan	Woodrow 'Woody' Oster	1 episode
1984	Airwolf	Dr. Karl Krüger	1 episode
1985	Robert Kennedy & His Times	Senator	Miniseries
1985	Murder, She Wrote	Henderson Wheatley	1 episode
1987	General Hospital	Eric Ingstrom	
1989	Hardball		1 episode
2008	Crash	Doctor's Father	1 episode
