= Australian literature =

Australian literature is the written or literary work produced in the area or by the people of the Commonwealth of Australia and its preceding colonies. During its early Western history, Australia was a collection of British colonies; as such, its recognised literary tradition begins with and is linked to the broader tradition of English literature. However, the narrative art of Australian writers has, since 1788, introduced the character of a new continent into literature—exploring such themes as Aboriginality, mateship, egalitarianism, democracy, national identity, migration, Australia's unique location and geography, the complexities of urban living, and "the beauty and the terror" of life in the Australian bush.

== Overview ==
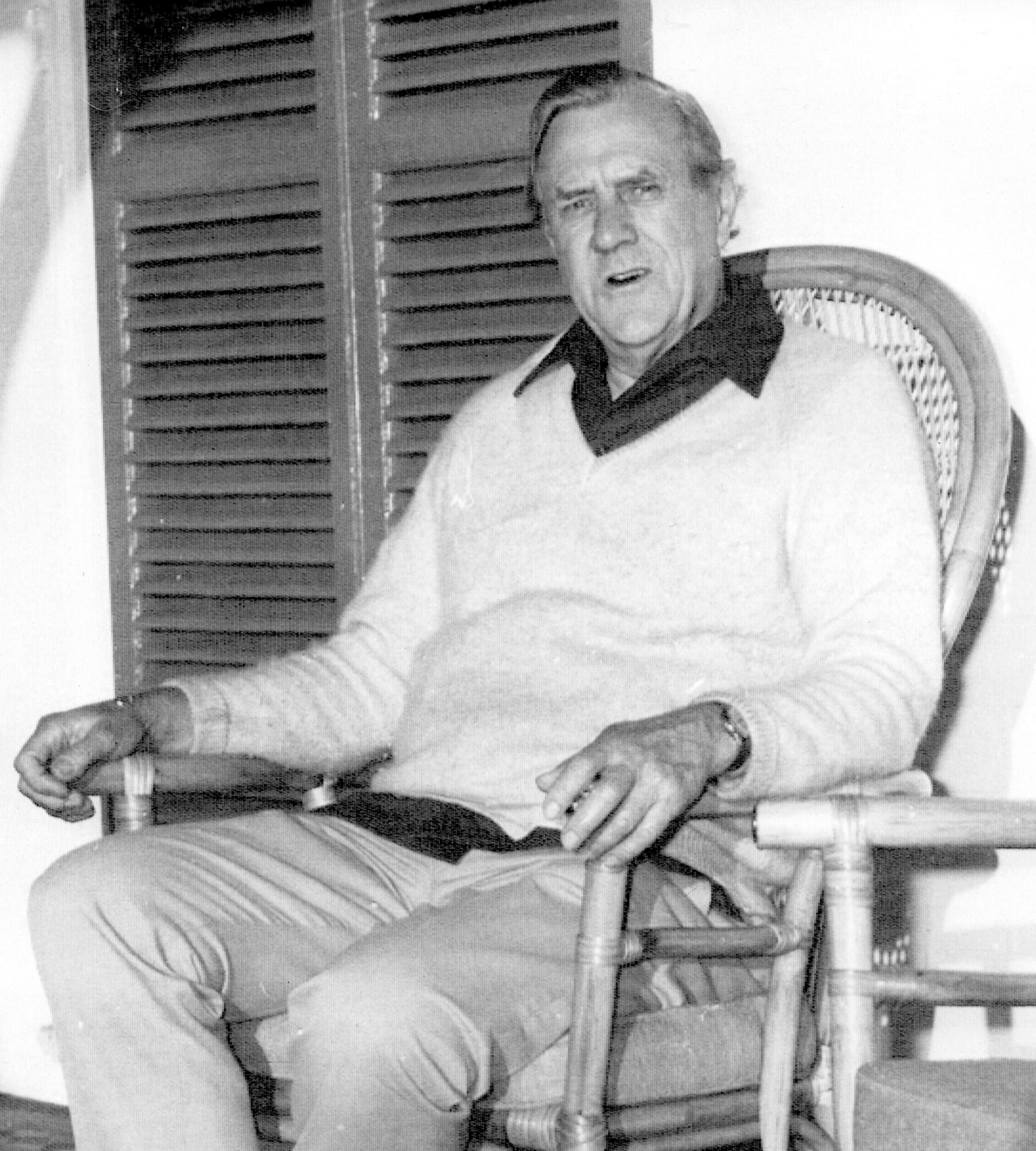
Patrick White became the first Australian to be awarded the Nobel Prize in Literature in 1973.

Australian writers who have obtained international renown include the Nobel-winning author Patrick White, as well as authors Christina Stead, David Malouf, Peter Carey, Thomas Keneally, Joan Lindsay, Colleen McCullough, Nevil Shute and Morris West. Notable contemporary authors include novelists Alexis Wright, Michelle de Kretser and Richard Flanagan.

Among the important authors of classic Australian works are the poets Henry Lawson, Banjo Paterson, C. J. Dennis and Dorothea Mackellar. Dennis wrote in the Australian vernacular, while Mackellar wrote the iconic patriotic poem My Country. Lawson and Paterson clashed in the famous "Bulletin Debate" over the nature of life in Australia with Lawson considered to have the harder edged view of the Bush and Paterson the romantic. Lawson is widely regarded as one of Australia's greatest writers of short stories, while Paterson's poems remain amongst the most popular Australian bush poems. Significant poets of the 20th century included Dame Mary Gilmore, Kenneth Slessor, A. D. Hope, Les Murray and Judith Wright. Among the best known contemporary poets are John Kinsella and Jennifer Maiden, whose poems are often studied in Australian high schools.

Novelists of classic Australian works include Marcus Clarke (For the Term of His Natural Life), Miles Franklin (My Brilliant Career), Henry Handel Richardson (The Fortunes of Richard Mahony), Joseph Furphy (Such Is Life), Rolf Boldrewood (Robbery Under Arms) and Ruth Park (The Harp in the South). In terms of children's literature, Norman Lindsay (The Magic Pudding), Mem Fox (Possum Magic), and May Gibbs (Snugglepot and Cuddlepie) are among the Australian classics, while Melina Marchetta (Looking for Alibrandi) is a modern YA classic. Eminent Australian playwrights have included Ray Lawler, David Williamson, Alan Seymour and Nick Enright. Among prominent short story writers are Steele Rudd, Henry Lawson, Beverley Farmer, Kate Grenville, and Helen Garner.

Although historically only a small proportion of Australia's population have lived outside the major cities, many of Australia's most distinctive stories and legends originate in the outback, in the drovers and squatters and people of the barren, dusty plains.

David Unaipon is known as the first Aboriginal author. Oodgeroo Noonuccal was the first Aboriginal Australian to publish a book of verse. A ground-breaking memoir about the experiences of the Stolen Generations can be found in Sally Morgan's My Place.

Charles Bean, Geoffrey Blainey, Robert Hughes, Manning Clark, Clare Wright, and Marcia Langton are authors of important Australian histories.

== Aboriginal and Torres Strait Islander writers and themes ==
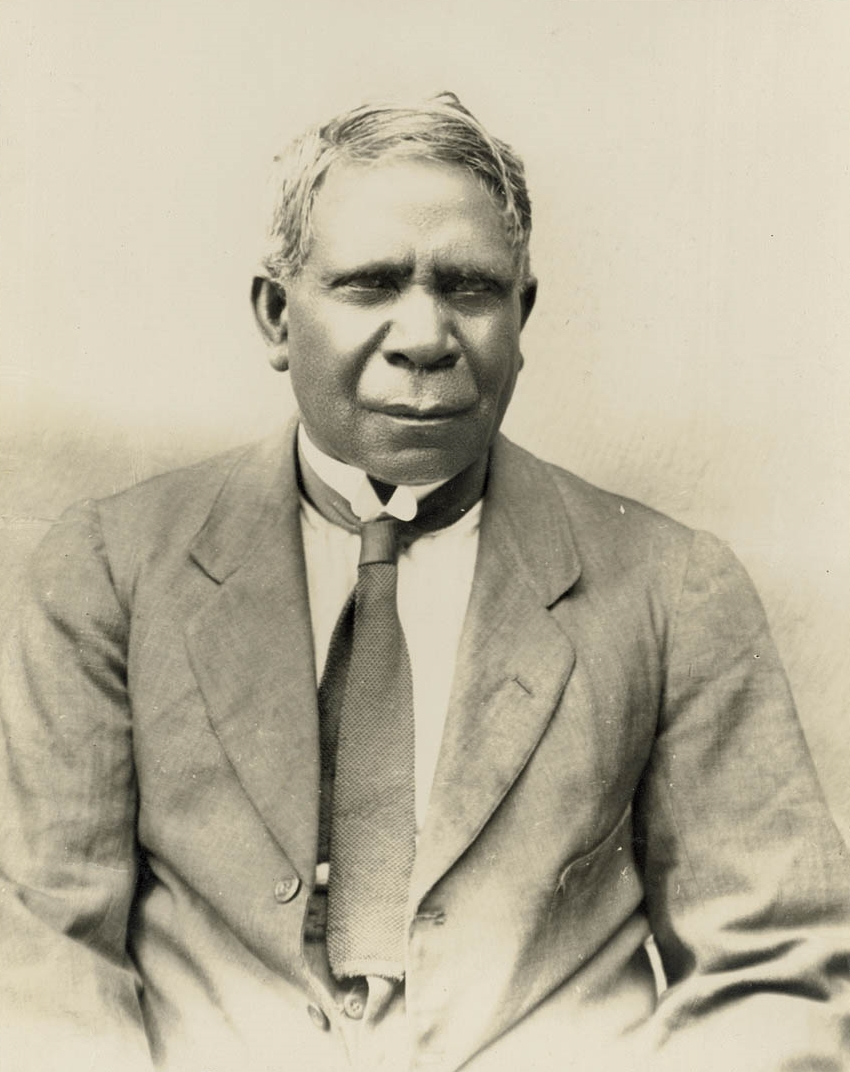
David Unaipon (1872–1967), the first Aboriginal author.

Writing by Aboriginal and Torres Strait Islander people

While his father, James Unaipon (c.1835-1907), contributed to accounts of Aboriginal mythology written by the missionary George Taplin, David Unaipon (1872–1967) provided the first accounts of Aboriginal mythology written by an Aboriginal person: Legendary Tales of the Aborigines. For this he is known as the first Aboriginal author. Oodgeroo Noonuccal (1920–1993) was a famous Aboriginal poet, writer and rights activist credited with publishing the first Aboriginal book of verse: We Are Going (1964). Sally Morgan's novel My Place was considered a breakthrough memoir in terms of bringing indigenous stories to wider notice. Leading Aboriginal activists Marcia Langton (First Australians, 2008) and Noel Pearson (Up from the Mission, 2009) are active contemporary contributors to Australian literature.

The voices of Indigenous Australians are being increasingly recognised and include the playwright Jack Davis and Kevin Gilbert. Writers coming to prominence in the 21st century include Kim Scott, Alexis Wright, Kate Howarth, Tara June Winch, Yvette Holt and Anita Heiss. Indigenous authors who have won Australia's high prestige Miles Franklin Award include Kim Scott who was joint winner (with Thea Astley) in 2000 for Benang and again in 2011 for That Deadman Dance. Alexis Wright won the award in 2007 for her novel Carpentaria. Melissa Lucashenko won the award in 2019 for her novel Too Much Lip, which was also short-listed for the Stella Prize for Australian women's writing.

Letters written by notable Aboriginal leaders like Bennelong and Sir Douglas Nicholls are also retained as treasures of Australian literature, as is the historic Yirrkala bark petitions of 1963 which is the first traditional Aboriginal document recognised by the Australian Parliament. AustLit's BlackWords project provides a comprehensive listing of Aboriginal and Torres Strait Islander Writers and Storytellers.

Writing about Aboriginal and Torres Strait Islander peoples

At the point of the first colonization, Indigenous Australians had not developed a system of writing, so the first literary accounts of Aboriginal people come from the journals of early European explorers, which contain descriptions of first contact, both violent and friendly. Early accounts by Dutch explorers and by the English buccaneer William Dampier wrote of the "natives of New Holland" as being "barbarous savages", but by the time of Captain James Cook and First Fleet marine Watkin Tench (the era of Jean-Jacques Rousseau), accounts of Aborigines were more sympathetic and romantic: "these people may truly be said to be in the pure state of nature, and may appear to some to be the most wretched upon the earth; but in reality they are far happier than ... we Europeans", wrote Cook in his journal on 23 August 1770.

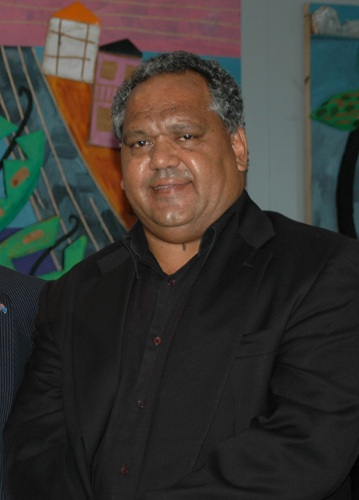
Noel Pearson is an Aboriginal lawyer, rights activist and essayist.

Many notable works have been written by non-indigenous Australians on Aboriginal themes. Examples include the poems of Judith Wright; The Chant of Jimmie Blacksmith by Thomas Keneally, Ilbarana by Donald Stuart, and the short story by David Malouf: "The Only Speaker of his Tongue". Histories covering Indigenous themes include Watkin Tench (Narrative of the Expedition to Botany Bay et Complete Account of the Settlement at Port Jackson); Roderick J. Flanagan (The Aborigines of Australia, 1888); The Native Tribes of Central Australia by Spencer and Gillen, 1899; the diaries of Donald Thomson on the subject of the Yolngu people of Arnhem Land (c.1935-1943); Alan Moorehead (The fatal Impact, 1966); Geoffrey Blainey (Triumph of the Nomads, 1975); Henry Reynolds (The Other Side of the Frontier, 1981); and Marcia Langton (First Australians, 2008). Differing interpretations of Aboriginal history are also the subject of contemporary debate in Australia, notably between the essayists Robert Manne and Keith Windschuttle.

== Early and classic works ==
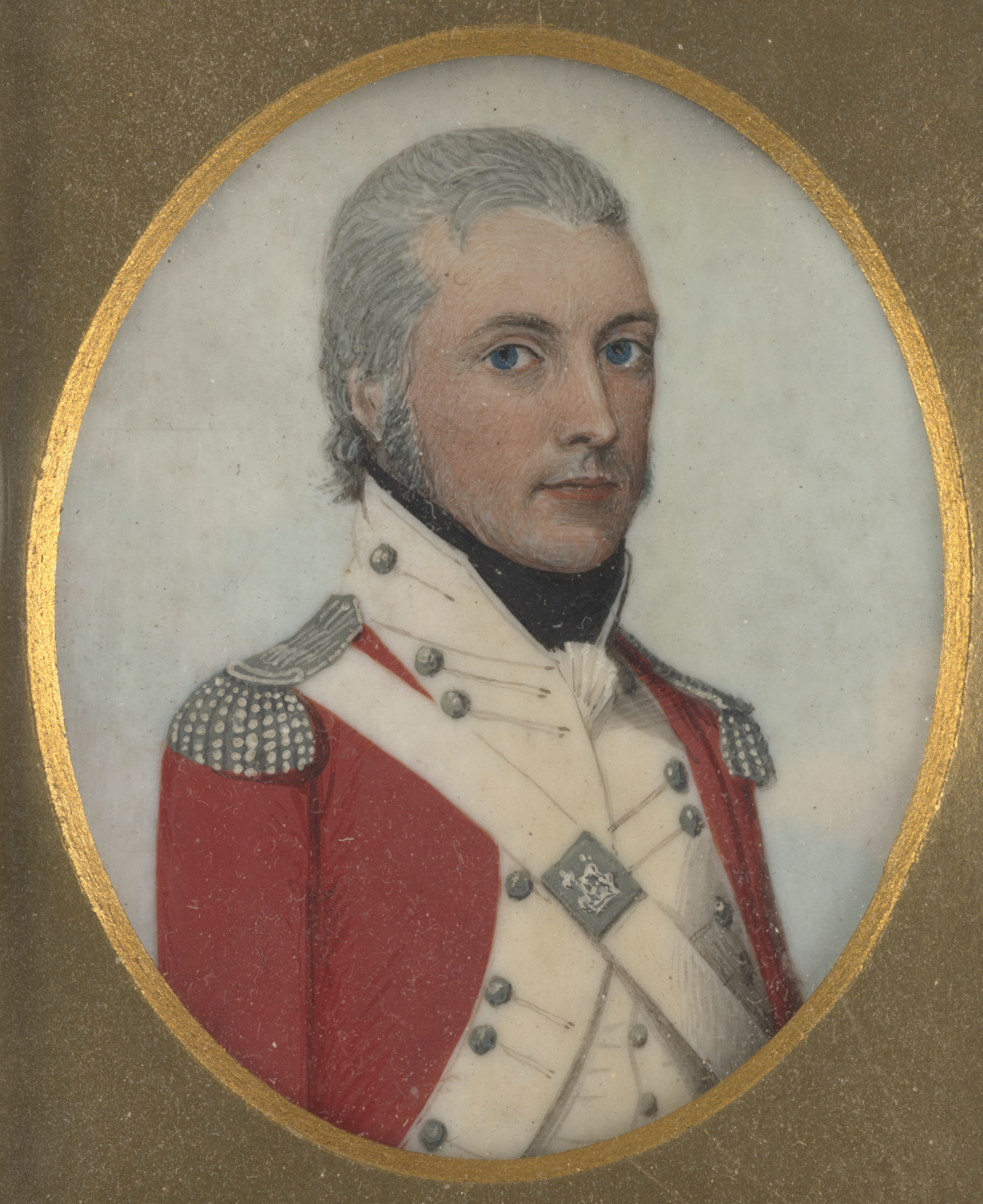
Watkin Tench, an officer of the marines on the First Fleet and author.

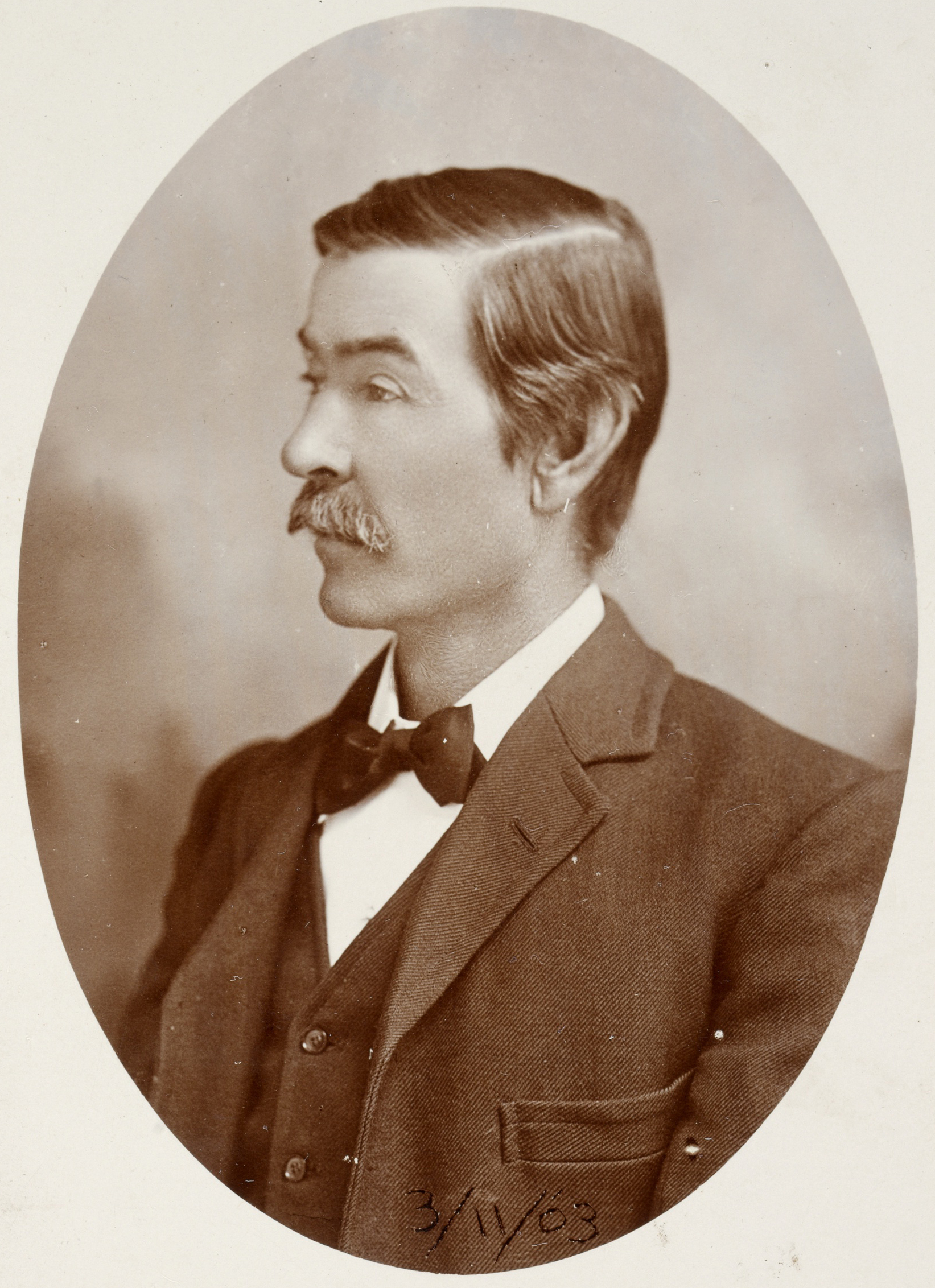
Joseph Furphy (Tom Collins), 1911

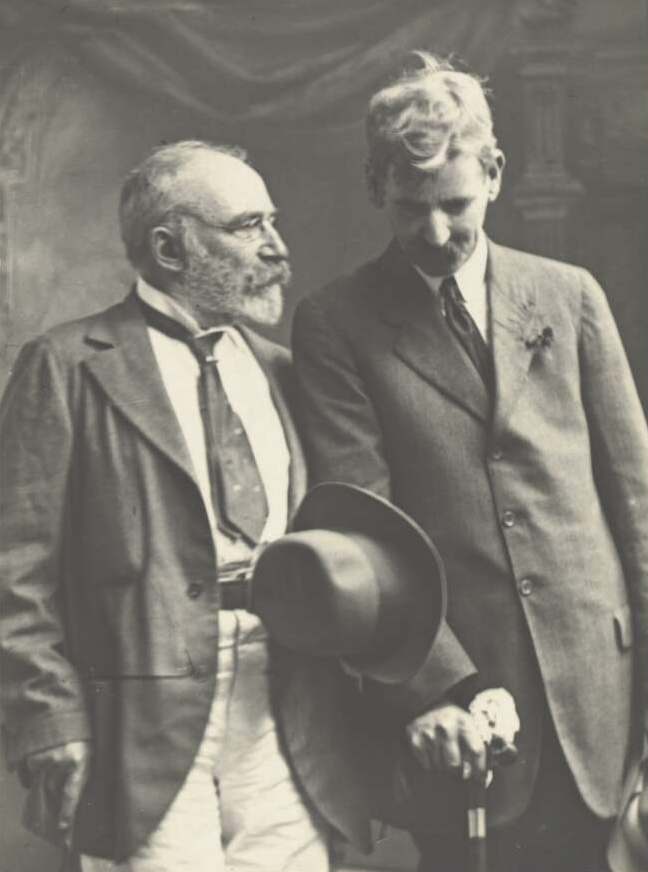
Henry Lawson (right) with J. F. Archibald, the co-founder of The Bulletin

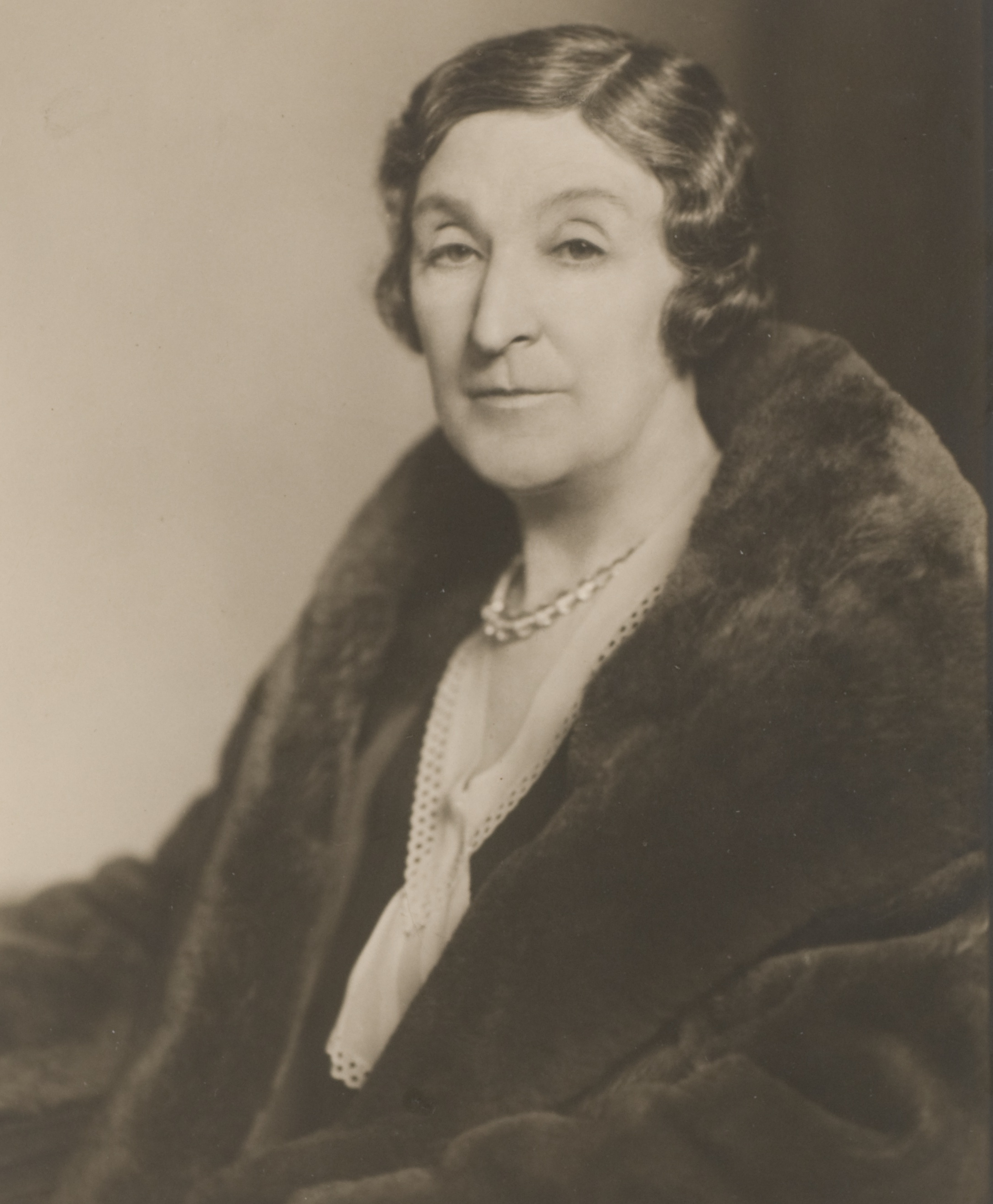
Ethel Florence Richardson ('Henry Handel Richardson'), ca. 1935, Notable women authors sometimes used male pseudonyms.

For centuries before the British settlement of Australia, European writers wrote fictional accounts of an imagining of a Great Southern Land. In 1642 Abel Janszoon Tasman landed in Tasmania and after examining notches cut at considerable distances on tree trunks, speculated that the newly discovered country must be peopled by giants. Later, the British satirist, Jonathan Swift, set the land of the Houyhnhnms of Gulliver's Travels to the west of Tasmania. In 1797 the British Romantic poet Robert Southey—then a young Jacobin—included a section in his collection, "Poems", a selection of poems under the heading, "Botany Bay Eclogues," in which he portrayed the plight and stories of transported convicts in New South Wales.

Among the first true works of literature produced in Australia were the accounts of the settlement of Sydney by Watkin Tench, a captain of the marines on the First Fleet to arrive in 1788. In 1819, poet, explorer, journalist and politician William Charles Wentworth published the first book written by an Australian: A Statistical, Historical, and Political Description of the Colony of New South Wales and Its Dependent Settlements in Van Diemen's Land, With a Particular Enumeration of the Advantages Which These Colonies Offer for Emigration and Their Superiority in Many Respects Over Those Possessed by the United States of America, in which he advocated an elected assembly for New South Wales, trial by jury and settlement of Australia by free emigrants rather than convicts.

The first novel to be published in Australia was a crime novel, Quintus Servinton: A Tale founded upon Incidents of Real Occurrence by Henry Savery published in Hobart in 1830. Early popular works tended to be the 'ripping yarn' variety, telling tales of derring-do against the new frontier of the Australian outback. Writers such as Rolf Boldrewood (Robbery Under Arms), Marcus Clarke (For the Term of His Natural Life), Henry Handel Richardson (The Fortunes of Richard Mahony) and Joseph Furphy (Such Is Life) embodied these stirring ideals in their tales and, particularly the latter, tried to accurately record the vernacular language of the common Australian. These novelists also gave valuable insights into the penal colonies which helped form the country and also the early rural settlements.

In 1838 The Guardian: a tale by Anna Maria Bunn was published in Sydney. It was the first Australian novel printed and published in mainland Australia and the first Australian novel written by a woman. It is a Gothic romance.

Miles Franklin (My Brilliant Career) and Jeannie Gunn (We of the Never Never) wrote of lives of European pioneers in the Australian bush from a female perspective. Albert Facey wrote of the experiences of the Goldfields and of Gallipoli (A Fortunate Life). Ruth Park wrote of the sectarian divisions of life in impoverished 1940s inner city Sydney (The Harp in the South). The experience of Australian PoWs in the Pacific War is recounted by Nevil Shute in A Town Like Alice and in the autobiography of Sir Edward Dunlop. Alan Moorehead was an Australian war correspondent and novelist who gained international acclaim.

A number of notable classic works by international writers deal with Australian subjects, among them D. H. Lawrence's Kangaroo. The journals of Charles Darwin contain the famous naturalist's first impressions of Australia, gained on his tour aboard the Beagle that inspired his writing of On the Origin of Species. The Wayward Tourist: Mark Twain's Adventures in Australia contains the acclaimed American humourist's musings on Australia from his 1895 lecture tour.

In 2012, The Age reported that Text Publishing was releasing an Australian classics series in 2012, to address a "neglect of Australian literature" by universities and "British dominated" publishing houses—citing out of print Miles Franklin Award winners such as David Ireland's The Glass Canoe and Sumner Locke Elliott's Careful, He Might Hear You as key examples.

== Children's literature ==
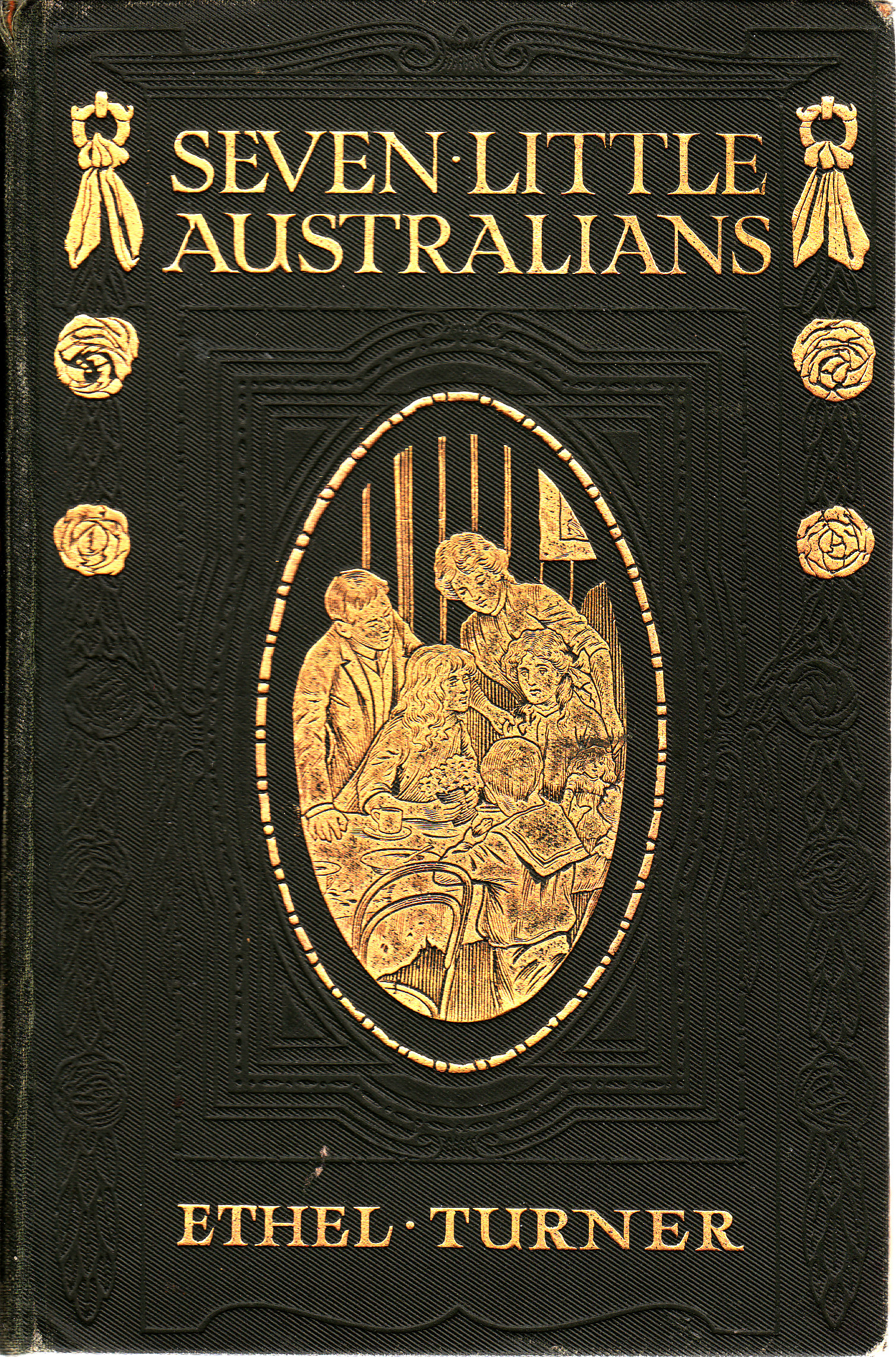
Seven Little Australians by Ethel Turner is the first and only book by an Australian author to have been continuously in print for 100 years.

The Magic Pudding by Norman Lindsay.

Ethel Turner's Seven Little Australians, which relates the adventures of seven mischievous children in Sydney, has been in print since 1894, longer than any other Australian children's novel. The Getting of Wisdom (1910) by Henry Handel Richardson, about an unconventional schoolgirl in Melbourne, has enjoyed a similar success and been praised by H. G. Wells and Germaine Greer.

Other perennial favourites of Australian children's literature include Dorothy Wall's Blinky Bill, Ethel Pedley's Dot and the Kangaroo, May Gibbs' Snugglepot and Cuddlepie, Ted Prior’s Grug, Norman Lindsay's The Magic Pudding, Ruth Park's The Muddleheaded Wombat and Mem Fox's Possum Magic. These classic works employ anthropomorphism to bring alive the creatures of the Australian bush, thus Bunyip Bluegum of The Magic Pudding is a koala who leaves his tree in search of adventure, while in Dot and the Kangaroo a little girl lost in the bush is befriended by a group of marsupials. May Gibbs crafted a story of protagonists modelled on the appearance of young eucalyptus (gum tree) nuts and pitted these gumnut babies, Snugglepot and Cuddlepie, against the antagonist Banksia men. Gibbs' influence has lasted through the generations – contemporary children's author Ursula Dubosarsky has cited Snugglepot and Cuddlepie as one of her favourite books.

In the middle of the twentieth century, children's literature languished, with popular British authors dominating the Australian market. But in the 1960s Oxford University Press published several Australian children's authors, and Angus & Robertson appointed their first specialist children's editor. The best-known writers to emerge in this period were Hesba Brinsmead, Ivan Southall, Colin Thiele, Patricia Wrightson, Nan Chauncy, Joan Phipson and Eleanor Spence, their works primarily set in the Australian landscape. In 1971, Southall won the Carnegie Medal for Josh. In 1986, Patricia Wrightson received the international Hans Christian Andersen Award.

The Children's Book Council of Australia has presented annual awards for books of literary merit since 1946 and has other awards for outstanding contributions to Australian children's literature. Notable winners and shortlisted works have inspired several well-known Australian films from original novels, including the Silver Brumby series, a collection by Elyne Mitchell which recount the life and adventures of Thowra, a Snowy Mountains brumby stallion; Storm Boy (1964), by Colin Thiele, about a boy and his pelican and the relationships he has with his father, the pelican, and an outcast Aboriginal man called Fingerbone; the Sydney-based Victorian era time travel adventure Playing Beatie Bow (1980) by Ruth Park; and, for older children and mature readers, Melina Marchetta's 1993 novel about a Sydney high school girl Looking for Alibrandi. Robin Klein's Came Back to Show You I Could Fly is a story about the beautiful relationship between an eleven-year-old boy and an older, drug-addicted girl.

Jackie French, widely described as Australia's most popular children's author, has written about 170 books, including two CBCA Children's Book of the Year Award winners. One of them, the critically acclaimed Hitler's Daughter (1999), is a "what if?" story that explores mind-provoking issues about what would have happened if Adolf Hitler had had a daughter. French is also the author of the highly praised Diary of a Wombat (2003), which won awards such as the 2003 COOL Award and 2004 BILBY Award, among others. It was also named an honour book for the CBCA Children's Book of the Year Award for picture books.

Paul Jennings is a writer of contemporary Australian fiction for young people whose career began with collections of short stories such as Unreal! (1985) and Unbelievable! (1987); many of the stories were adapted as episodes of the award-winning television show Round the Twist.

The world's richest prize in children's literature has been received by two Australians, Sonya Hartnett, who won the 2008 Astrid Lindgren Memorial Award and Shaun Tan, who won in 2011. Hartnett has a long and distinguished career, publishing her first novel at 15. She is known for her dark and often controversial themes. She has won several awards, including the Kathleen Mitchell Award and the Victorian Premier's Award for Sleeping Dogs, Guardian Children's Fiction Prize and the Aurealis Award, Best Young Adult Novel (Australian speculative fiction) for Thursday's Child and the CBCA Children's Book of the Year Award: Older Readers for Forest. Tan won this for his career contribution to "children's and young adult literature in the broadest sense". Tan has been awarded various literary awards, including the Deutscher Jugendliteraturpreis in 2009 for Tales from Outer Suburbia and a New York Times Best Illustrated Children's Books award in 2007 for The Arrival. Alongside his numerous literary awards, Tan's adaption of his book The Lost Thing also won him an Oscar for best animated short film. Other awards Tan has won include a World Fantasy Award for Best Artist, and a Hugo Award for Best Professional Artist.

== Expatriate authors ==
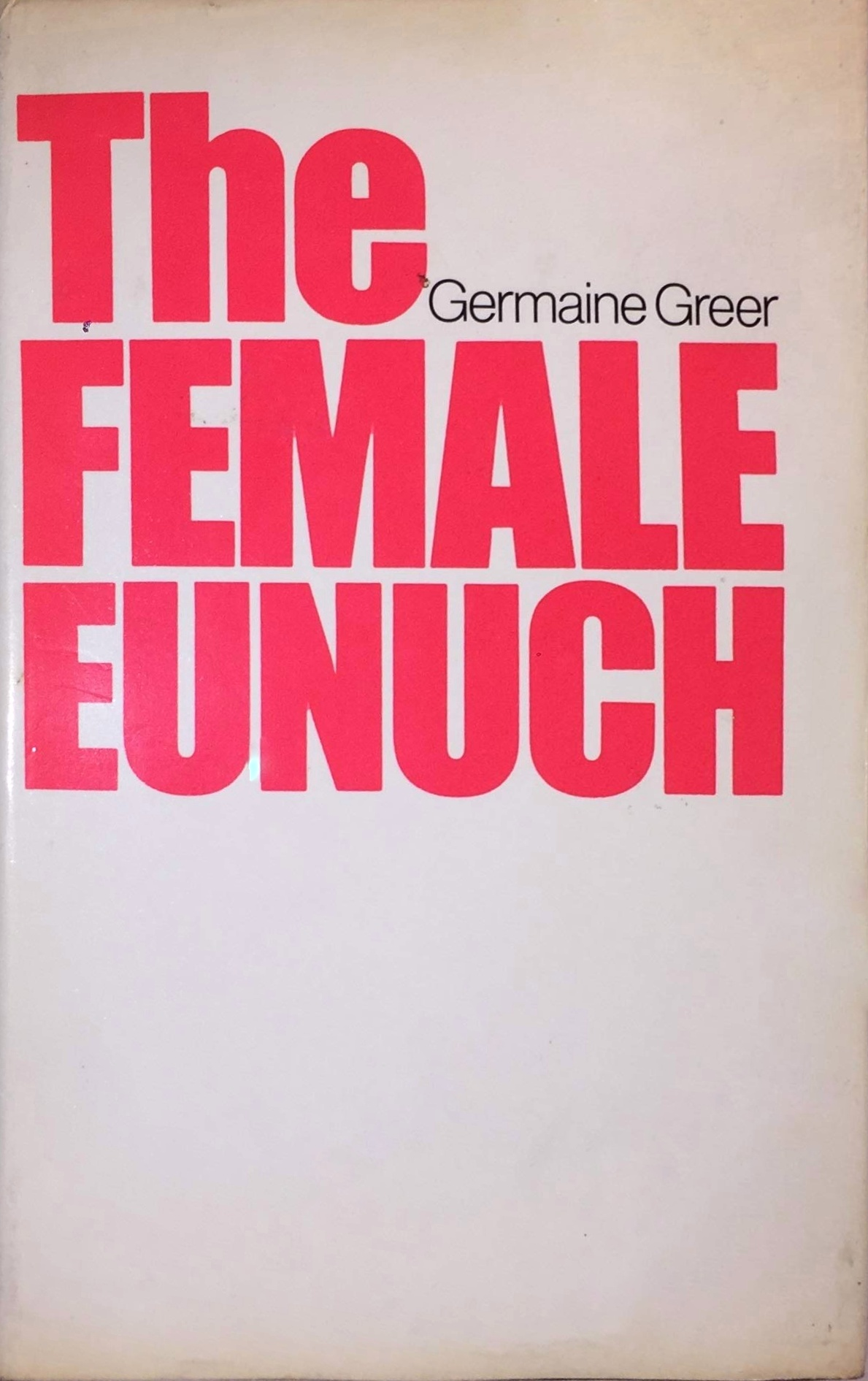
Cover of The Female Eunuch (1970) by Germaine Greer. The book was a bestseller and helped usher in second-wave feminism in Australia and the world. Greer relocated to England for many years, but now divides her time between England and Queensland.

A generation of leading contemporary international writers who left Australia for Britain and the United States in the 1960s have remained regular and passionate contributors of Australian themed literary works throughout their careers including: Clive James, Robert Hughes, Barry Humphries, Geoffrey Robertson and Germaine Greer. Several of these writers had links to the Sydney Push intellectual sub-culture in Sydney from the late 1940s to the early 1970s; and to Oz, a satirical magazine originating in Sydney, and later produced in London (from 1967 to 1973).

After a long media career, Clive James remained a leading humourist and author based in Britain whose memoir series was rich in reflections on Australian society (including his 2007 book Cultural Amnesia). Robert Hughes has produced a number of historical works on Australia (including The Art of Australia (1966) and The Fatal Shore (1987)).

Barry Humphries took his dadaist absurdist theatrical talents and pen to London in the 1960s, becoming an institution on British television and later attaining popularity in the USA. Humphries' outlandish Australian caricatures, including Dame Edna Everage, Barry McKenzie and Les Patterson have starred in books, stage and screen to great acclaim over five decades and his biographer Anne Pender described him in 2010 as the most significant comedian since Charles Chaplin. His own literary works include the Dame Edna biographies My Gorgeous Life (1989) and Handling Edna (2010) and the autobiography My Life As Me: A Memoir (2002). Geoffrey Robertson KC is a leading international human rights lawyer, academic, author and broadcaster whose books include The Justice Game (1998) and Crimes Against Humanity (1999). Leading feminist Germaine Greer, author of The Female Eunuch, has spent much of her career in England but continues to study, critique, condemn and adore her homeland (recent work includes Whitefella Jump Up: The Shortest Way to Nationhood, 2004).

== Other contemporary works and authors ==
Martin Boyd (1893–1972) was a distinguished memoirist, novelist and poet, whose works included social comedies and the serious reflections of a pacifist faced with a time of war. Among his Langton series of novels—The Cardboard Crown (1952), A Difficult Young Man (1955), Outbreak of Love (1957)—earned high praise in Britain and the United States, though despite their Australian themes, were largely ignored in Australia.

Patrick White (1912–1990) became the first Australian to be awarded the Nobel Prize in Literature in 1973 "for an epic and psychological narrative art which has introduced a new continent into literature". White's first novel, Happy Valley (1939) was inspired by the landscape and his work as a jackaroo on the land at Adaminaby in the Snowy Mountains, but became an international success and won the Australian Literary Society's gold medal. Born to a conservative, wealthy Anglo-Australian family, he later wrote of conviction in left-wing causes and lived as a homosexual. Never destined for life on the land, he enrolled at Cambridge where he became a published poet. White developed as a novelist, but also had major theatrical success—including The Season at Sarsaparilla. White followed The Tree of Man with Voss, which became the first winner of the Miles Franklin Award. A subsequent novel, Riders in the Chariot also received a Miles Franklin award—but White later refused to permit his novels to be entered for literary prizes. He turned down a knighthood, and various literary awards—but in 1973 accepted the Nobel prize. David Marr wrote of biography of White in 1991.

J. M. Coetzee, who was born in South Africa and was resident there when awarded the Nobel Prize in Literature in 2003, now lives in Adelaide, South Australia, and is an Australian citizen. Colleen McCullough's The Thorn Birds, 1977, is Australia's highest selling novel and one of the biggest selling novels of all time with around 30 million copies sold by 2009. Thomas Keneally wrote The Chant of Jimmie Blacksmith, 1972 and Schindler's Ark, 1982. This latter work was the inspiration for the film Schindler's List. Other notable Australian novels converted to celluloid include: Paul Brickhill's The Great Escape; Pamela Lyndon Travers' Mary Poppins; Morris West's The Shoes of the Fisherman and Bryce Courtenay's The Power of One.

Careful, He Might Hear You by Sumner Locke Elliott won the Miles Franklin Award in 1963, and was the subject of a 1983 Australian film. Author David Ireland won the Miles Franklin Award three times, including for The Glass Canoe (1976). Peter Carey has also won the Miles Franklin Award three times (Jack Maggs 1998; Oscar and Lucinda 1989; and Bliss 1981). He has twice won the Booker Prize with 1988's Oscar and Lucinda and 2001's True History of the Kelly Gang. DBC Pierre's Vernon God Little won the Booker Prize in 2003. Other notable writers to have emerged since the 1970s include Kate Grenville, David Malouf, Helen Garner, Janette Turner Hospital, Marion Halligan, Susan Johnson, Christopher Koch, Alex Miller, Shirley Hazzard, Richard Flanagan, Gerald Murnane, Brenda Walker, Rod Jones and Tim Winton.

James Clavell in The Asian Saga discusses an important feature of Australian literature: its portrayal of far eastern culture, from the admittedly even further east, but nevertheless western cultural viewpoint, as Nevil Shute did. Clavell was also a successful screenwriter and along with such writers as Thomas Keneally (see above), has expanded the topics of Australian literature far beyond that one country. Other novelists to use international themes are David Malouf, Beverley Farmer and Rod Jones. The Secret River (2005) is an historical fiction by Kate Grenville imagining encounters between Aboriginal and colonial Australia which was shortlisted for the Man Booker Prize. The Slap (2008) was an internationally successful novel by Christos Tsiolkas which was adapted for television by ABC1 in 2011, and was described in a review by Gerard Windsor as "something of an anatomy of the rising Australian middle class".

=== 1991–1996: Grunge lit ===
Justine Ettler's novel The River Ophelia (1995) details the lives of a group of attractive yuppie twenty-year-old Sydneysiders with masochistic, nihilistic and narcissistic tendencies: their days run the gamut of BDSM, sexual hedonism and illicit drug use. The protagonist, university student Justine, is in a destructive relationship with sadist Sade, Ettler's nod to the Marquis de Sade.

Grunge lit (an abbreviation for "grunge literature") is an Australian literary genre usually applied to fictional or semi-autobiographical writing concerned with dissatisfied and disenfranchised young people living in suburban or inner-city surroundings. It was typically written by "new, young authors" who examined "gritty, dirty, real existences", of lower-income young people, whose lives revolve around a nihilistic pursuit of casual sex, recreational drug use and alcohol, which are used to escape boredom or a feeling of meaninglessness about the world. Romantic love is seldom or nonexistent, as instant gratification has become the norm. It has been described as both a sub-set of dirty realism and an offshoot of Generation X literature. The term "grunge" is from the 1990s-era music genre of grunge.

The genre was first coined in 1995 following the success of Andrew McGahan's first novel Praise which had been released in 1991 and became popular with sub-30-year-old readers, a previously under-investigated demographic. Other authors considered to be "grunge lit" include Linda Jaivin, Fiona Kelly McGregor and Justine Ettler. Since its invention, the term "grunge lit" has been retrospectively applied to novels written as early as 1977, namely Helen Garner's Monkey Grip. Grunge lit is often raw, explicit, and vulgar, even to the point of Ettler's The River Ophelia (1995) being called pornographic.

The term "grunge lit" and its use to categorize and market this diverse group of writers and authorial styles has been the subject of debate and criticism. Linda Jaivin disagreed with putting all these authors in one category, Christios Tsiolkas called the term a "media creation", and Murray Waldren denied grunge lit even was a new genre; he said the works actually are a type of the pre-existing dirty realism genre.

=== 1998–2010s: Post-grunge lit ===
Post-grunge lit is a genre of Australian fiction from the late 1990s, 2000s and 2010s. It is called "post-grunge lit" to denote that this genre appeared after the 1990s Australian literary genre known as grunge lit. Michael Robert Christie's 2009 PhD dissertation, "Unbecoming-of-Age: Australian Grunge Fiction, the Bildungsroman and the Long Labor Decade" states that there is a genre called "post Grunge [lit]" which follows the grunge lit period. Christie names three examples of Australian "post-grunge lit": Elliot Perlman's Three Dollars (1998), Andrew McCann's Subtopia (2005) and Anthony Macris' Capital. Christie's dissertation interprets and explains these three post-grunge lit works "as responses to the embedding of Neoliberalism in Australian and global political culture".

Kalinda Ashton (born 1978) has been called a post-grunge writer, in part due to influences from grunge lit author Christos Tsiolkas. Ashton is the author of the novel The Danger Game. Samantha Dagg's 2017 thesis on grunge lit and post-grunge lit states that Luke Carman is a post-grunge writer. Carman's first work, a collection of interlinked semi-autobiographical short stories, explores the authentic experiences of working-class Australians in the suburbs, including issues such as drug addiction and a sense of disillusionment.

== Australian writing in languages other than English ==
Australia has migrant groups from many countries, and members of those communities (not always of the first generation) have produced Australian writing in a variety of languages. These include Italian, Greek, Arabic, Chinese, Vietnamese, Lao, Filipino, Latvian, Ukrainian, Polish, Russian, Serbian, Yiddish and Irish.

Comparatively little attention has been devoted to such writing by mainstream critics. It has been argued that, in relation to the national literary landscape, such literary communities have a quite separate existence, with their own poetry festivals, literary competitions, magazine and newspaper reviews and features, and even local publishers. Some writers, like the Greek Australian Dimitris Tsaloumas, have published bilingually. There are now signs that such writing is attracting more academic interest. Some older works in languages other than English have been translated and received critical and historical attention long after their first publication; for example, the first Chinese-language novel to be published in Australia (and possibly the West), The Poison of Polygamy (1909–10) by Wong Shee Ping, was published in English for the first time in 2019, in a bilingual parallel edition.

== Histories ==
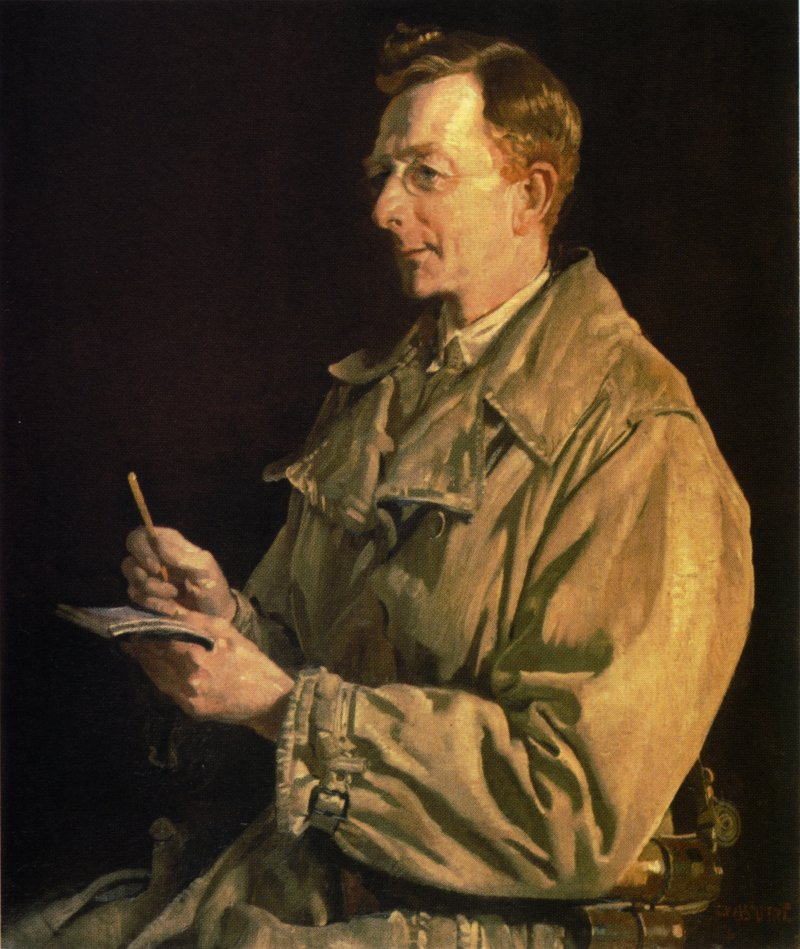
Portrait of Charles Bean, official World War I historian

History has been an important discipline in the development of Australian writing. Watkin Tench (1758–1833) - a British officer who arrived with the First Fleet in 1788 - later published two books on the subject of the foundations of New South Wales: Narrative of the Expedition to Botany Bay and Complete Account of the Settlement at Port Jackson. Written with a spirit of humanity his accounts are considered by writers including Robert Hughes and Thomas Keneally to be essential reading for the early history of Australia. Charles Bean was the official war historian of the First World War and was influential in establishing the importance of ANZAC in Australian history and mythology, with such prose as "Anzac stood, and still stands, for reckless valor in a good cause, for enterprise, resourcefulness, fidelity, comradeship and endurance, that will never own defeat". (see works including The Story of ANZAC: From the Outbreak of War to the End of the First Phase of the Gallipoli Campaign 4 May 1915, 1921).

Australia in the War of 1939–1945 is a 22-volume official history dedicated to Australia's Second World War efforts. the series was published by the Australian War Memorial between 1952 and 1977. The main editor was Gavin Long. A significant milestone was the historian Manning Clark's six-volume History of Australia, which is regarded by some as the definitive account of the nation. Clark had a talent for narrative prose and the work (published between 1969 and 1987) remains a popular and influential work. Clark's one time student Geoffrey Blainey stands as another to have deeply influenced Australian historiography. His important works include The Tyranny of Distance (1966) and Triumph of the Nomads: A History of Ancient Australia (1975). Robert Hughes' much-debated history The Fatal Shore: The epic of Australia's founding (1987) is a popular and influential work on early Australian history. Marcia Langton is one of the principal contemporary Indigenous Australian academics and her 2008 collaboration with Rachel Perkins chronicles Australian history from an Indigenous perspective: First Australians. An Illustrated History.

== Writing and identity ==
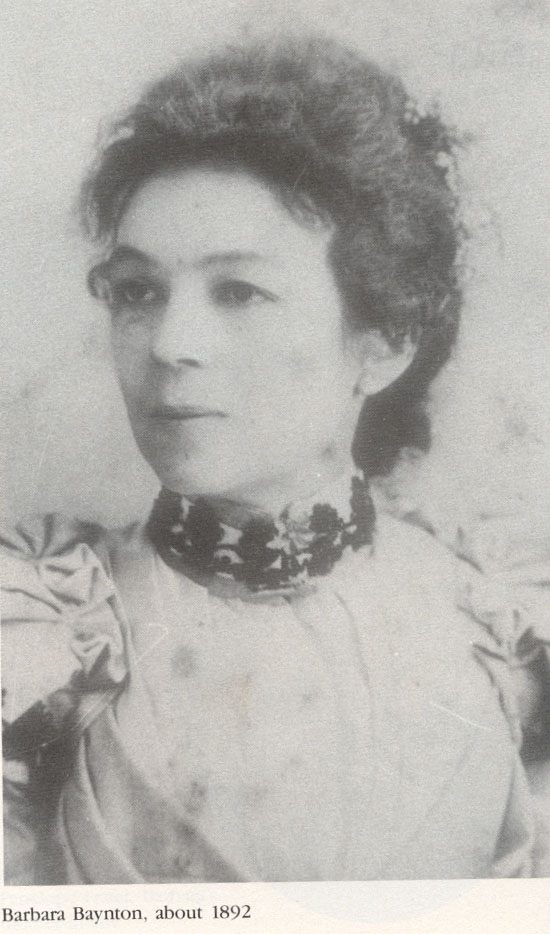
Barbara Baynton.

A complicated, multi-faceted relationship to Australia is displayed in much Australian writing, often through writing about landscape. Barbara Baynton's short stories from the late 19th century/early 20th century convey people living in the bush, a landscape that is alive but also threatening and alienating. Kenneth Cook's Wake in Fright (1961) portrayed the outback as a nightmare with a blazing sun, from which there is no escape. Colin Thiele's novels reflected the life and times of rural and regional Australians in the 20th century, showing aspects of Australian life unknown to many city dwellers.

In Australian literature, the term mateship has often been employed to denote an intensely loyal relationship of shared experience, mutual respect and unconditional assistance existing between friends (mates) in Australia. This relationship of (often male) loyalty has remained a central subject of Australian literature from colonial times to the present day. In 1847, Alexander Harris wrote of habits of mutual helpfulness between mates arising in the "otherwise solitary bush" in which men would often "stand by one another through thick and thin; in fact it is a universal feeling that a man ought to be able to trust his own mate in anything". Henry Lawson, a son of the Goldfields wrote extensively of an egalitarian mateship, in such works as A Sketch of Mateship and Shearers, in which he wrote:

They tramp in mateship side by side -
The Protestant and Roman
They call no biped lord or sir
And touch their hat to no man.

Miles Franklin is one Australian author who has been recognised as one of the defining voices to shaping the Australian Literature identity. Franklin was brought up in colonial New South Wales, a rural bush setting which defined her authorial voice. Franklins' personal friend, Marjori Barnard, recalls Franklins' connection to the bush as "Miles wonder book," and a landscape where she "feared nothing." Fellow Australian author Henry Lawson, warmly regarded the authenticity and impact of the Australian identity Franklin captures in her writing:

"...I saw that the work was Australian – born of the bush...the descriptions of bush life and scenery came startling, painfully real to me, and I know as far as they are concerned, the book is true to Australia – the truest I ever read..."

Thus, many have regarded the important of Franklins work in refining the Australian writing identity. Miles Franklin herself defined the style herself in this quote:

"By Australian literature I mean that which most truly expresses native thought, character and aspirations, naturally, from the inside...it is from this kind of writing that a nation gains highest honour; it defines national personality."

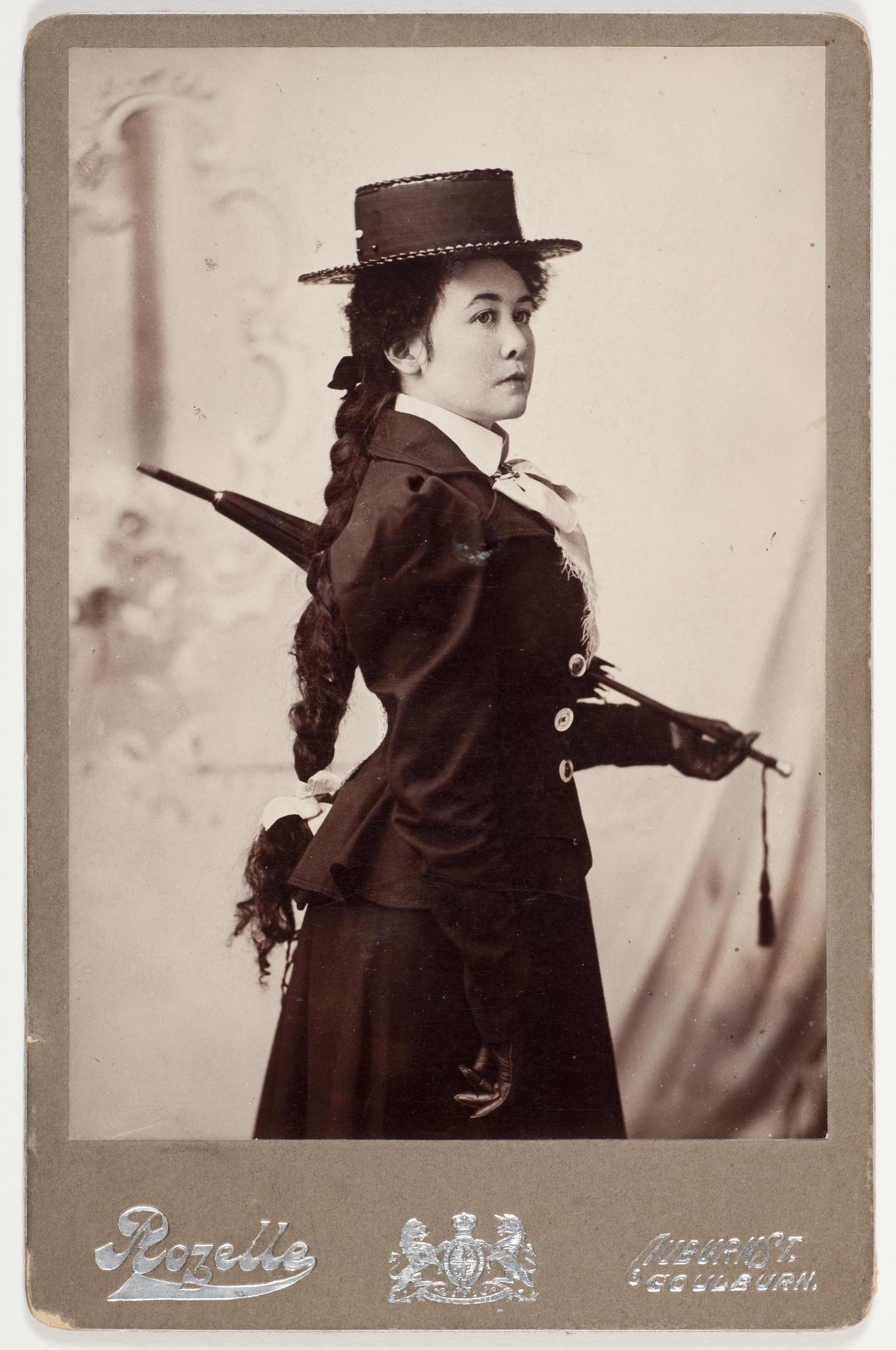
Miles Franklin, author of My Brilliant Career, in 1901

What it means to be Australian is another issue that Australian literature explores. Miles Franklin struggled to find a place for herself as a female writer in Australia, fictionalising this experience in My Brilliant Career (1901). Marie Bjelke Petersen's popular romance novels, published between 1917 and 1937, offered a fresh upbeat interpretation of the Australian bush. The central character in Patrick White's The Twyborn Affair tries to conform to expectations of pre–World War II Australian masculinity but cannot, and instead, post-war, tries out another identity—and gender—overseas. Peter Carey has toyed with the idea of a national Australian identity as a series of 'beautiful lies', and this is a recurrent theme in his novels. Andrew McGahan's Praise (1992), Christos Tsiolkas's Loaded (1995), Justine Ettler's The River Ophelia (1995) and Brendan Cowell's How It Feels (2010) introduced a grunge lit, a type of 'gritty realism' take on questions of Australian identity in the 1990s, though an important precursor to such work came some years earlier with Helen Garner's Monkey Grip (1977), about a single mother living on and off with a male heroin addict in Melbourne share housing.

Australian literature has had several scandals surrounding the identity of writers. In the 1930s, a misunderstanding with a printer caused Maud Hepplestone's bush poetry collection "Songs of the Kookaburra" (64 blank pages) to be mistakenly lauded internationally as a modernist masterpiece. The 1944 Ern Malley affair led to an obscenity trial and is often blamed for the lack of modernist poetry in Australia. To mark the 60th anniversary of the Ern Malley affair, another Australian writer, Leon Carmen, set out to make a point about the prejudice of Australian publishers against white Australians. Unable to find publication as a white Australian he was an instant success using the false Aboriginal identity of "Wanda Koolmatrie" with My Own Sweet Time. In the 1980s Sreten Božić also managed to become published by assuming the Aboriginal identity of B. Wongar. In the 1990s, Helen Darville used the pen-name "Helen Demidenko" and won major literary prizes for her Hand that Signed the Paper before being discovered, sparking a controversy over the content of her novel, a fictionalised and highly tendentious account of the Nazi occupation of Ukraine. Mudrooroo—previously known as Colin Johnson—was acclaimed as an Aboriginal writer until his Aboriginality came under question (his mother was Irish/English and his father was Irish/African-American, however he has strong connections with Aboriginal tribes); he now avoids adopting a specific ethnic identity and his works deconstruct such notions.

== Poetry ==
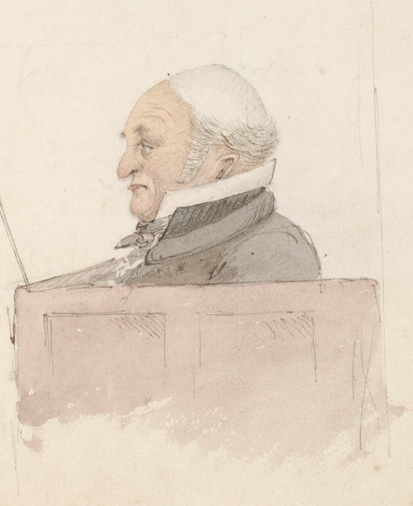
Australia's first published poet Michael Massey Robinson in a watercolour by Edward Charles Close c1817. State Library of New South Wales

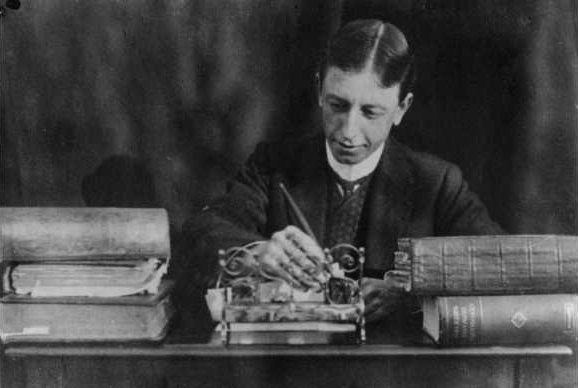
C.J. Dennis, poet and humourist of the Australian vernacular.

Poetry played an important part in early Australian literature. The first poet to be published in Australia was Michael Massey Robinson (1744–1826), convict and public servant, whose odes appeared in The Sydney Gazette. The first book of verse by a native-born Australian poet, Australasia, was published by explorer and author William Charles Wentworth in 1823, espousing his ideals of Australian identity. Charles Harpur and Henry Kendall were the first poets of any consequence.

Henry Lawson, son of a Norwegian sailor born in 1867, was widely recognised as Australia's poet of the people and, in 1922, became the first Australian writer to be honoured with a state funeral. Two poets who are amongst the great Australian poets are Christopher Brennan and Adam Lindsay Gordon; Gordon was once referred to as the "national poet of Australia" and is the only Australian with a monument in Poets' Corner of Westminster Abbey in England. Both Gordon's and Brennan's (but particularly Brennan's) works conformed to traditional styles of poetry, with many classical allusions, and therefore fell within the domain of high culture.

However, at the same time Australia had a competing, vibrant tradition of folk songs and ballads. Henry Lawson and Banjo Paterson were two of the chief exponents of these popular ballads, and 'Banjo' himself was responsible for creating what is probably the most famous Australian verse, "Waltzing Matilda". At one point, Lawson and Paterson contributed a series of verses to The Bulletin magazine in which they engaged in a literary debate about the nature of life in Australia. Lawson said Paterson was a romantic and Paterson said Lawson was full of doom and gloom. Lawson is widely regarded as one of Australia's greatest writers of short stories, while Paterson's poems "The Man From Snowy River" and "Clancy of the Overflow" remain amongst the most popular Australian bush poems. Romanticised views of the outback and the rugged characters that inhabited it played an important part in shaping the Australian nation's psyche, just as the cowboys of the American Old West and the gauchos of the Argentine pampa became part of the self-image of those nations.

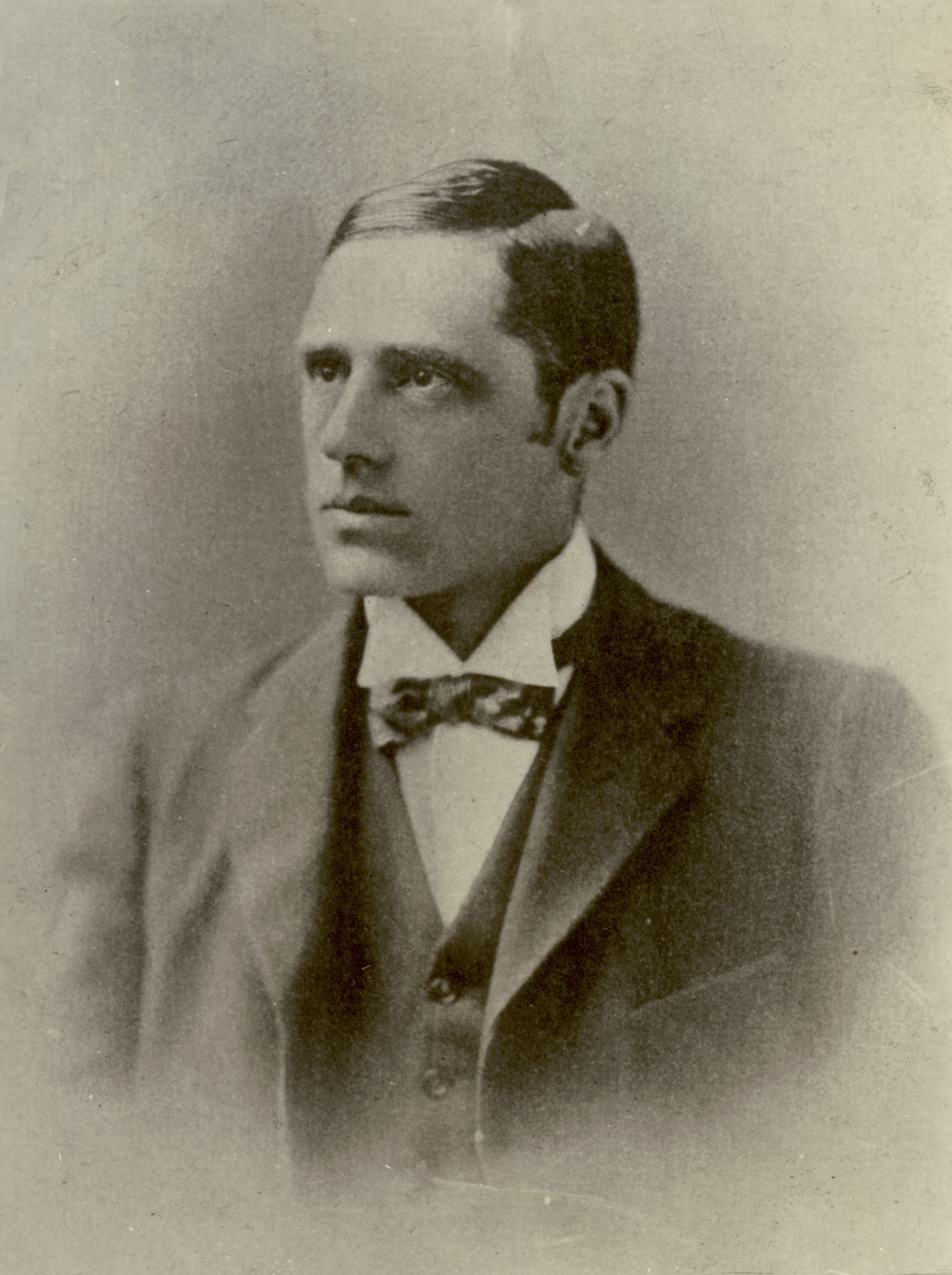
The bush balladeer Banjo Paterson.

Other poets who reflected a sense of Australian identity include C J Dennis and Dorothea McKellar. Dennis wrote in the Australian vernacular ("The Songs of a Sentimental Bloke"), while McKellar wrote the iconic patriotic poem "My Country". Prominent Australian poets of the 20th century include Dame Mary Gilmore, A. D. Hope, Judith Wright, Gwen Harwood, Kenneth Slessor, Les Murray, Bruce Dawe and more recently Robert Gray, Jennifer Maiden, John Forbes, Chris Mansell, Les Wicks, John Tranter, John Kinsella, Richard James Allen, and Judith Beveridge.

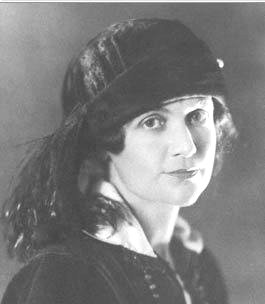
Dorothea Mackellar (1885–1968), writer of My Country.

From the 1970s performance poetry flourished and a nationwide body called the Poets Union was the principal source of literary activity of its time.

Contemporary Australian poetry is mostly published by small, independent book publishers. However, other kinds of publication, including new media and online journals, spoken word and live events, and public poetry projects are gaining a presence. 1992–1999 saw poetry and art collaborations in Sydney and Newcastle buses and ferries, including Artransit from Meuse Press. This was a mass poetry outreach program for Sydney and Newcastle. Some contributions to Australian poetry have emerged from artist-run galleries in recent years, such as Textbase which had its beginnings as part of the 1st Floor gallery in Fitzroy. In addition, Red Room Company is an exponent of poetry projects. Bankstown Poetry Slam has become a venue for spoken-word poetry and for community intersection with poetry as an art form to be shared. With its roots in Western Sydney it has a following from first and second generation Australians, often giving a platform to voices from groups that are more marginalised in mainstream Australian society.

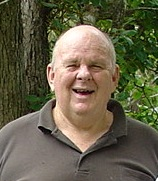
Les Murray.

The Australian Poetry Library was an online resource that contained a wide range of Australian poetry as well as critical and contextual material relating to it, such as interviews, photographs and audio/visual recordings. Begun in 2004 by leading Australian poet John Tranter, it was a joint initiative of the University of Sydney and the Copyright Agency Limited (CAL) with funding by the Australian Research Council. By 2018 it contained over 42,000 poems, from more than 170 Australian poets. As of 2025, the Australian Poetry Library is "currently unavailable".

== Plays ==
European traditions came to Australia with the First Fleet in 1788, with the first production being performed in 1789 by convicts : The Recruiting Officer by George Farquhar. Two centuries later, the extraordinary circumstances of the foundations of Australian theatre were recounted in Our Country's Good by Timberlake Wertenbaker: the participants were prisoners watched by sadistic guards and the leading lady was under threat of the death penalty. The play is based on Thomas Keneally's novel The Playmaker. After Australian Federation in 1901, plays evidenced a new sense of national identity. On Our Selection (1912) by Steele Rudd, told of the adventures of a pioneer farming family and became immensely popular. In 1955, Summer of the Seventeenth Doll by Ray Lawler portrayed resolutely Australian characters and went on to international acclaim. A new wave of Australian theatre debuted in the 1970s with the works of writers including David Williamson, Barry Oakley and Jack Hibberd. The Belvoir St Theatre presented works by Nick Enright and David Williamson. Williamson is Australia's best known playwright, with major works including: The Club, Emerald City, and Brilliant Lies.

In The One Day of the Year, Alan Seymour studied the paradoxical nature of the ANZAC Day commemoration by Australians of the defeat of the Battle of Gallipoli. Ngapartji Ngapartji, by Scott Rankin and Trevor Jamieson, recounts the story of the effects on the Pitjantjatjara people of nuclear testing in the Western Desert during the Cold War. It is an example of the contemporary fusion of traditions of drama in Australia with Pitjantjatjara actors being supported by a multicultural cast of Greek, Afghan, Japanese and New Zealand heritage. Eminent contemporary Australian playwrights include David Williamson, Alan Seymour, Stephen Sewell, the late Nick Enright and Justin Fleming. The Australian government supports a website (australianplays.org The Home of Australian Playscripts | AustralianPlays.org) that aims to combine playwright biographies and script information. Scripts are also available there.

== Science fiction and fantasy ==
Australia, unlike Europe, does not have a long history in the genre of science fiction. However it does have a massive contribution. With the 1892 novel, The Germ Growers, the earliest known alien invasion story. By Robert Potter.

An English citizen and resident of Australia, Nevil Shute wrote the science fiction novel On the Beach which was published in 1957 and first adapted into a motion picture in 1959. Various compilation magazines began appearing in the 1960s. In 2013 a trilogy by Sydney-born Ben Peek was sold at auction to a UK publisher for a six-figure deal.

== Crime ==
The crime fiction genre is currently thriving in Australia, most notably through books written by Kerry Greenwood, Shane Maloney, Peter Temple, Barry Maitland, Arthur Upfield and Peter Corris, among others.

High-profile, highly publicised court cases and murders have seen a significant amount of non-fiction crime literature, perhaps the most recognisable writer in this field being Helen Garner. Garner's published accounts of three court cases: The First Stone, about a sexual harassment scandal at the University of Melbourne, Joe Cinque's Consolation, about a young man murdered by his girlfriend in Canberra, and This House of Grief, about Victorian child-killer Robert Farquharson. Each of Garner's works incorporates the style reminiscent of a fictional narrative novel, a stylistic device known as the non-fiction novel.

Chloe Hooper published The Tall Man: Death and Life on Palm Island in 2008 as a response to the death of an Aboriginal man, Cameron Doomadgee, in police custody in Palm Island, Queensland.

== Literary journals ==
The first periodical that could be called a literary journal in Australia was The Australian Magazine (June 1821 - May 1822). It featured poetry, a two-part story and articles on theology and general topics. Most of the others that followed in the 19th century were based in either Sydney or Melbourne. Few lasted long due to difficulties that included a lack of capital, the small local market and competition from literary journals from Britain.

Most recent Australian literary journals have originated from universities, and specifically English or Communications departments. They include:

- Meanjin
- Overland
- HEAT
- Southerly
- Westerly

Other journals include:

- Quadrant
- Australian Book Review
- Island
- Voiceworks
- Wet Ink (now closed)
- The Lifted Brow
- Red Leaves / 紅葉
- Kill Your Darlings

A number of newspapers also carry literary review supplements:

- Australian Literary Review

== Awards ==
Current literary awards in Australia include:

- Anne Elder Award
- The Australian/Vogel Literary Award
- Children's Book Council of Australia
- Ditmar Award Science Fiction (includes Fantasy & Horror)
- Kenneth Slessor Prize for Poetry
- Mary Gilmore Prize for a first book of poetry
- Miles Franklin Award
- New South Wales Premier's Literary Awards
- Patrick White Award
- Peter Blazey Fellowship
- Prime Minister's Literary Awards
- Queensland Premier's Literary Awards
- Stella Prize
- Victorian Premier's Literary Award
- Western Australian Premier's Book Awards

Australian authors are also eligible for a number of other literary awards, such as the:

- Booker Prize
- Commonwealth Writers' Prize
- Women's Prize for Fiction

== See also ==
- AustLit: The Australian Literature Resource
- Australian film
- Australian outback literature of the 20th century
- Australian performance poetry
- List of Australian novelists
- List of Australian poets
- List of years in Australian literature
- Tasmanian literature
  - Tasmanian Gothic
- Indigenous Australian literature
- Category:Jewish Australian writers
