= Ted Prior =

Ted Prior may refer to:

- Ted Prior (actor) (born 1959), actor, writer and producer for some television series
- Ted Prior (writer), writer of Australian children's series of Grug books

== See also ==
- Edward Prior (disambiguation)
