= Nyiyaparli language =

Australian Aboriginal language

Nyiyaparli
- "Nijadali"
- Native to: Western Australia
- Ethnicity: Bailgu, Niabali
- Native speakers: 8 (2025)
- Language family: Pama–Nyungan: Ngayarda; Nyiyaparli
- Dialects: Palyku; Nankilakuthu ('high' or padupadu dialect); Martuyitha ('low' dialect); ?Ngulipartu (self-reported)

Language codes
- ISO 639-3: xny
- Glottolog: nija1241
- AIATSIS: A50
- ELP: Palyku; Nyiyaparli

Nyiyaparli (Nyiyabali, Njijabali, or misspelled Nijadali) is a nearly extinct Pama–Nyungan language spoken by the Palyku (Bailko) and Niabali (Jana) people of Western Australia. There is also a formal language register known as padupadu.

== Phonology ==
=== Consonants ===
	Labial	Alveolar	Retroflex	(Alveolo-) palatal	Velar
Plosive	p	t	ʈ ⟨rt⟩	c ⟨j⟩	k
Nasal	m	n	ɳ ⟨rn⟩	ɲ ⟨ny⟩	ŋ ⟨ng⟩
Rhotic		ɾ ⟨rr⟩			
Approximant		ɹ ⟨r⟩		j ⟨y⟩	w
Lateral		l	ɭ ⟨rl⟩	lʲ ⟨ly⟩	

- /ɲ, c, l̠ʲ/ can also be heard as dental [n̪, t̪, l̪] in free variation among speakers, with a possible phonemic distinction.
- Rhotics /ɾ, ɹ/ can be heard in free variation as [r, ɻ] among speakers.

=== Vowels ===
	Front	Central	Back
High	i		u
Low		ɐ ⟨a⟩	

- /i, u// can be heard as [ɪ, ʊ] within diphthongs.
