= Helen Milroy =

Australian psychiatrist

Helen Milroy AM
- Born: Perth, Western Australia
- Education: University of Western Australia
- Occupations: Psychiatrist; Academic; Commissioner; Children's author
- Employer: Western Australian Department of Health
- Known for: First Indigenous Australian medical doctor
- Relatives: Sally Morgan (sister); Jill Milroy (sister)
- Awards: Sigmund Freud Award (2011); Australian Indigenous Doctor of the Year (2018); Western Australian of the Year (2021); Member of the Order of Australia (2023)

Helen Milroy AM is an Australian psychiatrist and academic. She is recognised as the first Indigenous Australian to become a medical doctor, and as of September 2026 is Perth Children's Hospital foundation professor of child and adolescent psychiatry. She is also a writer of children's books and an artist.

== Early life and education ==
Helen Milroy was born in Perth, and traces her ancestral lineage to the Palyku people of the Pilbara region of Western Australia. Her sisters are artist and author Sally Morgan and Jill Milroy.

Her grandmother, Daisy, was an Aboriginal healer, and inspired her to pursue a career in medicine.

Milroy studied medicine at the University of Western Australia, qualifying as Australia's first Indigenous medical doctor in 1983.

== Career ==
Milroy undertook a training programme in child and adolescent psychiatry, before becoming a senior registrar. She was then employed in a number of health facilities in Perth, including:

- Community Child & Adolescent Mental Health Clinic - Bentley Health Service (Bentley, Western Australia)
- Mother and Infant Services - King Edward Memorial Hospital for Women
- General Clinic - Princess Margaret Hospital for Children (PMH)

She was later appointed as professor of child and adolescent psychiatry.

She has been consultant psychiatrist with the Western Australia Department of Health, specialising in child and adolescent psychiatry, and director of the Western Australian Centre for Aboriginal Medical and Dental Health.

As of September 2026 Milroy is Perth Children's Hospital foundation professor of child and adolescent psychiatry.

== Other activities and roles ==
Milroy is also an artist. Her painting The Dance of Life, which "presents a multi-dimensional model of health and wellbeing from an Aboriginal perspective", is held by the National Museum of Australia.

From 2010 until 2012, she was a consultant psychiatrist to government and industry. From 2013 until 2017, Milroy was a consultant to the Australian Government's Royal Commission into Institutional Responses to Child Sexual Abuse.

In 2018, Milroy was appointed as the first Indigenous commissioner to the Australian Football League.

From 2019 until 2024, she served as a consultant on the Government of Western Australia's Mental Health Tribunal. Since 2019 and as of September 2026 she has been a consultant to Embrace @ Telethon Kids; chair of Gayaa Dhuwi (Proud Spirit) Australia; and director on the board of Transforming Indigenous Mental Health & Wellbeing. From February 2024 she has been a member of the Council for the Order of Australia.

In November 2024, Milroy gave the keynote address at the annual conference of the Royal Australian College of General Practitioners, in which she spoke about the need to integrate Indigenous cultural practices into Western medicine.

== Recognition and awards ==
- 2011: Sigmund Freud Award by the World Congress of Psychiatry, in recognition for her contributions as an Indigenous health professional
- 2018: Australian Indigenous Doctor of the Year Award, by the Australian Indigenous Doctors Association (AIDA)
- 2018: Australian Mental Health Prize
- 2021: Western Australian of the Year
- 2021: Winner, Whitley Award in the Young Children's Reader category, for Backyard Birds
- 2021: Finalist, Human Rights Medal
- 2022: Momentum Most Inspiring Woman of the Year Award, by Momentum for Australia
- 2023: Member of the Order of Australia in the 2023 Australia Day Honours
- 2025: Vice-Chancellor's Indigenous-led Research Award
- 2026: DANZ Children's Book Award for Sunny & Shadow, in the Chapter Book category

== Selected works ==
- Wombat, Mudlark and Other Stories (Fremantle Press, 2019) – 2020 Western Australian Premier's Book Award (shortlisted)
- Backyard Birds (Fremantle Press, 2020)
- Tales from the Bush Mob (Magabala Books, 2020)
- Willy-Willy Wagtail: Tales from the Bush Mob (Magabala Books, 2020)
- Backyard Bugs (Fremantle Press, 2021)
- The Emu Who Ran Through the Sky (Magabala Books, 2021)
- Backyard Beasties (Fremantle Press, 2022)
- The Sweetest Egg of All (Magabala Books, 2022)
- Owl and Star (Fremantle Press, 2022)
- Bush Mob Counting (Magabala Books, 2022)
- Bush Birds (Fremantle Press, 2023)
- The Cockatoo Wars (Magabala Books, 2023)
- Cloudmaker (Magabala Books, 2025)
- Sunny & Shadow (Fremantle Press, 2026)
