= Jill Milroy =

Australian Aboriginal academic

- Born: Pilbara, Western Australia
- Awards: AM

Jillian Debora Milroy, AM is an Australian Aboriginal academic specialising in traditional forms of knowledge, including storytelling. She is of Palyku descent. Of her siblings, Sally Morgan is an author and artist, Helen Milroy is a child psychiatrist who was the first indigenous Australian to become a medical doctor, David is a playwright, and William has worked as a senior public servant.

She was dean and Winthrop Professor at the University of Western Australia (UWA) School of Indigenous Studies and was its founding head. She was made a Member of the Order of Australia in 2011. Milroy is currently Pro Vice Chancellor Indigenous Education at UWA and Director of UWA's Poche Centre for Indigenous Health.

== Selected works ==
- Wordal, 2001
- Dingo's tree, 2011
- Native title claims in Canada and Australia : Delgamuukw and Miriuwung Gajerrong, 1999
- Gnyung Waart Kooling Kulark - released : going home, 2003
