= My Place (book) =

1987 Indigenous Australian autobiography by Sally Morgan

- First edition
- Author: Sally Morgan
- Language: English
- Subject: Australian Aborigines, History of Indigenous Australians
- Publisher: Fremantle Arts Centre
- Publication date: 1987
- Publication place: Australia
- Media type: Paperback
- Pages: 444
- ISBN: 978-0-949206-31-2
- OCLC: 18120323

My Place is an autobiography by artist Sally Morgan, published in 1987. It is about Morgan's quest for knowledge of her family's past and the fact that she has grown up under false pretences. The book is considered a milestone in Aboriginal literature and is one of the earlier works in indigenous writing in Australia. It was shortlisted for the 1987 New South Wales Premier’s Literary Award, and won the 1987 Human Rights Award for Literature as well as the 1990 Order of Australia Book Prize.

The book has also been published in several parts "for young readers":

- Sally's Story (Fremantle: Fremantle Arts Centre Press, 1990.) edited by Barbara Ker Wilson ('My Place' for young readers, part 1'. For children.) ISBN 0-949206-78-4
- Arthur Corunna's Story (Narkaling Productions, 1995) edited by Barbara Ker Wilson ('My Place' for young readers, part 2'. For children.) ISBN 0-949206-77-6
- Mother and daughter: The story of Daisy and Gladys Corunna (Narkaling Productions, 1994) Edited by Barbara Ker Wilson ('My Place' for young readers, part 3'. For children.) ISBN 0-949206-79-2

The book has been widely studied in schools across Australia.

== Synopsis ==
My Place is the autobiographical account of Sally Morgan’s discovery of her family’s Indigenous roots, which were hidden from her during her childhood. The book revolves around Morgan's own hometown, Perth, Western Australia, and also Corunna Downs Station, managed by Alfred Howden Drake-Brockman. It covers Morgan's life growing up, and the challenges faced by her and her four siblings, It also recounts how in 1982, Morgan travelled back to her grandmother’s birthplace, and how a tentative search for information about her family turned into an overwhelming emotional and spiritual pilgrimage.

The book includes accounts of the life of several of Morgan's family members, and becomes an account of a search for truth into which her whole family is gradually drawn, finally freeing the tongues of the author’s mother and grandmother, allowing them to tell their own stories.

== Critical opinions on Aboriginal representations in My Place ==
=== Bain Attwood, Jackie Huggins ===
In her essay "Always was always will be," Indigenous writer, activist and historian Jackie Huggins responds to Australian historian Bain Attwood's "deconstruction of Aboriginality" in his analysis of Sally Morgan's My Place, in addition to identifying problems that Huggins has with the book itself. Huggins writes:

"It cannot be denied that among those who have read My Place are (usually patronising) whites who believe that they are no longer racist because they have read it. It makes Aboriginality intelligible to non-Aboriginals, although there are different forms of Aboriginality which need to be considered also; otherwise these remain exclusionary and the danger is that only one ‘world view’ is espoused.

"Precisely what irks me about My Place is its proposition that Aboriginality can be understood by all non-Aboriginals. Aboriginality is not like that. [Bain] Attwood states ‘like most other Aboriginal life histories, it requires little if any translation’. To me that is My Place’s greatest weakness – requiring little translation (to a white audience), therefore it reeks of whitewashing in the ultimate sense."

(This quote of Bain's, in Huggins' essay, is in reference to the fact that My Place is written in English rather than an Aboriginal language, and Bain believes this illegitimizes its status as a reputable Aboriginal text.)

However, Huggins also rejects Attwood for defining the aboriginality of others:

Foremostly, I detest the imposition that anyone who is non-Aboriginal [such as Attwood] can define my aboriginality for me and my race. Neither do I accept any definition of aboriginality by non-Aboriginals as it insults my intelligence, spirit and soul, and negates my heritage.

=== Hirokazu Sonoda ===
In response to Attwood's opinions on My Place being written in English, Japanese lecturer Hirokazu Sonoda responded in his essay 'A Preliminary Study of Sally Morgan’s My Place':

Both Attwood and Huggins display negative attitudes towards Sally's use of English to build her aboriginality. [...] Here, various questions arise. Why is English unsuitable to describe Aboriginality? To what extent does the language prevent the accurate description of Aboriginal ways, if any? How do white editors corrupt the authenticity of Aboriginal stories? Are there any examples which prove this? These questions still remain unanswered.

=== Marcia Langton ===
In her essay Aboriginal Art and Film: The Politics of Representation, leading Aboriginal scholar Marcia Langton reflects on the (often complex) debates and controversies that surround Morgan's My Place – which have also plagued authors Mudrooroo and Archie Weller – and Aboriginal identity generally.

"[T]he enormous response by white Australia to [My Place] lies somewhere in the attraction to something forbidden... and the apparent investigation and revelation of that forbidden thing through style and family history. It recasts Aboriginality, so long suppressed, as acceptable, bringing it out into the open. The book is a catharsis. It gives release and relief, not so much to Aboriginal people oppressed by psychotic racism, as to the whites who wittingly and unwittingly participated in it" (Langton)

== Dispute about veracity ==
The claims made in this book are disputed by Judith Drake-Brockman, daughter of Alfred Howden Drake-Brockman. Judith's version of events is detailed in her book "Wongi Wongi." In 2004, she requested that Sally Jane Morgan undergo a DNA test to prove her claims that Howden fathered Morgan's Aboriginal grandmother Daisy, then committed incest with Daisy and fathered Gladys – Sally Morgan's mother.
