= Edward Prior =

Edward Prior may refer to:

- Edward Gawler Prior (1853–1920), Canadian politician
- Edward Schroeder Prior (1857–1932), art professor at Cambridge University

== See also ==
- Ted Prior (disambiguation)
