= Peter Tahourdin =

Australian composer

Peter Richard Tahourdin (27 August 1928 – 28 July 2009) was an English-born Australian composer. His compositions range from orchestral (5 symphonies) and chamber music to choral and educational music, as well as music for the opera and ballet. Without being his principal contribution, he was one of the pioneers in the field of electronic music.

== Early life and career ==
Peter Tahourdin was born in Bramdean, Hampshire in 1928. He was the second child, and only son, of Major Victor Tahourdin and Veronica Price.

Tahourdin went to Wellington College, and then in 1949 began his music studies at Trinity College of Music in London with Richard Arnell. He graduated in 1952 as a trumpet player and in the following years worked as a performer and broadcaster in England, the Netherlands and Canada.

In 1956, he married writer and editor Barbara Ker Wilson.

== Move to Australia, and later life and career ==
With his wife and two daughters, Tahourdin migrated to Australia in 1964. He was appointed visiting composer to the University of Adelaide, on the recommendation of the chief conductor of the then South Australian Symphony Orchestra, Henry Krips, who had conducted his 2nd Sinfonietta. In 1965 he was commissioned by the Australian Ballet to compose the score for Garth Welch's ballet Illyria (1965), which was produced at the 1966 Adelaide Festival.

In 1966 he spent a year studying a master's degree in electronic music at the University of Toronto in Canada. On returning to Adelaide he became active as a composer, lecturer and broadcaster, and he established the first practical course in electronic music in Australia at the University of Adelaide in 1969. His students there included Martin Wesley-Smith.

He joined the Faculty of Music at the University of Melbourne in 1973, and this formed the base for the rest of his working life here. He was chairman of the Composers' Guild of Australia 1978–79.

Having divorced his first wife, he married Jane Todner in 1978.

He retired from the University of Melbourne in 1988 at the age of 60 to work full-time as a composer.

In 2003, Andrew Ford wrote the duo for flute and clarinet Sounds and sweet airs as a tribute to Tahourdin on his 75th birthday.

Peter Tahourdin died on 28 July 2009, aged 80. He was survived by both wives, two daughters and two grandchildren.

== Musical style and interests ==
Tahourdin had wide musical interests including "chamber music, the orchestra, Indian music and music theatre", but his dominant interest for most of his career was electronic music. He developed a pioneering electronic studio, and began his friendship with another English-born Australian composer, Tristram Cary.

== Music ==
=== Operas ===
- Inside Information (1955, one-act)
- Parrot Pie (1973, one-act opera for children)
- Heloise and Abelard (1991, chamber opera; first performed at the 1993 Perth International Arts Festival; first European production at Festival International Albert Roussel in French Flanders, 2000)
- The Tempest (2000, based on Shakespeare's play but not yet staged).

=== Orchestral works ===
Peter Tahourdin wrote two sinfoniettas (1952, 1959); and five symphonies (1960, 1969, 1979, 1987, 1994), all of which except the fifth have been performed. The fifth was inspired by the genocide in Rwanda and the continuing military conflict in Cambodia. The Concerto for Clarinet and Chamber Orchestra was written in 2007. His Elegy for string orchestra and percussion, subtitled "A lament for a world that might have been", was written in 2005.

=== Chamber music ===
Tahourdin's chamber music includes the Clarinet Sonata (1962), the four Dialogues (1971–84), the Quartet for Strings (1982), the Raga Music series (1985–88), Music for Solo Viola (2001), and Look at the Stars for flutes, clarinet, cello and marimba (2006). There are also solo works for piano, violin, cello and bassoon.

=== Vocal music ===
His vocal music includes The Starlight Night (Gerard Manley Hopkins), Songs of Love and Fortune (1992, a setting of five poems from the Carmina Burana)., as well as two cycles written for the tenor Damien Top : Chansons intimes (7 poems by Andrée Brunin for voice and harpsichord) and The Ern Malley Sequence (tenor & piano) (2007)

=== Electronic music ===
His electronic music includes Three Mobiles (1974), San Diego Canons (1983), Ern Malley – A Dramatic Testament (1976), and the Ern Malley Sequence (2007).

== Sources ==
- Australian Music Centre
- Australian Music Centre: Peter Tahourdin at 80
- MusicWeb International
