= Niabali =

Indigenous tribe in Pilbara, Western Australia

The Niabali, otherwise written Nyiyaparli, are an indigenous Australia tribe of the Pilbara region of Western Australia.

== Language ==
Their language is called Nyiyaparli. It was customary to classify it as one of the Ngayarda languages until Alan Dench reassigned it to the Wati languages in a 1991 study.

== Country ==
The Niabali's range of territory extends over some 5,700 square miles (15,000 km^{2}) from the headwaters of the Oakover and Davis rivers, just north of their junction. They include the middle sector of the Fortescue River. To the northwest, they reach as far as Roy Hill on Weeli Wolli Creek, north of the Ophthalmia Range. Eastwards their boundaries run to Talawana.

== Social organization ==
The Niabali have traditionally had strong tribal bonds with the Bailgu, and one result of the disaggregation and dispersion of the old territorial-tribal orders is that the two distinct groups began to intermarry, forming a more mixed set of communities.

== History ==
Towards the end of the 19th. century - Norman Tindale speaks of the early 1890s - the Kartudjara's expansion forced the Niabali to withdraw from north of Savoiry Creek to the confine at the headwaters of Jigalong Creek.

== Alternative names ==
- Njiabali.
- Njijabali.
- Nyiyaparli.
- Iabali.
- Janari. (inlanders/newcomers, an exonym used by tribes to their west)
- Jana.

== Sources ==
- "AIATSIS map of Indigenous Australia". AIATSIS.
- "Tindale Tribal Boundaries" (PDF). Department of Aboriginal Affairs, Western Australia. September 2016. Archived from the original (PDF) on 8 March 2016.
- Sharp, Janet; Thieberger, Nicholas (1992). Bilybara: The Aboriginal Languages of the Pilbara Region of Western Australia. Wangka Maya Pilbara Aboriginal Language Centre. ISBN 978-0-646-10711-0.
- Tindale, Norman Barnett (1974). "Niabali (WA)". Aboriginal Tribes of Australia: Their Terrain, Environmental Controls, Distribution, Limits, and Proper Names. Australian National University. ISBN 978-0-708-10741-6. Archived from the original on 20 March 2020.
