= The River Ophelia =

1995 novel by Justine Ettler

- First edition. The author distanced herself from this cover art, saying it "misrepresented" the book as an "uncompromising" love story, when it was actually about domestic violence.
- Author: Justine Ettler
- Language: English
- Genre: Fiction, modern relationships
- Publisher: Picador Australia
- Publication date: 1995
- Publication place: Australia
- Media type: paperback
- Pages: 387
- ISBN: 9-780330356-70-1

The River Ophelia is an Australian novel by Justine Ettler first published by Picador in 1995. The story moves between first-person narrative to an unnamed observer. It was highly controversial in Australia upon its publication, with some prominent critics dismissing it as pornographic, though Ettler herself has strongly denied this.

Since its initial publication, critics and scholars have read deeper meaning into the novel's plot and style, with some determining it as a post-modernism novel about domestic violence, nihilism in urban environments and toxic relationships, with absurdist or surreal features. The book was shortlisted for the 1995 Aurealis Awards for Excellence in Australian Speculative Fiction - Horror Division - Best Novel.

The first edition cover published by Picador in 1995 features the tagline "an uncompromising love story" underneath the title, and while the novel does explore a no strings attached sexual relationship, Ettler has been adamant in stating that the novel was not about love (rather the misguided pursuit of it) nor was it intended to be erotic or romantic. A reprinting in 2018 features a new cover image, implying the darker nature of the novel.

== Plot synopsis ==
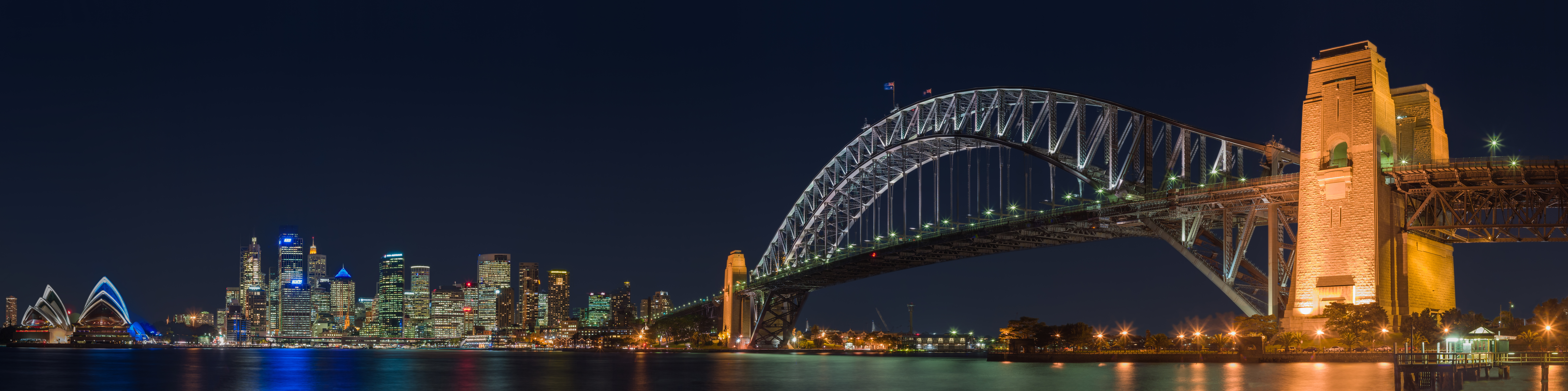
The River Ophelia is set in Sydney, though the name is never mentioned.

The novel concerns the pursuits of the protagonist Justine, a university student in inner-city Sydney, and her relationship with the destructive, abusive narcissist Sade, a well-paid journalist for a trashy rock magazine. The violent, depraved sociopathic Sade regularly uses Justine for his own sexual exploits, and as she recognises this, goes on her own destructive pursuit for sexual fulfilment. Other characters, such as Hamlet, Ophelia, Simone and Marcelle appear later in the story. They regularly consume hard drugs, and are absorbed in a heavy capitalist culture with fluid, occasionally sexually violent open relationships. The only character who ostensibly seems to pursue love, or a healthy monogamous relationship, is Justine. Sade regularly taunts Justine in a sadistic fashion, and sometimes parades his other women around in front of her. The sex is often clinical and kinky, rather than romantic or passionate.

As a response she often lashes out and engages in her own sadistic behaviour in an attempt to mimic or seek revenge on the sordid behaviour of her adversaries because she cannot seem to overcome them. Acting against the grain, slowly giving up on the pursuit of healthy love in an urban environment that rejects healthy love, Justine despairs and delves into hard drug use before eventually seeking a more permanent solution to her woes and oppressions.

== Publication and themes ==
I kept telling everybody The River Ophelia wasn't about sex, (or "the sex" wasn't about sex), it was about power. Not many people listened or heard, though. Only some readers.

— Justine Ettler

Ettler's novel was published in 1995 by Picador. The cover features a naked woman, sprawled over a chair, with her head hanging between her knees. Ettler has been outspoken in her issue with this depiction: "To me the whole question of Justine's sexuality isn’t the central issue. Her sexual behaviour is a symptom masking what’s really going on at a deeper level, which is to do with power. If there is an issue in the novel to do with sex it's about sex addiction – which, incidentally, is on the rise due to the digital revolution, so The River Ophelia is more relevant than ever as more women are placed in the unhappy situation faced by Justine as the girlfriend of a sex addict. The whole nude cover thing irritated me from the start. It’s misleading. I had no control over the cover". When the novel was re-published in 2018, it was given a new front cover that is more true to the violent, sexually depraved nature of the novel.

The novel makes overt references to Brett Easton Ellis's American Psycho (1991), a work of similar tone and parody about empty consumerist culture and the emotionally absent sex lives of yuppies in Manhattan, much as The River Ophelia is about wealthy Sydneysiders with empty, drug-addled lives that are “successful” only at a surface level. Some scholars have called The River Ophelia a feminist text.

== Critical reception and legacy ==
The River Ophelia received a divisive response from Australian critics. It was reviewed in various prominent Australian newspapers, such as The Sydney Morning Herald, The Age and The Australian. Some praised it for its sardonic and satirical approach to the morally impoverished lives of privileged young white university students and yuppies in Sydney's upper-class suburbs, while others dismissed it as being too obscene, violent and sexually explicit. Critic Don Anderson called the novel a "marriage between Helen Garner and the Marquis de Sade".

Some critics have identified the novel as an example of grunge lit, a series of unrelated but thematically equal Australian novels dealing with disenfranchised and alienated urban life.

Ettler relocated to London in 1997 to escape the fallout caused by the novel in Australia. She returned to Sydney in the 2000s, and in 2018 addressed The River Ophelia's impact: "I can finally set the record straight – The River Ophelia is a postmodern novel about domestic violence. I can also acknowledge the scholarship which has defended it". She used the #MeToo movement and increasing awareness of sadomasochism and sexual abuse in mainstream media as encouraging signs that attention towards sexual mistreatment is finally being recognised publicly.

=== Legacy ===
The novel was a best-seller in both Australia and New Zealand. The cover of the first edition was printed and stuck on poles in inner-city Sydney and Melbourne in 1995, while Ettler herself did numerous publicity, including morning talk shows and television as well as radio interviews. In the 1990s, The River Ophelia was added to the Higher School Certificate reading list in the Australian secondary education system.

== See also ==
- Australian literature
- Domestic violence
- BDSM in culture and media
- Hamlet
- Justine
- Juliette
- American Psycho
