= Justine Ettler =

Australian author

- Born: 1965 (age 60–61); Sydney

Justine Ettler (born 1965) is an Australian author who is best known for her 1995 novel, The River Ophelia, which was shortlisted for the 1995 Aurealis Awards for Excellence in Australian Speculative Fiction - Horror Division - Best Novel. She is a seminal figure in Australian "grunge fiction" or "dirty realism" literature of the mid-1990s and was labelled 'The Empress of Grunge'. Her second published novel is Marilyn's Almost Terminal New York Adventure (1996) but technically it is her first novel as she wrote Marilyn's Almost Terminal New York Adventure novel before she wrote The River Ophelia. She has also worked as a literary reviewer for newspapers such as The Observer, The Sydney Morning Herald, a teacher, and academic.

The River Ophelia caught the public's attention due to its striking cover of a nude woman in black and white photography and the marketing of the book was widely discussed in literary circles. All of the major Australian newspapers like The Australian, The Sydney Morning Herald, and The Age featured prominent reviews and Ettler herself soon became 'news' and she appeared on television and was even interviewed by popular magazines like Who Weekly. Over 50,000 copies of the novel were sold in a market where 5,000 is considered a best-seller.

The novel has also attracted significant scholarly attention with the novel now recognised as a significant "grunge" text (although that term and that genre are contested) and a notable example of a feminist text featuring erotic (some would say 'pornographic') content and this has been widely debated in literary circles with particular reference to the concept of abject bodies and abjection. Ettler herself describes the novel as a 'postmodern parody' rather than 'grunge'.

In October 2017, Ettler re-released The River Ophelia in e-book format with an Author's Note and an Introduction analyzing the original reception of the novel.

In April 2018, Ettler had a new novel published in May 2018 named Bohemia Beach (Transit Lounge, 2018).

== Early life and education ==
Etter was born in Sydney to parents with Czech roots who worked in the hospitality industry. She grew up in Woollahra, New South Wales. Her mother and father operated a restaurant on Bondi Road, which they sold to the parents of Julia Zemiro in 1971. Ettler attended Woollahra Demonstration School, now known as Woollahra Public School, and the selective Sydney Girls High School in Moore Park, where classmates included fellow writer Hilary Bell, daughter of Bell Shakespeare founder John Bell. She was surrounded by artists and writers, commenting: "I sometimes think maybe if I had grown up in another part of Sydney and hadn’t been surrounded by that culture I wouldn’t have become a writer".

She graduated from Sydney University of Technology (now University of Technology, Sydney) and she has a BA, MA, and PhD in literary studies from the Department of English, University of Sydney. Her PhD examined the Bret Easton Ellis novel, American Psycho (1991).

== Published works ==
- The River Ophelia (Sydney: Picador, 1995)
- Marilyn's Almost Terminal New York Adventure (Sydney: Picador, 1996)
- Bohemia Beach (Sydney: Transit Lounge, 2018)

== Bibliography ==
- Anderson, Don. ‘Salo in Darlo’. Australian Book Review. 172. July 1995: 50.
- Bennett, Marjory. ‘The Grungy Australian Novel.’ Sydney Morning Herald 24 September 1995.
- Costigan, Michaela. ‘Queering The River Ophelia (The River Ophelia: Four Views). Hecate 21.2 (Oct 1995): 69-
- Ettler, Justine. ‘Intervening in a male-dominated field: The River Ophelia, the Brat Pack and social realism.’ Hecate 21.2 (Oct 1995): 61-65.
- Hannaford, Victoria. ‘Justine Ettler’s Erotica: Interview with Justine Ettler.’ Farrago, SRC, Parkville, Vic, 1995: 18-19.
- Waldren, Murray. ‘Dirty Realists: Enter the Grunge Gang.’ In Dining Out with Mr Lunch. St Lucia, Qld: UQP, 1999. 70-85.
- Wark, McKenzie. The Virtual Republic. Sydney, NSW: Allen & Unwin, 1997. 106-125.
