= Grug =

Fictional character in a series of children's books

Grug is an Australian fictional character appearing in a series of children's books by the author Ted Prior. They were published between 1979 and 1992 by Hodder & Stoughton, and have now been republished by Simon & Schuster, from 1 June 2009. Three new books have also been published since 1992.

Grug was originally modelled after the fallen top of a burrawang tree (Macrozamia communis), but he more closely resembles a grass tree (Xanthorrhoea), or a small, striped haystack. He is fascinated by the world around him, solving problems that many children experience—such as learning to swim, going to school, and riding a bike—in fun, creative ways.

== Theatre productions ==
Grug has spawned two plays: Grug, which "centres on the fun of visual surprise", and Grug and the Rainbow, based on several of the books and labelled by theatre critic Nicole Russo "amongst the best children's theatre you will find".

== Published works (partial list) ==
- Grug (1979) ISBN 0-340-24636-7 + (2009) ISBN 978-0-7318-1387-2
- Grug and the Big Red Apple (1979) ISBN 0-340-24616-2 + (2009) ISBN 978-0-7318-1389-6
- Grug and the Green Paint (1979) ISBN 0-340-24617-0 + (2009) ISBN 978-0-7318-1392-6
- Grug and his Garden (1979) ISBN 0-340-24618-9 + (2009) ISBN 978-0-7318-1388-9
- Grug in the Playground (1982) ISBN 0-340-26623-6 + (2009) ISBN 978-0-7318-1391-9
- Grug Meets Snoot (1982) ISBN 0-340-26622-8 + (2009) ISBN 978-0-7318-1395-7
- Grug and the Rainbow (1982) ISBN 0-340-26621-X + (2009) ISBN 978-0-7318-1390-2
- Grug Learns to Swim (1982) ISBN 0-340-26620-1 + (2009) ISBN 978-0-7318-1399-5
- Grug has a Birthday (1983) ISBN 0-340-33338-3 + (2009) ISBN 978-0-7318-1408-4
- Grug Goes Fishing (1983) ISBN 0-340-33340-5 + (2009) ISBN 978-0-7318-1407-7
- Grug at the Beach (1983) ISBN 0-340-33344-8 + (2009) ISBN 978-0-7318-1409-1
- Grug Goes to School (1983) ISBN 0-340-33341-3 + (2009) ISBN 978-0-7318-1393-3
- Grug's Word Book (1984) ISBN 0-340-35769-X
- Grug at the Zoo (1985) ISBN 0-340-37609-0 + (2009) ISBN 978-0-7318-1394-0
- Grug and his Bicycle (1985) ISBN 0-340-37606-6 + (2009) ISBN 978-0-7318-1398-8
- Grug at the Snow (1985) ISBN 0-340-37608-2 + (2009) ISBN 978-0-7318-1397-1
- Grug Plays Soccer (1985) ISBN 0-340-37607-4 + (2009) ISBN 978-0-7318-1406-0
- Grug Plays Cricket (1989) ISBN 0-340-49608-8 + (2009) ISBN 978-0-7318-1403-9
- Grug Learns to Cook (1989) ISBN 0-340-49609-6 + (2009) ISBN 978-0-7318-1402-2
- Grug and his Music (1989) ISBN 0-340-49610-X + (2009) ISBN 978-0-7318-1404-6
- Grug Builds a Car (1989) ISBN 0-340-49607-X + (2009) ISBN 978-0-7318-1405-3
- Grug Builds a Boat (1992)ISBN 0-340-56664-7 + (2009) ISBN 978-0-7318-1401-5
- Grug and his Kite (1992) ISBN 0-340-56665-5 + (2009) ISBN 978-0-7318-1396-4
- Grug Learns to Dance (1992) ISBN 0-340-56663-9 + (2009) ISBN 978-0-7318-1410-7
- Grug Goes Shopping (1992) ISBN 0-340-56666-3 + (2009) ISBN 978-0-7318-1400-8
- Grug meets a Dinosaur (2015) ISBN 978-1-925030-52-5
- Grug and His First Easter (2016) ISBN 9781925368246
- Grug and the Bushfire (2020) ISBN 978-1760858483
