= Michael Massey Robinson =

Australian poet (1744–1826)

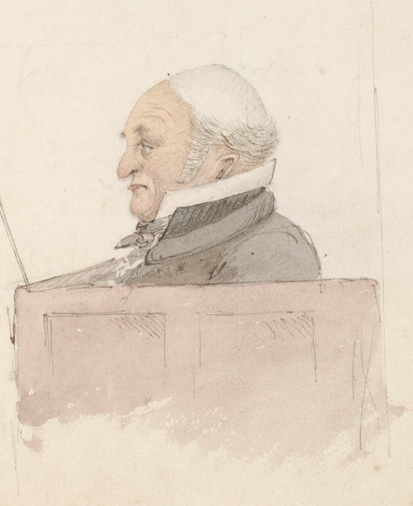
Michael Massey Robinson c1817. State Library of New South Wales

Michael Massey Robinson (1744 – 22 December 1826) was a poet and author of the first published verse in Australia.

== See also ==
- List of convicts transported to Australia
