= Ted Prior (writer) =

Australian children's author

- Born: 1945 (age 80–81); Sydney, Australia
- Education: National Art School
- Occupations: Author, animator, artist
- Years active: Author 1979–1992, educator 1971–2015

Ted Prior (born 1945), is an Australian children's author and artist, best known for his works on the children's series of Grug picture books from 1979 and 1992, he has also worked in film animating and television.

== Biography ==
Ted Prior was born in Sydney and previously worked as a police officer before studying at the National Art School in Sydney. In 1969 he earned a Diploma in Painting. From 1971 to 1974 he taught at the National Art School in Newcastle, before moving to a farm in 1975. Prior's art mediums include drawing, etching, sculpture and assemblage. His works have been displayed in individual and group exhibitions. He worked at the Faculty of Arts and Media at the Hunter Institute of Technology until retiring in 2005.

== See also ==
- Grug
