= Barbara Ker Wilson =

English-born Australian novelist and editor (1929–2020)

Barbara Ker Wilson AM
- In 1957 whilst at Bodley Head
- Born: 24 September 1929; Sunderland, Tyne and Wear, England
- Died: 10 September 2020 (aged 90); Bowral, New South Wales, Australia
- Occupations: editor and novelist
- Known for: discovering Paddington Bear
- Spouse: Peter Tahourdin (1956–2009)
- Children: two daughters

Barbara Ker Wilson AM (24 September 1929 – 10 September 2020) was an English-born Australian novelist. She is credited as the person who "discovered" Paddington Bear. She wrote over twenty books and collated collections of stories. She gained awards for helping other writers.

== Life ==
Wilson was born in Sunderland in 1929. Her parents were Margaret (born Rogers) and William Ker Wilson. Her father was an aeronautical engineer who wrote on that subject. After she attended the North London Collegiate School in 1938, she entered publishing in 1949 at Oxford University Press where she became an assistant editor. She went on to work for Bodley Head and in 1957 she moved to Collins where she discovered a draft by Michael Bond. He had created a book for children featuring the talking bear from Peru named Paddington Bear. After reading the draft at one sitting she phoned the author at the number given. She was put through to Lime Green Studios and Michael Bond who told her that as a TV cameraman he was not supposed to take calls at work.

In 1954, she created the anthology Scottish Folk-Tales and Legends. The first of the twenty novels she wrote was Path-Through-the-Woods which was published in 1958 and thereafter she wrote almost 20 novels for children, including the acclaimed Last Year’s Broken Toys (1962), which gave a child’s-eye view of growing up during the second world war. She also wrote two novels for adults, Jane Austen in Australia (1984) and The Quade Inheritance (1988).

In 1956, she married Peter Tahourdin, a composer. She and her husband moved to Adelaide in 1964 after the 1963 winter to find a better climate. Her husband obtained a job as a composer in Residence at the University of Adelaide. The couple had divorced by 1978. She later moved to Sydney where she returned to publishing, working for Angus & Robertson. Her career in publishing continued at Hodder and Stoughton, Reader's Digest (managing editor of condensed books) and, finally, at University of Queensland Press.

In 2008, she published The Lost Years of Jane Austen which imagines Austen visiting an Australian prison colony.

Ker Wilson died in Bowral, New South Wales on 10 September 2020, survived by her daughters and two grandchildren.

== Awards and honors ==
For her work in children's literature, she received the Pixie O'Harris Award in 1997. In 1999, she won the Dromkeen Medal given to the person who has greatly assisted children's literature in Australia. Five years later she was made a Member of the Order of Australia noting the support she had given to emerging writers.
