= Bailgu =

The Bailgu are an Aboriginal Australian people of the Pilbara region of Western Australia.

== Country ==
Bailgu traditional lands extended over 6,300 square miles (16,000 km^{2}), according to Norman Tindale's estimate, covering the upper Fortescue River, and taking in Roy Hill and eastwards beyond the Goodiadarrie Hills. Their northern extension ran as far as the Chichester Range scarp the Nullagine River divide. The eastern border ran to the western headwaters of the Oakover Davis rivers. Their neighbours further down the Fortescue were the Niabali. Their boundary with the Yindjibarndi lay at Mandanaladji.

== History of contact ==
According to oral traditions handed down by the Bailgu, before the advent of the whites, they were dislocated from the salt marshs on the Fortescue river by pressure from the Panyjima tribe, which drove them further east. This narrative appears to be corroborated by the fact that among western tribes they were known as the Mangguldulkara (people of the marshes).

== Notable people ==
Notable people with Bailgu heritage include:

- Ambelin Kwaymullina, author and academic
- Jill Milroy, indigenous studies educator
- Sally Morgan, author and artist

== Alternative names ==
- Bailgo, Balgu, Palgu, Balju, Balgoo
- Bailko
- Baljgu, Balju
- Boolgoo
- Mangguldulkara (exonym used of them by western tribes)
- Pailgu, Pailgo
- Pal'gu, Bailju
- Paljarri
- Pulgoe

Source: Tindale 1974, p. 239.

== Sources ==
- "AIATSIS map of Indigenous Australia". AIATSIS. 28 July 2023.
- "Tindale Tribal Boundaries" (PDF). Department of Aboriginal Affairs, Western Australia. September 2016. Archived from the original (PDF) on 8 March 2016.
- Tindale, Norman Barnett (1974). "Bailgu (WA)". Aboriginal Tribes of Australia: Their Terrain, Environmental Controls, Distribution, Limits, and Proper Names. Australian National University. ISBN 978-0-708-10741-6. Archived from the original on 24 September 2019.
- Withnell, J. G. (1901). Customs and traditions of the aboriginal natives of North-Western Australia. Roebourne.
