= Chris Neal (screen composer) =

Australian musician and composer

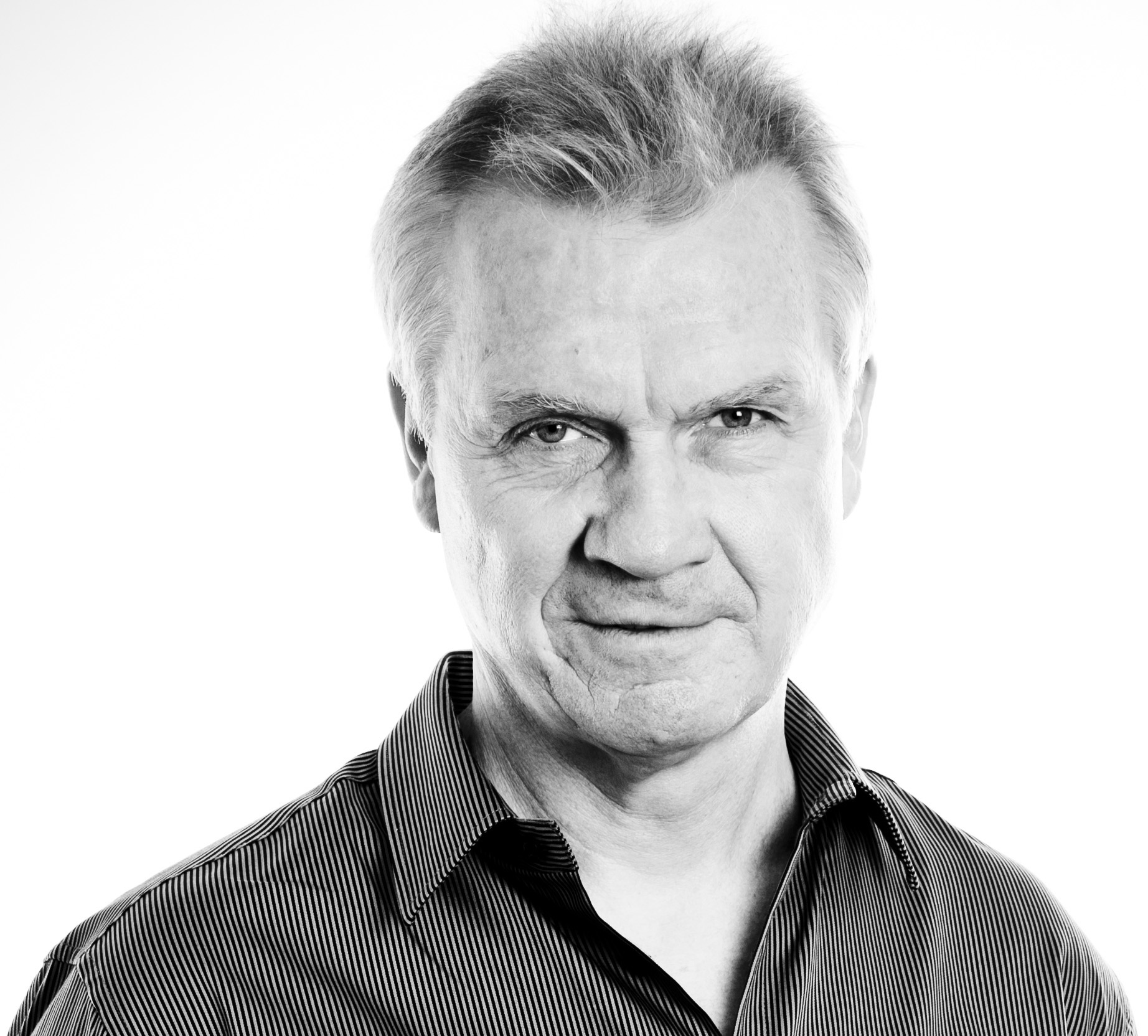
- Neal in 2011
- Born: Christopher Hugh Neal; 1946 (age 79–80); Sydney, New South Wales, Australia
- Education: North Sydney Boys High School Sydney University
- Occupations: Musician; songwriter; record producer; screen composer
- Years active: 1963–present
- Spouse: Mary Neal
- Children: 2

Christopher Hugh Neal (born 1946) is an Australian musician, songwriter, record producer and television and film music composer. His scores include Buddies, Bodyline, The Shiralee, Turtle Beach, Farscape, Archer, Shadow of The Cobra and Emerald City.

During the 1980s, Neal scored several films from the "Winners" series of telemovies, produced by Patricia Edgar of the Australian Children's Television Foundation. Five Times Dizzy, produced by Tom Jeffrey followed soon after. These projects kickstarted what would be a recurring part of his career; scoring and writing songs for children's television dramas including Johnson and Friends, Lift-Off, Kaboodle, Li'l Elvis and the Truckstoppers and more. Neal's songs and music were also featured in stage shows based on "Johnson and Friends", and in 1995-1996, Neal wrote the music for "Lift Off Live"; a stage musical based on the "Lift-Off" television series.

Feature film and television projects continued through the 1990s and 2000s, including Pacific Drive, Foreign Exchange and many more.

== Film and television credits ==
- "Mutiny on the Western Front" (1979)
- "Crosstalk" (1982)
- "Drought" (1982)
- "The Disappearance of Azaria Chamberlain" (1983)
- "The City's Edge" (1983)
- "What Price Valour?" (1983)
- "Crime of the Decade" (1984)
- "Water Babies" (1984)
- "Winners" (1984) ['Top Kid', 'Tarflowers' and 'Quest Beyond Time']
- "Bodyline" (1984)
- "Palace of Dreams" (1985)
- "CBS Storybreak" (1985) ['Hank the Cowdog' and 'Dragon's Blood']
- "Archer" (1985)
- "Rebel" (1985)
- "Five Times Dizzy" (1985)
- "Niel Lynne" (1985)
- "Short Changed" (1985)
- "Around the World in 80 Ways" (1985)
- "The Long Way Home" (1985)
- "Double Sculls" (1985)
- "Natural Causes" (1985)
- "Bullseye" (1986/1987)
- "The Place at the Coast" (1986/1987)
- "Army Wives" (1986/1987)
- "Ground Zero" (1987)
- "The Shiralee" (1987)
- "Future Past" (1987)
- "Emerald City" (1988)
- "Grievous Bodily Harm" (1988)
- "Computer Ghosts" (1988)
- "Mary MacKillop" (1988)
- "Soldier Settler" (1988)
- "Touch the Sun" (1988) ['Peter and Pompey' and 'Princess Kate']
- "Barracuda" (1988)
- "Shadow of the Cobra" (1989)
- "Celia" (1989)
- "More Winners" (1989) ['The Big Wish']
- "A Country Practice" (1989)
- "Afraid to Dance" (1989)
- "Trouble in Paradise" (1989/1990)
- "Johnson & Friends" (1990) [Series 1]
- "The New Adventures of Black Beauty" (1990) [Series 1]
- "The Paper Man" (1990)
- "Turtle Beach" (1991)
- "G.P." (1991) [Series 3]
- "Johnson & Friends" (1991) [Series 2]
- "The Nostradamus Kid" (1992)
- "Lift-Off" (1992) [Series 1]
- "The New Adventures of Black Beauty" (1992) [Series 2] (Co-composed with Braedy Neal)
- "Butterfly Island" (1992)
- "The Sharp End: Witnesses of Vietnam" (1992)
- "Round the Twist" (1992) [Series 2 - Episode 11]
- "G.P." (1992) [Series 4]
- "Law of the Land" (1993)
- "EC Plays Lift-Off" (1993)
- "Jack Be Nimble" (1993)
- "G.P." (1993) [Series 5]
- "Heartland" (1994) (Co-composed with Braedy Neal)
- "The Damnation of Harvey McHugh" (1994)
- "G.P." (1994) [Series 6] (Co-composed with Braedy Neal)
- "Johnson & Friends" (1994) [Series 3]
- "Lift-Off" (1995) [Series 2] (Co-composed with Braedy Neal)
- "Correlli" (1995)
- "Johnson & Friends" (1995) [Series 4] (Co-composed with Braedy Neal)
- "Pacific Drive" (1996) [Series 1] (Co-composed with Braedy Neal)
- "Pacific Drive" (1997) [Series 2] (Co-composed with Braedy Neal)
- "13 Gantry Row" (1998)
- "Mumbo Jumbo" (1998)
- "Crash Zone" (1998/1999) [Series 1] (Co-composed with Braedy Neal)
- "Time and Tide" (1999)
- "Farscape" (1999-2000) [Episodes 1-26] (Co-composed with Braedy Neal and Toby Neal under the name SubVision)
- "Crash Zone" (2001) [Series 2] (Co-composed with Braedy Neal)
- "The Crop" (2003/2004) (Co-composed with Braedy Neal)
- "Noah and Saskia" (2004) (Co-composed with Braedy Neal)
- "Foreign Exchange" (2004) (Co-composed with Braedy Neal)
- "MDA" (2005) [Series 3, Episodes 5-8]
- "The Sleepover Club" (2006) [Series 2] (Co-composed with Braedy Neal)
- "Between Iraq and a Hard Place" (2008)
- "Castaway" (2010)

== Discography ==
- "Man-Child" (1972) - musical cast recording.
- "Winds of Isis" (1974) - solo progressive rock album.
- "The Newcastle Song" (1974) (Bob Hudson) [as Producer]
- "Darwin Opera House Appeal" (1975) [as co producer]
- "The Marshall Bros." (1975) [as Producer]
- "Benny and the Jets" (1975) [as Producer]
- "Rak Off Normie" (1975) (Maureen Elkner) [as Producer and writer]
- "The Word Was Gough" (1975) [as Producer and writer]
- "Tasmanian Military Tattoo" (1976) [as Producer]
- "Picnic at Hanging Rock" (1976) (Nolan/Buddle Quartet) [as Producer]
- "Steph. 'n' Us" 1977 (Stéphane Grappelli) [as Engineer]
- "Great Hits of Scotland" (1977) (John McDonald) [as Producer]
- "Francis Butler" (1978) [as Producer]
- "Hokum Ensemble" (1978) [as Producer]
- "Rod Boucher" (1980) [as Producer]
- "Crosstalk" (1981) - movie soundtrack.
- "Buddies" (1984) - movie soundtrack.
- "Turtle Beach" (1991) - movie soundtrack.
- "An Afternoon with Johnson and Friends" (1992) - children's album based on a popular television series.
- Seven soundtrack recordings for "Lift Off" ranging from 1992-1995 - children's television soundtracks.
- "Heartland" (1994) - television soundtrack.
- "Johnson and Friends - Making Music" (1994) - children's television soundtrack.
- "Lift-Off Live - Songs from the Musical" (1995) - children's musical cast recording.
- "Songs from Li'l Elvis Jones and the Truckstoppers" (1998) - children's television soundtrack.
- "Farscape" (2001) - television soundtrack.
- "Themes" (2005) - a compilation of popular movie and television themes.
- "Cooling Pond" (2008) - independent project, co written and produced with collaborator Ian Davidson.
- "Songs For an Empty Street" (2018) - alternative/indie rock album under the name Sirclo.
- "High Time - Songs from the Musical" (2021) - concept album for a cancelled stage musical project, released under the name Sirclo and Friends.
- "70s Unreleased" (2021) - a collection of unreleased songs from the 1970s, released under the name Sirclo.
- "Not Robinson Crusoe" (2021) - a collection of blues/rock songs released under the name Riff Gun.
- "Winds of Isis - Remastered" (2021) - a remastered re-release of the prog rock classic from 1974.
- "Metropolis 1980" (2021) - A remastered compilation consisting of the majority of the score for the cult classic film 'Metropolis'.
