= Man-Child (musical) =

Australian musical written by Chris Neal

Man-Child is an Australian musical written by Chris Neal, labelled "a musical odyssey in search of truth". The musical has no unifying plot and no characters, but consists of a series of independent dream sequences presented through 17 songs.

Neal first conceived the musical working in Vietnam in 1968. After a short season at the Playhouse in Canberra, Man-Child opened in Sydney in August 1971 in a 600-seat plastic bubble tent called the 'Bubble Theatre' at the Sydney Showground. The production toured to the SGIO Theatre in Brisbane and to Perth and Adelaide. A cast album was released in 1972.
