= Touch the Sun (TV series) =

Series of Australian television films

Touch the Sun is a series of television films commissioned by Patricia Edgar for the Australian Children's Television Foundation. It was to be the ACTF's project for the Australian Bicentenary celebrations in 1988. The Australian Bicentennial Authority named Touch the Sun as the Bicentenary official children's series for 1988. Edgar's plan was to locate stories in every state in Australia showing the diversity of the Australian landscape. It was written, produced, and directed by some of the top film and tv personnel in Australia. Patricia Edgar was Executive Producer of the show and it was backed by the ABC, Australian Film Commission, the New South Wales Film Corporation, the South Australian Film and Television Financing Fund, the South Australian Film Corporation, Film Victoria and the French distribution company Revcom International. National Trustees agreed to act as investor representatives for Touch the Sun in 1986 and the series was offered to the Australian Television networks for telecast in 1988. The $7.5 million necessary for production of this unique children’s series for the Bicentennial year was fully subscribed by 30 June 1987. The ABC paid $2 million for the Australian rights to Touch the Sun, the most the ABC had ever spent to acquire the rights to a program.

The six episodes of the Foundation’s bicentennial telefeature series, Touch the Sun, were produced entirely in 1987/88. Production took place in every state of Australia: Top Enders was shot in the Northern Territory, Devil's Hill in Tasmania, Princess Kate in New South Wales, Peter and Pompey in Queensland, Captain Johnno in South Australia and The Gift in both Victoria and Western Australia.

== Scope ==
The six telemovies (each of 95 minutes' duration) deal with issues important to children: adoption, multiculturalism, country life, fame, running away and deafness. The series was aimed at reflecting contemporary issues for Australian children by touching upon the critical nature of early adolescence, how to overcome obstacles faced during this time and what it means to look towards the future at this young stage of life.

== Production timeline ==
By October 1987, production was well underway with filming completed and post production started on Peter & Pompey; Captain Johnno and Top Enders. Additionally, filming had begun on Princess Kate. Devil's Hill and The Gift were in pre-production with filming due to start on 2 and 16 November 1987 respectively.

By December 1987, Princess Kate had also completed shooting. The Gift was shooting in Victoria at this time, and the production team was set to travel to Perth on 6 December to complete production in WA.

== Captain Johnno ==
Captain Johnno
- Written by: Rob George
- Directed by: Mario Andreacchio

Production
- Budget: $1.235 million

Original release
- Release: 1988

(South Australia)

=== Premise ===
Johnno is a deaf ten year old boy with good intentions who lives in Streeton, a small fishing town, during the 1950s. He spends a lot of his time alone by the water and playing at the beach. The locals of the town who farm and fish don't understand him and look upon him as though he is a bit of a clown. Johnno's sister, Julie, is the only one who really cares and helps him out, but Julie has to leave home for the first time to go to boarding school and suddenly Johnno's life is uprooted. He also has a new teacher at school that is far less tolerant of his 'unusual' and 'disruptive' behaviour in the classroom as she puts it. As a result, Johnno gets expelled and his mother is left to educate him at home. This proves to be very challenging because she is already a working mother herself.

The only positive event happening in Johnno's life is the arrival of Tony, a solitary Italian fisherman without a penny to his name who cannot speak English. Johnno sees a bit of himself in Tony and is consequently left feeling very betrayed when he believes Tony has violated the terms of their new friendship. Johnno unintentionally becomes tied up in a number of mishaps which pushes his mother to breaking point and she decides to send him to a 'special school'. But when Johnno hears about this plan he runs away, sailing to a nearby island with the intention of living solo away from the complex problems society brings. However, life on the island is harsh with exposure and dehydration taking their toll. He grows increasingly desperate for food and climbs a cliff, only to slip and fall into the dangerous surf. He washes ashore the isolated beach injured and in need of help. Back in Streeton, Johnno's lost presence is noticed and a search party begins, but Tony is the only one with any idea where Johnno might be. Tony ignores the instructions of the search organisers and heads for the island himself just in time to save Johnno. Tony and Johnno reconcile there and Johnno comes to realise running away from his problems doesn't help. He sets a new and more independent course for his future with Tony's help.

=== Cast ===
- Damien Walters as Johnno
- Joe Petruzzi as Tony
- John Waters as Frank
- Rebecca Sykes as Julie
- Michele Fawdon as Kathleen
- Elspeth Ballantyne as Mrs Greenwood
- Vivienne Graves
- Sam Sowton
- Phoebe Salter
- Peter Green
- Henry Salter
- Grant Piro

=== Launch ===
In Adelaide, the premiere screening of Captain Johnno was held at the Academy Cinema on Thursday, 7 April 1988. The film, which was introduced by the premier of South Australia, the Hon. John Bannon, MP, had been especially subtitled for the hearing impaired. Present at the screening were: the Managing Director of the South Australian Film Corporation, John Morris, AM; the writer of the film, Rob George; the producer, Jane Ballantyne; the director, Mario Andreacchio; the child stars of the film, Damien Walters (Johnno) and Rebecca Skyes (Julie); members of the film and television industry and the media; and members of the deaf community. The following morning a special screening of the film was held for hearing impaired children and their classmates, who included children from Damien Walters’ class. The film was received very enthusiastically.

=== International Emmy Award ===
In 1988 the Foundation won the most prestigious international television award for Captain Johnno as part of the Touch the Sun series. This was the first time an Australian Children’s program won an Emmy and only the second time an Emmy was awarded to an Australian program. Captain Johnno, one of the six films in the Touch the Sun series, was entered in the Children's and Young People's Section of the Awards which are presented by the International Council of the American National Academy of Television, Arts and Sciences. At the Awards ceremony held in new York on 21 November, only five Emmys were presented after judges had viewed 198 entries from 48 countries.

== Devil's Hill ==
Devil's Hill
- Based on: Novel by Nan Chauncy
- Written by: David Phillips
- Directed by: Esben Storm

Production
- Producer: Jill Robb

Original release
- Release: 1988

(Tasmania)

=== Premise ===
Badge has always felt daunted by his cousin Sam because he has spent time in the city and been exposed to a world Badge can only imagine, having spent his whole life on a remote farm in rugged southwest Tasmania. However, the tables get turned once Sam's mother falls ill and his father is away working. Sam and his two younger sisters, Bron and Sheppie, are sent to live with Badge and his mum, Jessie. Sam has an arrogant disdain for the bush that gets on Badge's nerves, so he forms an alliance with Bron who is timid and fearful, but sensitive. However, at the same time, Badge begins to question his father's beloved wilderness and whether that is the kind of life he wants for himself, when he hears of the glorified tales of the city.

One night the tension between Sam and Badge breaks and their feelings appear to be reflected in the violent weather occurring in the valley. By morning, they discover that Brindle, the family heifer, has escaped into the dense bush and needs to be tracked down and recovered. The kids persuade Jessie to bring them with her on her trek through the mountainous Tasmanian wilderness to find Brindle.

En route they are led up into the valley to a dark and mysterious crag called Devil's Hill. They find tracks which indicate they are headed in the right direction, but the path is dangerous with tiger snakes and raging rivers. Supplies are limited and Jessie starts to think that they may have missed Brindle, so she backtracks and leaves the kids at their camping spot for the day. Shortly after Jessie leaves, the kids spot Brindle in the valley far below. The boys climb down towards Brindle, but Badge slips which frightens her away. Sam scolds Badge, but Badge decides to break camp and follow Brindle.

This new chase leads the kids into adventure and conflict, and only by resolving their differences do they find a way to pool their talents and recapture Brindle. Not only do they end up finding Brindle, but also the lost herd that will enable Badge's parents to have a successful farm. Badge, Sam, Bron and Sheppie drive the herd home in triumph and meet up with Jessie along the way, who is overjoyed with their findings.

Once they return home, they are welcomed with more good news – Sam's mother has recovered and his father has arrived to take him home. To everyone's surprise, Sam asks his father if he can return to the farm next summer, and Badge decides he doesn't mind the idea of going to school with his cousins. Badge and Sam's rivalry turns to mutual respect.

=== Cast ===
- Cameron Atkins
- Peter Hehir
- Mary Haire
- John Flaus
- Alexander 'Matthew' Jacobs
- Emma Pugh
- Jane McArthur

=== Launch ===
The premiere screening of Devil's Hill was introduced by The Hon. Peter Rae, MHA, the Tasmanian Minister for Education and the Arts, at the University of Tasmania on Wednesday, 13 April 1988. Attending the screening were: Dr Patricia Edgar; Graeme Foster, the Tasmanian representative on the ACTF Board; director, Esben Storm; the child stars of the film, Alexander Jacobs, Cameron Atkins, Jane McArthur and Emma Pugh; crew members, educationalists; and the media.

== The Gift ==
The Gift
- Written by: Paul Cox; Jeff Peck
- Directed by: Paul Cox
- Starring: Ken James

Production
- Producer: Tony Llewellyn-Jones
- Cinematography: Nino G. Martinetti
- Running time: 90 mins

Original release
- Release: 1988

(Victoria and Western Australia)

=== Premise ===
Nicos and Sofia Georgialis are Greek-Australian siblings living in a comfortable inner-city suburb, who win first prize in a national lottery. To their amazement, they become the new owners of five hundred hectares of beautiful bushland in Western Australia – 3,000km from their Melbourne home. The big win throws their lives into turmoil. Tensions in the family rise and Sofia breaks up with her boyfriend. Their grandfather, Christos, joins them on an all-expenses paid trip to visit the new plot of land, leaving the family nearly split in two. Sofia and their dad, Con, want to sell the land to purchase a new modern house for them all outside of the city, while Nicos and their mum, Helen, don't want to leave their current home.

While the kids and their grandfather are away, Con agrees to sell the trees on the new land in order to get money to buy the new house he wants. Nicos and Sofia are unaware and continue on their trip.

When they arrive they find it magical, but mysterious. They realise that someone is attempting to sabotage them, when they encounter a barrier in the road, and then notice one of their car's tyres has been deflated. They continue on foot, only to encounter an elderly lady pointing a shotgun at them. The lady, Vera and her intellectually disabled son, George, live on the land that they had been told they'd won. Initially the kids are terrified, but soon realise that Vera and George are harmless and vulnerable and that this land is their refuge.

Christos and the kids return to the hotel, where Sofia and Nicos tear up the agreement with the timber company, because they realise cutting down the trees will jeopardise Vera and George's safety and seclusion. They have a television interview where they let the country know that they want the land to be left alone. Meanwhile, back in Melbourne, their dad has already arranged for their current home to be auctioned the next day. Sofia calls her father to confront him, to no avail, so she and Nicos persuade their grandfather to overcome his fear of flying in order to return to Melbourne in time to save their home. Christos finally agrees to board the plane and they arrive home just as the auction begins.

Urged on by the two kids, Christos outbids a determined buyer. When Sofia, Nicos and Christos walk through the door, Con is surprised, but grateful that the kids subverted the auction, as he was beginning to have doubts about selling the family home and facing opposition wasn't helping. The family ends up reunited in their home and the kids learn an important lesson that getting something for nothing can be dangerous.

=== Cast ===
- Nicholas Hatjiandreau as Nikos
- Vicki Serbos as Sophia
- Alexis Anthopolous as Christos
- Constantin Laras as Costa
- Rena Frangioudakis as Helena
- Peter Felmingham as Peter
- Margaret Fort as Vera
- Bill McClusky as George
- Ken James as Clive Miller
- Susanne Chapman as Melissa
- Greg Hocking as Auctioneer
- Andrew Stuart as Auctioneer

== Peter and Pompey ==
Peter and Pompey
- Written by: John Misto
- Directed by: Michael Carson
- Starring: Emil Minty; Paul Chubb; Lynnette Curran; Dennis Miller; Amanda Muggleton
- Music by: Chris Neal

Production
- Producer: Margot McDonald
- Cinematography: Julian Penney
- Running time: 94 mins
- Budget: $1.43 million

Original release
- Release: 1988

(Queensland)

=== Premise ===
In a small town called Gamma in North Queensland, Peter (Clayton Williamson), a quiet boy, Margaret (Kate McDonald), the mayor's intelligent daughter, and Wayne (Emil Minty), the town bully, are united by a sudden desire to learn Latin in order to translate strange inscriptions they've found on a cave wall. Unaware of their discovery, the high school Latin teacher is perplexed by the unlikely trio's interest in a dead language.

The three children explore the cavern further and discover an authentic Roman boat, hidden centuries ago by a Roman poet. After some time, their secret discovery is leaked, and the small town has quickly turned into a hyped-up tourist destination. The children's lives are turned upside down as they become celebrities, and this new status destroys any privacy they had before. They are swept up in high pressure deals and witness their parents becoming involved in crass commercial schemes. Before long, the three of them wish they'd never stumbled upon the boat at all.

While all the commotion occurs, they continue to translate the Latin inscriptions they found. Unsettling information is soon revealed—the boat is cursed. They learn that the boat's owner made a pact with the gods to ensure that anyone who comes into contact with it would be punished. Peter, Margaret, and Wayne believe that what is happening in Gamma is the work of the curse, and they devise a challenging plan to break it by fulfilling the Roman poet's pledge. With help from their Latin teacher, they throw the boat into the harbour where it vanishes into darkness, swallowed up by the sea under a sky filled with lightning.

The people of Gamma are shocked to their senses and realise the terrible impact the discovery of the boat has had on them. Peter, Margaret, and Wayne resume their former happy lives, and quickly appreciate the benefits of being normal kids in a normal town.

=== Cast ===
- Clayton Williamson as Peter Driscoll
- Kate McDonald (daughter of Garry McDonald) as Margaret Bainbridge
- Emil Minty as Wayne Barbuto
- Aaron Ferguson
- Paul Chubb as Mayor Leo Bainbridge
- Lynnette Curran as Connie Driscoll
- Dennis Miller as Maxie Barbuto
- Amanda Muggleton as Miria Malloy
- Basil Clarke
- Bruce Venables

== Princess Kate ==
Princess Kate
- Written by: Kristin Williamson; David Williamson
- Directed by: George Ogilvie
- Starring: Justine Clarke; Rebekah Elmaloglou; Claudia Karvan; Lorna Lesley; Martin Sacks
- Music by: Chris Neal

Production
- Producer: Antonia Barnard
- Running time: 95 mins

Original release
- Release: 1988

(New South Wales)

=== Premise ===
When Kate (Justine Clarke) turns fourteen, she feels like the luckiest girl in the world. She has great friends, a gorgeous home and very wealthy parents. Her parents even gift her a seven metre yacht, christened 'Princess Kate'.

Shortly afterwards, Kate finds out she was adopted. At first she's angry, but later she is left feeling distraught. She starts to lose interest in all the things she once loved, including her schoolwork and practising the piano. Kate wants to learn why she was never told of this before, and most importantly, she wants to find out who she really is. Her parents are hurt and upset by Kate's reaction, but she insists that she must find her 'real' parents.

Kate sets out to conduct her own research and with help from a volunteer group she is almost certain she has tracked down her 'real' mother's telephone number. She gathers up the courage to call, but when she does, she gets the phone slammed down in her ear and is left feeling absolutely crushed. Kate ends up being consumed by her own feelings, and fails to see how upset and worried she has made her adoptive parents. Soon the family's fortune begins to tumble, and her father's business lands in trouble when his health starts failing.

Kate impulsively visits her natural mother's home without warning where she meets a justifiably furious Glenys (Lorna Lesley), as Glenys' husband Greg (Martin Sacks) has no idea of Kate's existence. Kate is permitted to stay until morning, on the condition that she be introduced to Glenys' other children as their second cousin. Despite the awkward atmosphere, Kate and Glenys' daughter, May (Rebekah Elmaloglou) instantly gel. They cannot believe how much they have in common, including their shared love of music.

The next day when Kate returns home, she realises that she has put an enormous amount of strain on her adoptive parents, so she reassures them that her quest is over and that she has no intention of leaving them. However, she does ask to let May come and stay with them when they will both be participating in an upcoming music competition.

A few months later the two families awkwardly meet, but this is a fulfilling moment for Kate. By this stage Glenys and her husband have overcome the initial anger and shock of Kate returning into Glenys' world.

At the competition, both Kate and May put on brilliant performances, but it is May who takes out the grand prize. Initially Kate is disappointed that she herself she did not win, but her affection for her sister triumphs. Kate learns to value relationships over material possessions and suggests to her dad that they sell her new yacht in order to help solve the family's financial crisis.

=== Cast ===
- Justine Clarke as Kate McLelland
- Lyndel Rowe as Anne McLelland
- Alan Cassell as Bob McLelland
- Myra Noblet as Gran
- Shane Tickner
- Rebekah Elmaloglou as May Mathieson
- Lorna Lesley as Glenys Mathieson
- Martin Sacks as Greg Mathieson
- Mouche Phillips as Sarah
- Claudia Karvan as Amanda
- Beth Buchanan as Benedicte
- Annie Byron as Cheryl Kelly
- Nick Enright as Barry Kelly
- Ben Gabriel as Taxi driver

== Top Enders ==
Top Enders
- Written by: Michael Aitkens; Jackie McKimmie
- Directed by: Jackie McKimmie

Production
- Producer: Jill Robb
- Cinematography: Jamie Doolan
- Running time: 93 mins

Original release
- Release: 1988

(Northern Territory)

=== Premise ===
Alice is a young, tough, independent child. Her mum, Sue, works as a blackjack dealer in the Darwin casino and so Alice has learnt to take care of herself. She's a no-nonsense kind of girl, which often lands her in sparring arguments with her friend Mick, an Aboriginal boy who goes to the same school.

One day, Alice's father, Jack, reappears and wants to settle in with her and Sue, but Alice finds this a difficult adjustment because her father has disappointed her before. She sees that her mum is going to let Jack back into their lives and decides to leave home herself until her mum returns to her senses.

While she's on the road she bumps into Mick who is searching for his Uncle Roy, a rider who travels the rodeo circuit and is Mick's role model. Alice and Mick reluctantly share their journey by hitching rides, camping and 'borrowing' a boat to get to Katherine. However, once they arrive in Katherine, Mick learns that he's missed Uncle Roy, the rodeo show is over, and his aunt puts him on the next bus to Darwin. Meanwhile, Alice gets approached by a policeman and because she's worried about the consequences of her earlier actions she jumps into her mum's Moke that happens to be parked outside the police station and starts to drive out of Katherine. Before long she spots Mick sitting on the back of a broken down bus and so the two of them end up driving along a desert track in order to find the outstation where Mick's tribal people are living. Trouble strikes when the Moke runs out of petrol and they are left to proceed with their journey on foot.

Mick discovers that his knowledge of the desert isn't quite what he thought it was, and the two of them are in fact lost and in quite a dangerous predicament where dehydration and sunstroke start taking their toll.

Meanwhile, Jack and Sue are frantic after having followed the children's trail to Katherine and learning that Alice has taken the Moke. An extensive police search and rescue is in full swing. Jack follows his own gut instinct and the advice of an Aboriginal man who passed the children earlier and ends up finding the deserted Moke. By now Jack knows he's on the right track and races on, but in the heat of it all he rounds a crest at top speed just before he spots Alice and Mick and ends up having to swerve to avoid hitting them, which results in him crashing the car. Alice cares for her injured father while Mick goes in search of help which he finds in the nick of time and the three of them end up safe. Alice is reunited with her mum and Jack goes to hospital. Mick goes back to his aunt in Darwin and Alice realises that despite her father's faults, he does truly love her.

=== Cast ===
- John Jarratt
- Madeleine Blackwell
- Bennendine Woods
- Donald Dale
- Tom Lewis as Roy
- Justine Saunders
- Bernadette Hudson
- Mai Nguyen
- Willy Johnson
- Marcus Rosas

=== Launch ===
On Wednesday, 16 March 1988, the premiere screening of Top Enders was held at the Museum Theaterette in Darwin. The film was launched in association with The Hon. Don Dale, MLA, the Northern Territory Minister for Health and Community Services. Dr Patricia Edgar, Director of the Foundation and Ray Norman, the N.T. representative of the ACTF Board were present, along with Bennedine Woods, who played Alice, Madeleine Blackwell who played Alice's mother Sue, other cast and crew members, educationalists and the media.

== National Launch ==
On Tuesday, 15 March 1988, the series Touch the Sun was officially launched by Hazel Hawke on a sunset cruise of Sydney Harbour. Also present on the cruise were: The Hon. Gary Punch, MP, Minister for Arts and Territories; David Hill, managing Director of the Australian Broadcasting Corporation; Geoffrey Daniels, Chief Executive of Revcom Television; Dr Patricia Edgar, Director of the Australian Children’s Television Foundation; Wendy McCarthy, General Manager – Communications, the Australian Bicentennial Authority; Touch the Sun cast and crew members; and members of the film and television industry and the media.

== Screenings ==
Touch the Sun screened nationally at 6:30pm, Sunday evenings on the ABC for six consecutive weeks from 27 March 1988. The series was critically acclaimed.

After winning an International Emmy Award, Captain Johnno was re-screened on the ABC as a special event on 21 December 1988 at 8:30 pm.

Touch the Sun re-screened as part of the ABC’s Sunday Afternoon Summer Edition program, which went to air from December 1991 to February 1992.

Captain Johnno was screened on the Ansett In-Flight Entertainment Service in 1992.

Touch the Sun re-screened nationally as part of the Family Album series on the ABC, Saturday evenings at 6.00 pm, from 26 February 1994.

Touch the Sun was screened on The Disney Channel at 7.30 pm Sundays in February and March 1997.

=== Screenings for the Hearing Impaired Children ===
The Foundation held a screening of the subtitled version of Captain Johnno at the State Film theatre in Melbourne on 2 August 1988. The screening was attended by 240 children from schools for the deaf and from schools with attached hearing impaired units. Janet Holmes a Court, Chairman of the Foundation welcomed the children to the screening with the assistance of Julie Rees from the Victorian School for the Deaf, who translated Mrs Holmes a Court’s welcome into sign language. The film was very well received by the children and their teachers. The Foundation held a screening of the subtitled version of Captain Johnno at the Theatre of the Australian Film Television and Radio School in Sydney on 28 November 1988. The children were welcomed to the screening by Dr Patricia Edgar, Director of the Foundation, whose remarks were translated into sign language. Some 200 children from schools for the deaf and schools with attached hearing impaired units thoroughly enjoyed the film.

On Thursday 3 May 1990 the Foundation, in conjunction with the Young Variety Club of Western Australia, held a screening for deaf children of the subtitled version of Captain Johnno in Perth.

== Festivals & Awards ==
=== International Emmy Award ===
The ACTF took out a prestigious International Emmy Award presented by the International Council of the National Academy of Television Arts and Sciences in 1988. Captain Johnno, a telemovie from the Touch the Sun series was awarded First prize in the Children’s and Young people’s Section at a Gala Dinner in New York.

=== First International Film festival for Children – Sofia ===
Devil's Hill, Princess Kate and Captain Johnno of the Touch the Sun series were screened at the First International Festival for Children held in Sofia, Bulgaria from 14–22 July 1988.

=== The Paters ===
At the presentation of the 1988 Bicentennial Paters presented by the Australasian Academy of Broadcast Arts and Sciences at Expo 88 in Brisbane, Australia. More than 1600 television, film and radio entries in 110 categories from 46 countries were judged.

In the major Drama and Variety Entertainment category the Australian Children's Television Foundation took two of the three children’s program awards. Touch the Sun received the children's Drama program – Series Award.

=== AFI Awards ===
George Ogilvie was nominated in the Best Director – telemovie category of the AFI (Australian Film Institute) Awards for his direction of Princess Kate. The awards were presented in Sydney, Australia on 10 October 1988.

=== Chicago International Festival of Children’s Films ===
At the Chicago International Festival of Children’s Films held from 14–23 October 1988, Devil's Hill was awarded First Prize for Live Action in the feature length Video Section.

=== Australian Television Society Awards for Excellence ===
At the Australian Television Society Awards held in Melbourne and Sydney on Saturday, 19 November 1988, Touch the Sun won the award for Excellence for Children's Drama (Peter & Pompey); the Award for Excellence in Scriptwriting – One-Off Drama or Mini-Series (Peter & Pompey by John Misto); and the Award for Excellence in a Performance by a Juvenile Actor (Damien Walters in Captain Johnno).

=== Australian Cinematographers' Society Awards ===
At the Australian Cinematographers' Society Awards, announced on 29 October 1988, Roger Dowling won a Gold Cinema Award for his work as cinematographer on Captain Johnno.

=== Berlin International Film festival ===
Devil's Hill was selected for screening in the Children and Youth section of the Berlin International Film Festival held from 10–21 February 1989.

=== 7th International Film Festival for Youth ===
All Touch the Sun films were screened during the 7th International Film Festival for Youth held in Lyon, France from 13–23 March 1989. Captain Johnno was screened in the Competition Section and all other films in the Information Section. Captain Johnno received a high distinction (runner up) in the Grand Jury prize section of the Festival.

=== The Grenfell Henry Lawson Festival of Arts ===
Touch the Sun won the award for best Australian produced television series presented in Grenfell, New South Wales, on 10 June 1989 as part of the town's Queen’s Birthday weekend Henry Lawson Festival of Arts.

=== Banff Television festival ===
Captain Johnno and Princess Kate were selected for screening in the Banff Television Festival which was held in Canada from 4–10 June 1989. Captain Johnno was one of three finalists in the children's section.

=== The First International Film Festival for Children and Young people – Bulgaria ===
The fourth International Children's Assembly attended by more than 1000 children from all over the world was held in Bulgaria from 13–22 July 1988. As part of the Children's Assembly the First International Film festival for Children and Young people was held at the National palace of Culture in Sofia.

The Foundation entered three films, Princess Kate, Captain Johnno and Devil's Hill from the Touch the Sun series in the Festival. In response the Festival organisers through the Consulate General of the People's Republic of Bulgaria in Sydney invited the directors of Captain Johnno and Devil's Hill to attend the Film Festival along with child stars from their casts.

On 11 July 1988 Mario Andreacchio (director – Captain Johnno), Esben Storm (director – Devil’s Hill), Damien Walters ('Johnno' – Captain Johnno), Alexander Jacobs ('Badge' – Devil's Hill) and Emma Pugh ('Bron – Devil's Hill) took part in the “Children’s Assembly of Peace” which takes place every three years in Bulgaria. Children from 122 countries took part in varied activities and visited different parts of Bulgaria.

Meanwhile, Andreacchio and Storm attended the First International Film festival for Children and Young People. They reported positive audience responses to the three Touch the Sun films screened at the festival and considerable interest in the foundation's work. During a screening of Captain Johnno attended by approximately 3,000 children, Walters, who is profoundly deaf, addressed the audience using sign language. Andreacchio interpreted his remarks into English, and a Bulgarian interpreter translated them into Bulgarian.

=== Carousel International Du Film De Rimouski ===
Captain Johnno and Princess Kate screened at this festival, held in Quebec, Canada, from 18–24 September 1989, at the request of the Festival coordinator.

=== Cinekid Amsterdam ===
Captain Johnno and Princess Kate screened at this Festival held in Amsterdam from 11–18 October 1989, at the request of The Netherlands Children’s Youth Film Centre.

=== London Film festival ===
Captain Johnno and Devil's Hill screened at the London Film Festival, held from 11–26 November 1989, at the Festival’s request.

Due to the response to Captain Johnno from the deaf community, the British Film Institute purchased a subtitled print of the film for their library.

On 7 December 1989, at an evening hosted by Sir Richard Attenborough, the Institute presented extracts of the film at a debate on access to the cinema for the deaf and hearing impaired.

=== International Children’s Film Festival of India ===
Peter & Pompey screened at this festival held in New Delhi 14–23 November 1989, at the request of the Australian High Commission of India.

=== Oulu Children’s Film Festival ===
Captain Johnno screened at this festival, held in Finland 20–26 November 1989, at the Festival's request.

=== Cleveland International Film festival ===
Peter & Pompey and Devil's Hill screened in the Cleveland International Film Festival held in the USA 19–29 April 1990.

=== Filmfest DC ===
Peter & Pompey screened at Filmfest DC, the International Film Festival held in Washington, USA from 25 April to 6 May 1990.

=== Australian Film festival at Riyadh ===
The Australian Embassy in Riyadh, Saudi Arabia, screened all of the Touch the Sun films at its second film festival held throughout May and June 1990.

=== Junior Dublin Film festival ===
Devil's Hill, Peter & Pompey and Captain Johnno screened at the Junior Dublin Film festival held from 13–21 October 1990.

=== Baltimore FilmForum ===
Devil's Hill screened at the Baltimore Film Forum in the USA in April 1991, at the request of the Festival organisers.

=== Cinemagic ===
At Cinemagic held in Belfast from 21–29 September 1990, Captain Johnno was awarded First prize by the Guild of Regional Film Writers’ Jury.

=== Children's Week Film & Television Award ===
The Foundation was awarded the 1989 New South Wales Children’s Week Award for Touch the Sun. The Award was presented to the Director of the Foundation, Patricia Edgar, by the Hon. Virginia Chadwick, MLC, at a special awards ceremony held at Parliament House, Sydney on 26 October 1989.

=== Children’s Television festival, China ===
In June 1990 the Foundation received a Children’s Television Program Award from China Central TV for Captain Johnno.

=== Kinderfilmfestival ===
Top Enders screened as part of a Retrospective of Australian Children's Films 1927-1990 at the 9th International Kinderfilmfestival held in Essen, Germany from 1–10 November 1991.

=== Kinderkino ===
Captain Johnno screened at the Kinderkino festival held in Berlin, Germany 15–18 November 1991.

=== KinderKinotage ===
In November 1992, Devil's Hill was screened at the 7th Berlin KinderKinotage in Germany at the request of the festival Committee.

== Publication ==
CBS/FOX Video released Touch the Sun Video School Packs and Touch the Sun rental videocassettes in August 1988. As at 30 June 1993 CBS/FOX Video reported sales of 6,335 Touch the Sun videotapes. As at 30 June 1994 CBS/Fox Video reported sales of 6,604 Touch the Sun videotapes.

In 1995 the Foundation began marketing Touch the Sun video packs to schools and to 30 June 1995 report sales of 178 packs.

REEL Entertainment released a number of Touch the Sun titles on the retail sell-through market in Australia.

VHS copies were made available for general release and Captain Johnno appeared in a subtitled classroom edition.

Originally only one of the six movies, Princess Kate, was released on DVD in Australia.

Echo Bridge Entertainment once offered Devils Hill, Captain Johnno and The Journey on one disk, and The Gift, Top Enders and Peter and Pompey as part of a two-disk compilation with Rabbit Proof Fence and Secret of the Andes on the other. In 2014 this title was no longer in their catalogue.

Australian Children's Television Foundation subsequently released Touch the Sun - Top Enders and Peter & Pompey, and Touch the Sun - Devil's Hill and Captain Johnno as two separate DVDs.

=== Books ===
Books were published to accompany each of the six films. Sales by June were 54,000 and three titles (Princess Kate, Captain Johnno and Peter & Pompey) were on the children's paperbacks best-seller list. Penguin Books Australia Ltd reported sales of 89,000 Touch the Sun books to 30 June 1995.

=== Study Kits ===
Study kits were produced to accompany the videocassettes and these were included in the Touch The Sun Video School packs.

== Reviews ==
'SUPERLATIVES abound for the ABC's successful foray into adult television for discerning youngsters, the Touch the Sun series.' The Sun News-Pictorial, Melbourne, 13 April 1988

'Children's television – so often discussed, so often reviled – takes a mighty leap forward in Australia this weekend on Two with the start of Touch the Sun… and it uses the best of what Australia has to offer in terms of writers, directors, producers and actors.' The West Australian – TV Guide, Perth, 26 March 1988

'It is refreshing to see some imagination shown in the production of children's television.' Daily News, Perth, 25 March 1988

'It (Touch the Sun) is very different and a wonderful addition to the next six weeks' viewing.' News Mail, Bundaberg, Queensland, 26 March 1988

'Overall, it (Touch the Sun) is quality viewing with loads of action.' The Sunday Sun, Brisbane, 27 March 1988

'Touch the Sun is relevant, real-life drama to be enjoyed by people of all ages. The films are imaginative and entertaining adventures of mystery, comedy, pathos and fantasy.' The Sunday Examiner, Launceston, Tasmania, 27 March 1988

'Touch the Sun is an excellent series of children's films from which adults have much to learn.' Inverell Times, NSW, 31 March 1988

'Touch the Sun shows a different short story for children each week full of fun, adventure, mystery and plenty of thrills…. Make sure you're watching it!' Central Western Daily, Orange, NSW, 8 April 1988

'I would not mind doubling my money to 16 cents a day to see a few more of these quality movies which have been so beautifully filmed and scripted.' Daily News, Perth, 22 April 1988

'The Touch the Sun series began in March and has provided six top-rate shows aimed at families and kids.' News Mail, Bundaberg, Queensland, 30 April 1988

'The kids will love it (Peter & Pompey), the camera work is a treat, and the performances are eminently watchable.' The Sunday Observer, Melbourne, 27 March 1988

'The first of six telemovies, Peter & Pompey, showed clearly that the ability to make decent family entertainment has not been lost … Enchanting. That would be the word to describe the first telemovie in the series.' Townsville Bulletin, Queensland, 29 March 1988

'Princess Kate, well produced and scripted is filled with lovely moments that will touch a nerve in many viewers' The Sun-Herald, Sydney, 3 April 1988

'It (Captain Johnno) is a great kids yarn but also has elements which should keep adults thoroughly entertained as well…there is a moral to the story but like the other telemovies in the series, the message is delivered subtly and wound up in the story.' The Daily Telegraph, Sydney, 11 April 1988

== Sources ==
- http://www.memorabletv.com/episodeguides/touchthesun.htm (now unavailable; archived at https://web.archive.org/web/20120329135753/http://www.memorabletv.com/episodeguides/touchthesun.htm)
- Harrison, Tony The Australian Film and Television Companion Simon & Schuster Australia ISBN 0-7318-0455-4
- leaflet supplied with Captain Johnno VHS

== See also ==
- Winners (Australian TV series)
