= Patricia Edgar =

Australian writer

Patricia Edgar AM
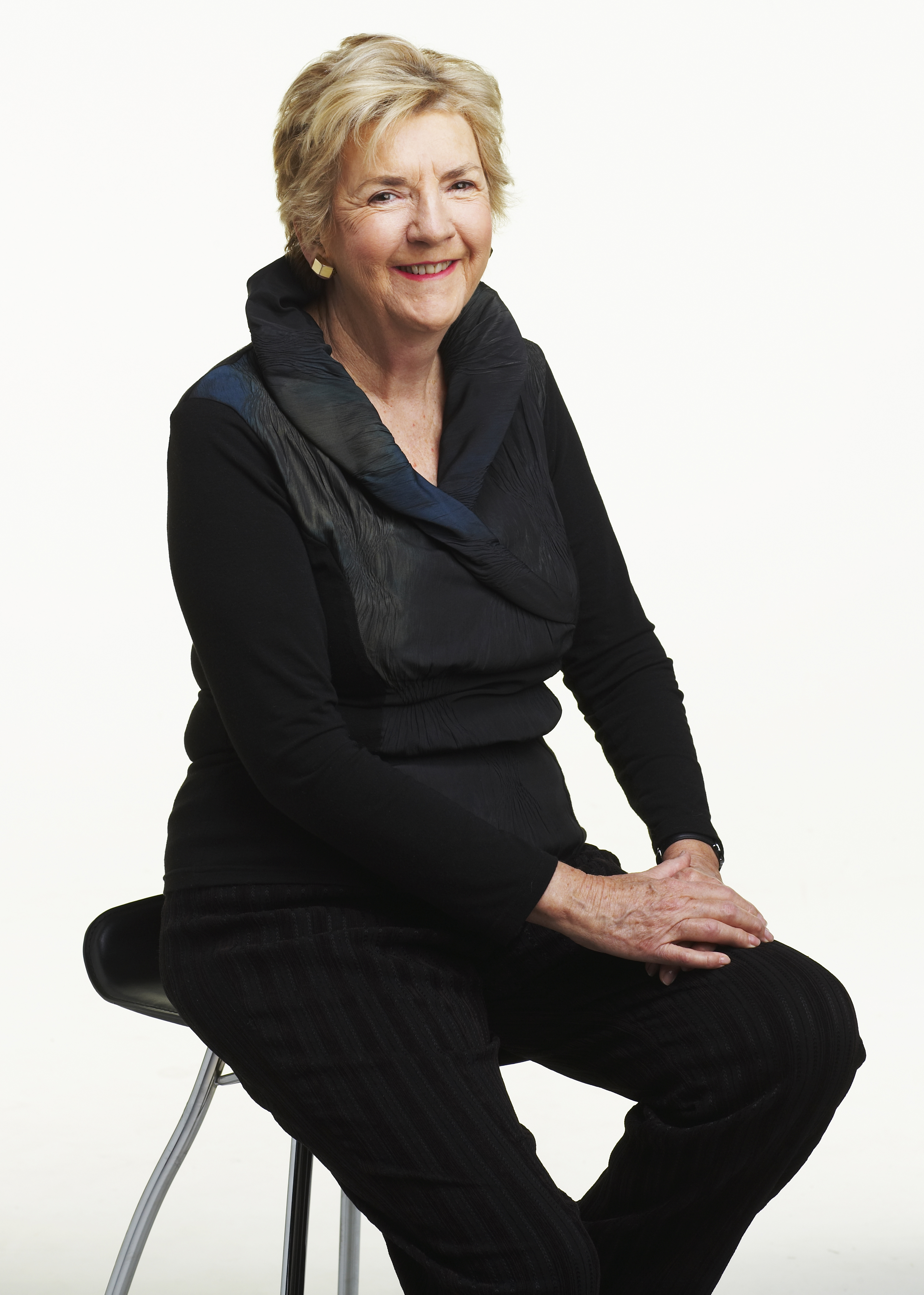
- Edgar in 2008
- Born: Patricia May Edgar; Mildura, Victoria, Australia
- Education: Stanford University, La Trobe University, The University of Melbourne
- Occupations: Author; television producer; educator; media scholar
- Spouse: Don Edgar
- Children: 2

Patricia May Edgar AM is an Australian author, television producer, educator and media scholar, best known as the founding director of the Australian Children's Television Foundation.

== Early life and education ==
Edgar was born in Mildura, Victoria, and moved to California in the 1960s with her husband, author and social researcher Don Edgar, and their two children to study for an MA in Communication at Stanford University. On their return to Australia, Edgar joined the staff of La Trobe University as the inaugural Head of the Centre for the Study of Media and Communication.

She has a BA and a BEd from the University of Melbourne, a Master of Arts from Stanford University, and a PhD from La Trobe University.

She introduced the first courses on film and television production and cinema studies at an Australian university. At La Trobe she also completed a PhD.

== Career ==
Edgar served on several government committees, such as the Australian Broadcasting Control Board which she was appointed to by Gough Whitlam's government in 1975. Whilst part of this committee she was instrumental in formulating codes for children's television for the first time. She was also involved in the Australian National Commission of UNESCO, Film Victoria, the Council of the Australian Film and Television School, the Victorian Government's Board of CIRCIT Ltd (Centre for International Research on Communication and Information Technologies) and the Victorian Post-Secondary Education Commission. Edgar also served as an Associate Member of the Australian Broadcasting Tribunal's Inquiry into Violence on Television from 1988 to 1989.

Egar was deputy chair of the Australian Film Finance Corporation between 1988 and 1995. She also chaired the ACMI Foundation from 2004 to 2006, and is the founding chair of the Breast Cancer Network of Australia, of which she served as chair from 1998 to 2009.

She was the founding director of the Australian Children's Television Foundation (ACTF). Over twenty years, the ACTF produced 174 hours of television drama and won more than 100 national and international awards including an International Emmy, two Logies, four AFI Awards, a Japan Prize, a Banff Rockie Award, the Prix Jeunesse and a Grand Jury Prize. The ACTF also made co-productions with the BBC, Disney, and Revcom. While she was director of the ACTF she produced a number of acclaimed children's television programs for all ages, which included Round the Twist, Lift Off, The Genie from Down Under, Touch the Sun, Winners, Kaboodle, Crash Zone, Li'l Elvis and the Truckstoppers, Noah and Saskia, Yolngu Boy, and Kahootz.

In 1995 she formed and hosted the first World Summit on Television and Children. This summit was held in Melbourne, Australia and was attended by more than 600 delegates from 70 countries around the world. She is currently deputy chair of the World Summit on media for Children Foundation, but served as chair for seventeen years.

Recently, she became an ambassador for the National Ageing Research Institute.

== Publications ==
Edgar is the author of many books. Much of her research and writing has focused on children and television. Her books about television and the media include Children and Screen Violence, Under Five in Australia, Media She (with Hilary McPhee), The Politics of the Press and recently a memoir Bloodbath: A Memoir of Australian Television, which prompted Phillip Adams to write "I would regard Patricia Edgar as a sort of human tank. Patricia is a sort of Centurion in her abilities to kick down doors and push walls over. She is annoying, irritating, relentless, drives people mad, but she gets things done".

=== Books ===
- Australia and Her Northern Neighbours, Don Edgar and Patricia Edgar, Halls, 1974 ISBN 9780582689589
- Under 5 in Australia, Don Edgar, Patricia Edgar and others, Heinemann, 1973 ISBN 0-85561-030-1
- Media She, Patricia Edgar and Hilary McPhee, Heinemann, 1974 ISBN 0-85561-034-4
- Children and Screen Violence, Patricia Edgar, Queensland University Press, 1977 ISBN 0-7022-1403-5
- The Politics of the Press, Patricia Edgar, Sun Books, 1979 ISBN 0-7251-0338-8
- The News In Focus: the Journalism of Exception, Patricia Edgar, Macmillan, 1980 ISBN 0-333-29930-2
- Communication Policy in Developed Countries, Patricia Edgar and Syed Rahim (eds), Routledge and Kegan Paul, 1983 ISBN 9780710300607
- Janet Holmes a Court, Patricia Edgar, 1999, Harper Collins ISBN 0-7322-5715-8
- Bloodbath: A Memoir of Australian Television, Patricia Edgar, Melbourne University Press, 2006 ISBN 978-0-522-85281-3
- The New Child : In Search of Smarter Grown-Ups, Patricia Edgar and Don Edgar, Wilkinson Publishing, 2008 ISBN 978-1-921332-41-8
- The Fairies of Plant Street, Patricia Edgar and Don Edgar, Edgar Publishing, 2012
- Big Fat Porkies and Little White Lies, Patricia Edgar and Ace Buck, Edgar Publishing, 2013 ISBN 978-0987335913
- In Praise of Ageing, Patricia Edgar, Text Publishing, 2013 ISBN 9781922147554
- Peak: Reinventing Middle Age, Patricia Edgar and Don Edgar, Text Publishing, 2017 ISBN 9781925410334
- Kids: Technology and the Future, Patricia Edgar, Australian Book Marketing, 2019

=== Reports ===
- Families Without Television, Patricia Edgar and Ray Crooke, Centre for the Study of Educational Communication and Media, LaTrobe University, 1976 ISBN 0-85816-093-5
- Television License Hearings Go Public: a case study, Patricia Edgar, Centre for the Study of Educational Communication and Media, LaTrobe University, 1981 ISBN 0-85816-282-2
- Children and Television: policy implications, Patricia Edgar, Australian Children's Television Foundation, 1983. ISBN 0-86421-000-0
- Children's Television: the case for regulation, Patricia Edgar, Australian Children's Television Foundation,1984 ISBN 0-86421-048-5

=== Further Selected Publications ===
- The Unknown Audience, Patricia Edgar and Ursula Callus, Centre for the Study of Educational Communication and Media, 1979
- Sex Type Socialization and television Family Comedy Programmes, Patricia Edgar, Centre for the Study of Educational Communication and Media
- A Survey of Audio Visual Facilities in Universities in the USA, Edgar was the producer, executive producer, and director of many children's television shows and documentaries in the late 20th century.Canada, United Kingdom and Australia, Patricia Edgar, Centre for the Study of Educational Communication and Media

== Screenography ==
Title	Year	Crew	Production
Got At Documentary short	1972	Producer	documentary
Nah… He Was in a Big House Before Documentary short	1972	Producer	documentary
My Way Documentary short	1972	Produce, Director	documentary
It’s Just Something Kids Do Documentary short	1972	Producer, Director, Writer	documentary
It’s a Nice Place to Be	1973	Producer, Director, Writer	documentary
ERA	1973	Producer	documentary
You’ve Got to Work for It	1974	Producer	documentary
Mexico ‘75	1975	Producer, Director, Writer	documentary
Winners 8 telemovies including: Quest Beyond Time, Just Friends, On Loan, Top Kid, Room to Move, The Paper Boy, The Other Facts of Life	1985	Executive Producer	TV program
Kaboodle Series 1-2, 1986, 1988-89	1986	Executive Producer	TV program
Seen But Not Heard	1987	Executive Producer	TV program
Touch the Sun 6 telemovies: Captain Johnno, Peter & Pompey, The Gift, Top Enders, Princess Kate, Devil’s Hill	1988	Executive Producer	TV program
The Greatest Tune on Earth 1988-89	1988	Executive Producer	TV program
Round the Twist Series 1-4, 1989-2001	1989	Executive Producer, Producer	TV program
Sky Trackers Telemovie	1990	Executive Producer	TV program
More Winners 6 telemovies including: The Big Wish, Boy Soldiers, Mr Edmund, The Journey, His Master’s Ghost	1990	Executive Producer	TV program
Lift Off Series 1-2, 1991-94	1991	Executive Producer, Producer	TV program
Songs of Innocence	1992	Executive Producer, Producer	documentary
Sky Trackers	1993	Executive Producer, Producer	TV program
First Day	1995	Executive Producer, Producer	documentary
The Genie from Down Under Series 1-2, 1995-98	1995	Executive Producer, Producer	TV program
Li’l Elvis and the Truckstoppers	1996	Executive Producer, Producer	TV program
Kahootz 1996-2002	1996	Executive Producer, Producer	TV program
Crash Zone Series 1-2	1998	Executive Producer, Producer	TV program
Yolngu Boy	2000	Executive Producer, Producer	feature
I Think…	2000	Producer	documentary
Legacy of the Silver Shadow	2002	Executive Producer, Producer	TV program
Noah and Saskia	2004	Executive Producer, Producer	TV program

== Recognition and honours ==
- In 1994 the University of Western Australia awarded her an honorary Doctor of Letters (Hon DLitt). In May of 2018, LaTrobe University awarded her a Doctor of Letters (honoris causa).
- In 1986, she was appointed Member of the Order of Australia for her services to children's television and the media.
- In 1988, she was a finalist at the Bicentennial BHP Awards for the Pursuit of Excellence.
- In 1992 on World Communications Day she was given the Award of the Archbishop of Sydney Citation.
- Finalist in the Victorian of the Year Awards for 1995. In the same year, she was awarded for her outstanding contribution to children at the World Summit on Television and Children.
- In 1996, she was given the Award of the Archbishop of Sydney Citation.
- She was awarded the Australian College of Education medal in 1998 and an Achiever Award from the Committee for Melbourne in 2001. She received both of these awards as recognition for her exceptional contribution to using the medium of television as a form of education.
- In 2001, the ACTF was awarded the Youth TV Prize at the 18th International Scientific Audio-visual Conference - Image and Science in Paris as recognition for the quality of work the ACTF had produced.
- Edgar was named on the Victorian Honour Roll of Women, which recognises women of achievement that have made a difference in Victoria or internationally.
- In 2002, the Australian Film Institute presented her with the Australian Film Institute Longford Life Achievement Award, the highest accolade the AFI can bestow.
- In 2003, the Governor General awarded her with the Centenary Medal to mark her contribution "to children's television education programs".
- In 2007, she was awarded the Dromkeen Medal for her role in advancing children's literature.
