= Don Edgar =

Dr. Donald E. Edgar OAM (1936 - 5 November 2026) was the Foundation Director of the Australian Institute of Family Studies. Under his leadership the Institute had a profound influence on the Government of Australia regarding family policy, family and work, welfare policy and family law.

Edgar was widely recognised for his contributions to family studies and social policy in Australia. Following his tenure at AIFS, he continued to contribute to public debate through consulting, writing, and commentary in Australian media, including The Age and The Australian. He published extensively on social topics on the John Menadue Pearls and Irriations website. Many of these were co-authored with his wife, Patricia Edgar.

== Career ==
Edgar had been professor in sociology and education at the University of Chicago, reader (assistant professor) in Sociology at La Trobe University and adjunct professor with RMIT University's Centre for Workplace Culture Change. He was a member of the Victorian Children's Council, and was an Ambassador for NARI, the National Ageing Research Institute.

His topics of interest included:

- Australian national identity in a globalised world
- Business partnerships and community networks
- Children, schools and the knowledge economy
- Men as fathers and managing work-family responsibilities
- The changing nature of community, family and work
- Ageing and ageing policy

Edgar was awarded the Medal of the Order of Australia (OAM) in the 2010 Queen's Birthday Honours.

== Publications ==
- Art for the Country: The story of Victoria's regional art galleries, Australian Scholarly Publishing, 2019
- PEAK: Reinventing middle age, co-authored with Patricia Edgar, Text Publishing, 2017
- The New Child: In search of smarter grown-ups, co-authored with Patricia Edgar, Wilkinson Publishing, 2008
- War over work: the future of work and family, 2005, Melbourne University Press
- The Patchwork Country: Rethinking Government, Rebuilding Community, Harper Collins, 2001
- Promoting the positive: family-community resourcing as a model for family services, 1999
- Men, Mateship, Marriage, 1997, Harper Collins
- Ageing, everybody's future, 1991
- Seen but not heard: eye-opening insights into the lives of young, 1989
- Australian families and their children: a new and challenging audience, c1985
- Possible directions for an Australian family policy, 1980
- Introduction to Australian society: a sociological perspective, 1980, Prentice-Hall
- Possible directions for an Australian family policy, 1980
- Defining rural schools disadvantage 2: collected papers on rural education, 1979
- Social class differences and the structure of education, 1976
- Schools Commission and rural disadvantage, 1975
- Preparing teachers for change, 1975
- Adolescent competence and sexual disadvantage, 1974
- Competence for girls?, 1972
- Examination marks: their use and interpretation, 1964, Hall's
- School organization and colleague relationship, nd

Australia and Her Northern Neighbours, Hall's, 1962

=== Jointly ===
- The New Child: In search of smarter grownups, 2008, with Patricia Edgar, Wilkinson Publishing
- ' PEAK: Reinventing middle age', with Patricia Edgar, Text Publishing, 2017
- Today's child care, tomorrow's children!, with Gay Ochiltree, c1995, AIFS
- Songs of innocence: a child's view of family life: a discussion paper and study guide, with Annemaree O'Brien, c1994, ACTF
- Family-friendly front: a review of Australian and international work and family research, with Kate Spearritt, 1994
- Families in the 1990s: a challenge for future policy approaches (background paper prepared by Don Edgar and staff of the Australian Institute of Family Studies for the Social Policy Directorate), 1993
- Introduction to Australian society, with Leon Earle, Rodney Fopp, c1993, Prentice-Hall
- Family change and early childhood development, with Gay Ochiltree, 1983, AIFS
- Children's participation in divorce, with Margaret Harrison, c1983, AIFS
- One-parent families and educational disadvantage, with Freya Headlam, c1982, AIFS
- Family change and early childhood development, with Gay Ochiltree, 1982, AIFS
- Changing face of childhood, with Gay Ochiltree, c1981, AIFS
- Family and the pre-school child, with Gay Ochiltree, 1980, AIFS
- First year out teaching with Patricia Edgar and Dave McRae, 1973
- 'The New Child: In search of smarter grown-ups', with Patricia Edgar, Wilkinson 2008

=== Editor ===
- Competent teacher, edited by Donald E. Edgar, 1974, Angus & Robertson
- Social change in Australia: readings in sociology, ed Don Edgar, 1974, Cheshire
- Sociology of Australian education: a book of readings, editor, 1975, McGraw Hill
