= Australian Children's Television Foundation =

Non-profit children's media organisation

- Abbreviation: ACTF
- Formation: 1982; 44 years ago
- Legal status: Australian non-profit public company limited by guarantee
- Purpose: Support the development and production of, and distribute, high-quality Australian children’s screen content
- Headquarters: Fitzroy, Victoria
- Location: Australia
- Website: www.actf.com.au

The Australian Children's Television Foundation (ACTF) is a national not-for-profit children's media production and policy hub. The ACTF invests in the development and production of Australian children’s screen content, distributes that content around the world and develops resources to support the use of children’s screen content in the classroom. It is an advocate for policies that support the commissioning and production of Australian children’s screen content and for children’s right to access locally produced screen content.

== History ==
The Australian Children’s Television Foundation was established in 1982, with its inaugural Board meeting held 30 March 1982 at the then Victorian Ministry for the Arts on Exhibition Street, Melbourne. The founding director of the Australian Children's Television Foundation, Patricia Edgar AM, was the driving force behind its establishment. As the chair of the Australian Broadcasting Tribunal's Children's Program Committee for five years, enforcing children's program standards and the children's drama quota Edgar argued that quality programs would not be made without a not-for-profit production company creating exemplary programs. Patricia Edgar's arguments caught the attention of the Victorian Minister for the Arts Norman Lacy, who invited her to work with him. They agreed to join forces to promote the proposal for the establishment of an organisation to achieve their shared objectives. Lacy then used his ministerial membership of the Australian Education Council and the Australian Arts Ministers' Conference to initiate the establishment of the Australian Children's Television Foundation. He appointed Edgar to the Arts Ministry staff to steer the project, provided office space and establishment funding, and won the support of NSW Education Minister Paul Landa with whom he co-chaired the early steering committee meetings.

In early 1981, Lacy addressed the Senate Standing Committee on Education and the Arts arguing for the strategic and national importance of a Commonwealth commitment to recurrent funding for the fledgling Foundation. The Senate Standing committee report Children and Television Revisited recommended the establishment of an independent children's television production unit, which was the impetus for the foundation of the ACTF, to be funded by the Australian Government with contributions from state and territory governments.

Lacy's political advocacy and practical support coupled with Edgar's intellectual capacity and lobbying skills eventually won through, but before the ACTF could be established Lacy lost his Parliamentary seat at the election held in 1982. Patricia Edgar then turned her attention to funding support from the Commonwealth Government with the support of Dame Beryl Beaurepaire who was President of the Liberal Party. Ultimately, the ACTF was established with Commonwealth Government support collectively matched by all the state governments except Queensland with Edgar as the inaugural Director. She served in this role for 20 years. Programs produced by the ACTF during her tenure include Winners, Kaboodle, Touch the Sun, Round the Twist, Lift Off, The Genie From Downunder, Sky Trackers, Crash Zone, L'il Elvis Jones and the Truckstoppers, Yolngu Boy, Noah and Saskia and the ground breaking Kahootz. Programs produced during this time won more than 100 national and international awards including an International Emmy Award, the Prix Jeunesse, a Japan Prize, a Banff Rockie Award, a Grand Jury Prize at the New York Festival.

Edgar resigned from the ACTF in June 2002. Jenny Buckland was appointed CEO in July 2002.

Later in 2002, the ACTF changed its focus from a production house model to one where the Foundation works and collaborates with independent producers all over the country, supporting them to make quality Australian children’s content.

Major productions that the ACTF was involved with between 2002 and 2008 included Holly's Heroes, Mortified, Double Trouble (with CAAMA) and two series of Lockie Leonard. Mortified won more national and international awards than any other children's program in FFC history.

All those series were commissioned by commercial broadcasters, as a result of the quotas. The ABC was only commissioning very small amounts of children's drama during those years and most of its shows, other than its in-house productions such as Play School and Behind The News, were imported.

In 2006 the ACTF publicly highlighted the opportunity afforded by the switch to digital television to provide a much better media service for Australian children, calling for the establishment of a dedicated digital public channel for children. Ultimately the ACTF joined forces with the ABC to champion this idea, which received support from the Howard Government during the 2007 Australian election campaign.

Following the election of the Rudd Government, the ACTF and ABC continued championing the idea for a dedicated digital public channel for children, and in April 2008, the ACTF proposed the channel at the 2020 Summit – a national forum held by the Rudd Government in Canberra to shape a long term strategy for Australia’s future.

On 9 April 2009, Prime Minister Kevin Rudd announced that nine ideas from the Summit would be adopted, including the children’s channel. ABC3 was switched on in December 2009.

ABC3 attracted new entrants and original programming ideas. New programs commissioned by the ABC and supported by the ACTF from 2009 include My Place 1 & 2, three series of Dance Academy, several series of Nowhere Boys, three series of Bushwhacked!, and more.

Since 2008, the ACTF has invested in the production of dozens of television series and several feature films, including:

· Wildlife-based adventure series Bushwhacked! (2012)

· Supernatural series and film Nowhere Boys (2013)

· The AACTA Award-winning feature film Paper Planes (2015)

· Little Lunch (2015), the first Australian children’s series filmed in mockumentary format

· Preschool animation Little J & Big Cuz (2017), developed with the Australian Council for Educational Research (ACER) to support the transition to school for Indigenous children and their families and available in 17 Australian First Nations Languages

· DisRupted (2019), three films exploring universal themes through unique perspectives

· Live-action series The Inbestigators (2019)

· Live-action comedy Hardball (2019), which won an International Emmy Award

· The groundbreaking and International Emmy Award-winning series First Day (2020), starring Evie MacDonald, the first transgender actor to play a lead role in any Australian program

· Living history series Are You Tougher Than Your Ancestors?, 2020

· The post-apocalyptic sci-fi series Thalu (2020), with an all Indigenous cast

· Preschool animation Kangaroo Beach (2021)

· Interstellar animation Space Nova (2021)

· Barrumbi Kids (2022), a coming-of-age adventure series set in a remote Northern Territory community

· Live-action political comedy drama The PM’s Daughter (2022)

· More Than This (2022), a gritty YA drama series written by teenagers for teenagers

· Adrenaline-fuelled adventure series MaveriX (2022), which explores the competitive world of motocross

· International Emmy Award-winning factual series Built to Survive (2022)

· The factual series Red Dirt Riders (2021), where kids from Roebourne in Western Australia’s remote Pilbara region cross Ngarluma country on their two- and four-wheelers

· Logie Award-winning teen comedy-horror series Crazy Fun Park (2023)

· Eddie’s Lil’ Homies (2024), an animated preschool series inspired by the book series by AFL legend Eddie Betts

· Family film Windcatcher (2024), the first film made as part of a landmark partnership between the ACTF and Stan

· Knee High Spies (2025), a live-action puppetry hybrid series for preschoolers

· A multi award-winning animated adaptation of Shaun Tan’s anthology Tales from Outer Suburbia (2026)

· Family film Whale Shark Jack (2026), the second film made as part of the ACTF and Stan partnership

· Live-action comedy series Caper Crew

The history of Australian children's television and the ACTF are inextricably linked, with the ACTF playing a pivotal role in supporting distinctively Australian programs, and advocating for the support mechanisms required to produce those programs.

== ACTF Chair and Board ==
The ACTF continues to receive funding from the Commonwealth, which is now the primary funder, as well as contributions from all State and Territory governments (including Queensland).

The ACTF Board comprises a mix of industry leaders, government-appointed representatives, and independent directors who oversee the organisation’s governance, strategic direction, and funding of Australian children’s screen content. One of the most significant contributions to the board has been that of Janet Holmes à Court, who joined in 1983 and served as Chair from 1990 until stepping down in 2022, marking 39 years of service.

As of 2022, Helen Silver serves as Chair of the ACTF Board. The board meets quarterly.

The headquarters of the ACTF are on Smith Street in the Melbourne suburb of Fitzroy.

== Awards ==
Year	Production	Production company	Award	Location	Category
2017	Little Lunch: The Specials	Gristmill	AACTA Awards	Australia	Best Children's Television Series
2017	Little J and Big Cuz	Old Dog Pictures / Ned Lander Media	ATOM Awards	Australia	Best Children's Television Program
2017	Boxwars	Bogan Entertainment Solutions	MIPCOM Junior International Pitching Competition	France	Best Pitch
2017	Little Lunch (Special): The Nightmare Before Graduation	Gristmill	Japan Prize	Japan	Primary Series: Primary (6–12)
2017	Little Lunch (Special): The Halloween Horror Story	Gristmill	Chicago International Children's Film Festival	USA	Professional Jury: First Prize – Best Live Action Television Production
2017	Little Lunch (Special): The Nightmare Before Graduation	Gristmill	US International Film and Video Festival	USA	Best of Festival – Entertainment
2017	Little Lunch (Special): The Nightmare Before Graduation	Gristmill	US International Film and Video Festival	USA	Gold Camera – Children's Entertainment
2017	Little Lunch (Special): The Nightmare Before Graduation	Writer: Robyn Butler	ADG Award	Australia	Esben Storm: Best Direction in a Children's TV or SVOD Drama
2017	Little Lunch (Special): The Nightmare Before Graduation	Gristmill	TV Week Logie	Australia	Most Outstanding Children's Program
2017	Little Lunch App: A Teacher's Guide	ACTF/Essential Media	Kidscreen Award	USA	Best eBook
2016	Bushwhacked! – Series 3	Mint Pictures	Chicago International Television Awards	USA	Silver Plaque: Best Children's Series
2016	Bushwhacked! – Series 3	ACTF	Worldfest Houston Remi Awards	USA	Gold Remi – Children's Audience
2016	Little Lunch	Gristmill	Chicago International Children's Film Festival	USA	Children's Jury Prize
2016	Little Lunch	Gristmill	Worldfest Houston Remi Awards	USA	Silver Remi – Children's Audience
2016	Little Lunch	Gristmill	Chicago International Television Awards	USA	Certificate of Merit: Children's Series
2016	Little Lunch App	ACTF	SPA Awards	Australia	Interactive Production
2016	Little Lunch App: A Teacher's Guide	ACTF	ATOM Awards	Australia	Best Educational eBook
2016	Nowhere Boys	Matchbox Pictures	International Emmy Awards	France	Best Kids Series
2016	Nowhere Boys – Series 2	Matchbox Pictures	Kidscreen Awards	USA	Best Non-Animated or Mixed Series
2016	Nowhere Boys – Series 2	Matchbox Pictures	International Emmy Awards	USA	Kids: Series
2016	Ready For This	Blackfella Films/Werner Film Productions	AWGIE Awards	Australia	Children's Category: C Classification
2016	Ready For This	Blackfella Films/Werner Film Productions	Logie Awards	Australia	Most Outstanding Children's Program
2016	Ready For This	Blackfella Films/Werner Film Productions	Worldfest Houston Remi Awards	USA	Bronze Remi – Children's Audience
2015	Bushwhacked! – Series 2	Mint Pictures	Worldfest Houston Remi Awards	USA	Best TV Series – Family/Children
2015	Dance Academy – Series 3	Werner Film Productions	Kidscreen Awards	USA	Best Non-Animated or Mixed Series
2015	Nowhere Boys – Series 1	Matchbox Pictures	Kidscreen Awards	USA	Best New Series
2015	Nowhere Boys – Series 2	Matchbox Pictures	Banff World Media Festival Rockie Awards	Canada	Youth Fiction
2015	Nowhere Boys – Series 2	Matchbox Pictures	Logie Awards	Australia	Best Children's Series
2015	Nowhere Boys: The 5th Boy	Matchbox Pictures	Kidscreen: iKids Awards	USA	Best Website: 6 and Up
2015	The Flamin' Thongs – Episode 2: 'No One Likes A Smart House'	MWP – RDB Thongs	Worldfest Houston Remi Awards	USA	Gold Remi: Best Television Animation
2014	Bushwhacked! – Series 2, Episode 1: 'Whale Shark'	Mint Pictures	Asian Television Awards	Singapore	Best Children's Programme
2014	Bushwhacked! – Series 2, Episode 2: 'Sea Eagle'	Mint Pictures	Wildscreen Panda Awards	UK	High Commendation: Children's Choice Awards
2014	Dance Academy – Series 3	Werner Film Productions	Kidscreen Awards	USA	Best Companion Website
2014	Handball Heroes	Carbon Media	Queensland Reconciliation Awards	Australia	High Commendation: Business
2014	Hoopla Doopla! – Episode 9: 'Snow Business'	Writer: Kym Goldsworthy	AWGIE Awards	Australia	Children's Television: 'P'
2014	Hoopla Doopla! – Episode 6: 'Hiccups'	The Content Agency	Asian Television Awards	Singapore	High Commendation: Best Preschool Programme
2014	MY:24 App	Essential Media and Entertainment	eLearning Awards	Australia	Best Community Resource
2014	Nowhere Boys – Series 1, Episode 3	Writer: Craig Irvin	AWGIE Awards	Australia	Children's Television: 'C'
2014	Nowhere Boys – Series 1	Matchbox Pictures	Logie Awards	Australia	Most Outstanding Children's Drama
2014	Nowhere Boys – Series 1	Matchbox Pictures	Prix Jeunesse International	Germany	International Youth Jury
2014	Nowhere Boys – Series 1	Matchbox Pictures	SPA Awards	Australia	Children's Television Production
2014	Nowhere Boys – Series 1	Matchbox Pictures	Cynopsis Kids !magination Awards	USA	Honorable Mention: Online Interactive Experience
2014	Nowhere Boys – Series 1	Matchbox Pictures	Cynopsis Kids !magination Awards	USA	Honorable Mention: Tweens 9–14 Series/Special
2014	Nowhere Boys – Series 2	Matchbox Pictures	ATOM Awards	Australia	Best Children's Television Program
2014	Paper Planes	Director: Robert Connoly	Cine`festOZ Film Prize	Australia	Film Prize
2014	The Flamin' Thongs – Episode 1 & 20: 'The Boy Who Cried Blowfly' and 'A Fright At The Opera'	MWP – RDB Thongs	AACTA Awards	Australia	Best Children's Television Series
2014	The Flamin' Thongs – Episode 2: 'No One Likes A Smart House'	MWP – RDB Thongs	Asian Television Awards	Singapore	Best 2D Animated Programme
2013	Bushwhacked! – Series 1	Mint Pictures	Chicago International Children's Film Festival	USA	Children's Series
2013	Dance Academy – Series 2	Werner Film Productions	Kidscreen Awards	USA	Best Companion Website
2013	Dance Academy – Series 2	Werner Film Productions	Chicago International Children's Film Festival	USA	Gold Plaque: Children's Series
2013	Dukes of Broxstonia – Series 3	Sticky Pictures	SPAA Awards	Australia	Best Children's Television Production
2013	Flea-bitten!	Moody Street Kids	APRA/AGSC Awards	Australia	Best Music for Children's Television
2013	You're Skitting Me – Series 1	Jigsaw Entertainment	Chicago International Children's Film Festival	USA	Certificate of Merit: Sketch Comedy Series
2012	Dance Academy – Series 2	Werner Film Productions	Asian Television Awards	Asia	High Commendation: Best Children's Programme
2012	Dancing Down Under	Wild Fury	ATOM Awards	Australia	Best Children's Factual Television Program
2012	Flea-bitten! Episode 52: 'Home Truths'	Writer: Ray Boseley	AWGIE Awards	Australia	Best Animation Script
2012	Language of Belonging: Wadu Matyidi	ACTF	ATOM Awards	Australia	Best Indigenous Resource
2012	Language of Belonging: Wadu Matyidi	ACTF	ATOM Awards	Australia	Best Primary Education Resource
2012	My Place – Series 2	Matchbox Pictures	ATOM Awards	Australia	Best Children's Fiction Television Program
2012	My Place – Series 2	Matchbox Pictures	Kidscreen Awards	USA	Best Non-Animated or Mixed Series
2011	Dance Academy – Series 1	Werner Film Productions	Kidscreen Awards	USA	Best Companion Website
2011	Dance Academy – Series 1	Werner Film Productions	Logie Awards	Australia	Most Outstanding Children's Program
2011	Dance Academy – Series 1	Werner Film Productions	New York Festival	USA	Bronze World Medal: Children's/Youth Program
2011	Dance Academy – Series 1	Werner Film Productions	Chicago International Film Festival: The Hugo Television Awards	USA	Gold Plaque: Best Children's Series
2011	Horace In Slow Motion – Series 1	Boombada	Best Shorts Competition	USA	Best of Show: Children/Family Programming
2011	Lockie Leonard – Series 2	Goalpoast Pictures	AIMIA Awards	Australia	Best Cross Platform
2011	My Place – Series 1	Matchbox Pictures	Kidscreen Awards	USA	Best Non-Animated or Mixed Series
2011	My Place – Series 2	Matchbox Pictures	Asian Television Awards	Asia	Best Children's Programme
2011	My Place – Series 2, Episode 1: '1878: Henry'	Matchbox Pictures	Asian Television Awards	Asia	Best Children's Programme
2011	My Place – Series 2, Episode 2: '1868: Minna'	Writer: Nicholas Parsons	AWGIE Awards	Australia	Children's Television: C Classification
2010	My Place – Series 1	Matchbox Pictures	AFI Awards	Australia	Best Children's Drama
2010	My Place – Series 1	Matchbox Pictures	ATOM Awards	Australia	Best Children's Production
2010	My Place – Series 1	Matchbox Pictures	Logie Awards	Australia	Most Outstanding Children's Program
2008	Lockie Leonard – Series 1	Goalpoast Pictures	ATOM Awards	Australia	Best Children's Fiction Television Program
2008	Lockie Leonard – Series 1	Goalpoast Pictures	ATOM Awards	Australia	Best Secondary Education Resource
2008	Lockie Leonard – Series 1	Goalpoast Pictures	Logie Awards	Australia	Most Outstanding Children's Program
2008	Mortified: Episodes 1,6,16 and 19: 'Taylor's DNA', 'The Talk', 'D.J Taylor' and 'The Wedding'	ACTF/Enjoy Entertainment	Cairo International Film Festival	Egypt	Children's Arbitration Committee: Best Televised Program
2008	Mortified	ACTF/Enjoy Entertainment	Prix Jeunesse Festival	Germany	Theme Prize: Gender
2008	Mortified	ACTF/Enjoy Entertainment	Cairo International Film Festival	Egypt	Bronze: Best Televised Program
2007	Double Trouble: Episode 7: 'Lost in the Desert'	Writer: Danielle MacLean	AWGIE Awards	Australia	Best Children's C Classification Script
2007	I Got a Rocket	Mike Young Productions/SLR Productions	International Emmy Awards	USA	New Approaches – Daytime Children's
2007	Lockie Leonard – Series 1	Goalpoast Pictures	AFI Awards	Australia	Best Children's Television Drama
2007	Lockie Leonard – Series 1	Goalpoast Pictures	Chicago International Film Festival: The Hugo Television Awards	USA	Silver: Adult Jury Prize
2007	Mortified	Actor: Marny Kennedy	Golden Chest Awards	Bulgaria	Best Child's Role
2007	Mortified	ACTF/Enjoy Entertainment	Golden Chest Awards	Bulgaria	Bronze: Special Prize for Children's Series
2007	Mortified	ACTF/Enjoy Entertainment	New York Festival	USA	Grand Award: Best Youth Program
2007	Mortified	ACTF/Enjoy Entertainment	New York Festival	USA	Gold Medal: International Programming and Promotion of Youth: Ages 7–12
2007	Mortified	ACTF/Enjoy Entertainment	Seoul Drama Awards	Korea	Best Juvenile Drama
2007	Mortified	ACTF/Enjoy Entertainment	US International Film and Video Festival	USA	Gold Camera Award
2006	Holly's Heroes	Tosi Westside/The Gibson Group	New Zealand Screen Awards	NZ	Best Children's Programme
2006	Mortified	ACTF/Enjoy Entertainment	AFI Awards	Australia	Best Children's Television Series
2006	Mortified	Actor: Marny Kennedy	AFI Awards	Australia	Young Actor Award
2006	Mortified	ACTF/Enjoy Entertainment	ATOM Awards	Australia	Best Children's Television Series
2006	Mortified	ACTF/Enjoy Entertainment	Chicago International Film Festival: The Hugo Television Awards	USA	Children's Live Action Television
2006	Mortified	ACTF/Enjoy Entertainment	Chris Awards	USA	Bronze Plaque: 6 Out of 7 Points
2006	Noah & Saskia	ACTF	New York Festival	Australia	Silver World Medal
2005	Holly's Heroes	Tosi Westside/The Gibson Group	AFI Awards	Australia	Best Children's Drama
2005	Holly's Heroes	Tosi Westside/The Gibson Group	Qantas Television Awards	NZ	Best Children's/Youth Programme
2005	Holly's Heroes	Tosi Westside/The Gibson Group	Chris Awards	USA	Bronze Plaque: 6 Out of 7 Points
2005	Holly's Heroes	Tosi Westside/The Gibson Group	US International Film and Video Festival	USA	Silver Screen Award
2005	Noah & Saskia	ACTF	ATOM Awards	Australia	Best Children's Television Series
2005	Noah & Saskia	ACTF	US International Film and Video Festival	USA	Gold Camera Award
2005	Noah & Saskia CD-ROM	ACTF	ATOM Awards	Australia	Best Secondary Education Resource
2004	Legacy of the Silver Shadow – Episode 1: 'Tomorrow, The World'	ACTF	Chicago International Film Festival: The Hugo Television Awards	USA	Certificate of Merit
2004	Noah & Saskia	ACTF	Chris Awards	USA	Honourable Mention: 5 Out of 7 Rating Points
2004	Noah & Saskia – Episode 9: 'Extra Spicy'	Writer: Sam Caroll	AWGIE Awards	Australia	Best Children's Television Drama (C Classification)
2003	Kahootz	ACTF	Axiem Awards	USA	Silver – Interactive: Children's Category
2003	Kahootz	ACTF	Axiem Awards	USA	Silver – Interactive: Education Category
2003	Legacy of the Silver Shadow	ACTF	Chris Awards	USA	Honourable Mention: 5 Out of 7 Rating Points
2003	Worst Best Friends	CoxKnight Productions	Chris Awards	USA	The Chris Statuette – 7 Out of 7 Rating Points
2003	Yolngu Boy	Yolngu Boy	Festival Cannes – Junior Les Mureaux	France	Audience Prize
2002	Round The Twist – Series 4, Episode 1: 'Welcome Back'	ACTF	Logie Awards	Australia	Most Outstanding Children's Program
2001	Double Trouble – Episode 9: 'Two Dollars'	CAAMA	The Queensland & Northern Territory Awards for Cinematography	Australia	Bronze: Tele Features, Television Drama & Mini Series
2001	Round The Twist – Series 4, Episode 12: 'Skunk Man'	ACTF	Logie Awards	Australia	Most Outstanding Children's Program
2001	Round The Twist – Series 4	ACTF	AWGIE Awards	Australia	Children's Screen & Radio
2001	Yolngu Boy	Actor: John Sebastian Pilakui	AFI Awards	Australia	Best Young Actor's Award
2001	Yolngu Boy	Yolngu Boy	Zanzibar International Film Festival (ZIFF)	Africa	People's Choice Award
2000	Crash Zone – Series 1, Episode 1: 'Dream Team'	ACTF	Chris Awards	USA	Honourable Mention: 5 Out of 7 Rating Points
2000	Kahootz	ACTF	ATOM Awards	Australia	Best Primary Education Resource: Multimedia
2000	Lift Off! – Series 2: I Think...Education Resource	ACTF	ATOM Awards	Australia	Primary Education Resource
2000	Round The Twist	ACTF	World Media Festival	Germany	Website Design – Non-Profit Organisation Website: Intermedia-Globe Silver
2000	Round The Twist – Series 3, Episode 10: 'Tears of Innocence'	ACTF	New York Festival	USA	Grand Jury Prize for Best Show – Youth 7–12
2000	Round The Twist – Series 3, Episode 10: 'Tears of Innocence'	ACTF	New York Festival	USA	Gold World Medal: Youth Category 7–12
2000	Round The Twist – Series 3, Episode 10: 'Tears of Innocence'	ACTF	Chris Awards	USA	Honourable Mention: 5 Out of 7 Rating Points
2000	Round The Twist – Series 3, Episode 3: 'Whirling Derfish'	Writer/Director: Ray Boseley	Banff World Media Festival Rockie Awards	Canada	Children's Program Category
2000	Round The Twist – Series 3, Episode 3: 'Whirling Derfish'	ACTF	New York Festival	USA	Grand Jury Prize for Best Show – Youth 7–12
2000	Round The Twist – Series 3, Episode 3: 'Whirling Derfish'	ACTF	New York Festival	USA	Gold World Medal: Youth Category 7–12
2000	Round The Twist – Series 3, Episode 3: 'Whirling Derfish'	ACTF	Chris Awards	USA	Honourable Mention: 5 Out of 7 Rating Points
2000	Yolngu Boy	Yolngu Boy	Giffoni Film Festival	Italy	Bronze Gryphon Prize: 'Free To Fly'
2000	Yolngu Boy	Production: Brad Shield	Australian Cinematographers Society Awards	Australia	Silver: Cinematography
1999	Crash Zone – Series 1, Episodes 1 & 12: 'The Dream Team' and 'The Shadow'	ACTF	Golden Chest Awards	Bulgaria	Children's Jury Prize
1999	Crash Zone – Series 1, Episodes 1 & 12: 'The Dream Team' and 'The Shadow'	ACTF	Golden Chest Awards	Bulgaria	Special Prize: Drama for Children & Adolescents
1999	Li'l Elvis Jones and the Truckstoppers	ACTF/Viskatoons/France Animation	Itheme Awards	France	Best Animation Broadcast on Cable & Satellite Television
1998	Li'l Elvis Jones and the Truckstoppers: Episode 1: 'Caught in a Trap'	ACTF/Viskatoons/France Animation	Chiarra D'Assisi Children's Television Prize	Italy	Best International Children's Program
1998	Li'l Elvis Jones and the Truckstoppers: Episode 1: 'Caught in a Trap'	ACTF/Viskatoons/France Animation	US International Film & Video Festival	USA	Bronze: Children's Program Category
1998	Li'l Elvis Jones and the Truckstoppers: Episode 1: 'Caught in a Trap'	ACTF/Viskatoons/France Animation	US International Film & Video Festival	USA	Certificate for Creative Excellence
1997	First Day	ACTF	National Educational Media Network Awards	USA	The Silver Apple Award
1997	Lift Off! – Series 2: 'Lift Off! to Fire Safety'	ACTF	Video Fuego	Spain	Honourable Mention
1996	First Day	ACTF	ATOM Awards	Australia	Special Award: Hearthealth Award for Human Development
1996	First Day	ACTF	Chris Awards	USA	Social Issues – Documentary Category
1996	Lift Off! – Series 2	ACTF	Cairo International Film Festival for Children	Egypt	Golden Cairo
1996	Lift Off! – Series 2: 'Lift Off! to Fire Safety'	ACTF	Chris Awards	USA	Honourable Mention: Education & Instruction: Safety Category
1995	Lift Off! – Series 2, Episode 19: 'Heroes'	ACTF	The Japan Prize	Japan	Hoso Bunka Foundation Award for Excellence in Pre-School Programming
1995	Lift Off! – Series 2	ACTF	New York Festival	USA	Bronze: Youth Programming: 7-12 Years
1995	Sky Trackers	ACTF	ATOM Awards	Australia	Best Children's TV Series
1994	Round The Twist – Series 2, Episode 12: 'Little Black Balls'	ACTF	ATOM Awards	Australia	Children's Television Award
1994	Round The Twist – Series 2, Episode 3: 'Little Squirt'	ACTF	ATOM Awards	Australia	Primary Student Judging Panel Award
1994	Round The Twist – Series 2, Episode 3: 'Little Squirt'	ACTF	Prix Jeunesse International	Germany	Fiction: 7-12 Years
1994	Sky Trackers	Actor: Zbych Trofimiuk	AFI Awards	Australia	Best Young Actor's Award
1994	Sky Trackers	ACTF	Cairo International Film Festival	Egypt	Golden Cairo for TV Programs
1994	Sky Trackers – Episode 1: 'Skating The Dish'	ACTF	AFI Awards	Australia	Best Children's Drama
1993	Lift Off! – Series 1	ACTF	TV World Marketing Awards	International	Best Marketing by an Independent
1993	Round The Twist – Series 2, Episode 3: 'Little Squirt'	ACTF	AFI Awards	Australia	Best Children's Drama
1993	Round The Twist – Series 2, Episode 5: 'Nails'	Writers: Paul Jennings & Esben Storm	AWGIE Awards	Australia	Children's Adaptation to Television
1992	Lift Off! – Series 1, Episode 15: 'Something Tells Me'	ACTF	AFI Awards	Australia	Best Children's Television Drama
1992	Lift Off! – Series 1, Episode 1: 'A Load of Old Rubbish'	ACTF	AFI Awards	Australia	Best Children's Television Drama
1992	Lift Off! – Series 1	ACTF	United Nations Association of Australia: Media Peace Awards	Australia	Children's Category
1991	More Winners: Episode 3: 'Boy Soldiers'	ACTF	ATOM Awards	Australia	Highly Commended: General Award – Narrative
1991	More Winners: Episode 2: 'The Big Wish'	ACTF	ATOM Awards	Australia	Highly Commended: Children's Award – Narrative
1991	Round The Twist – Series 1, Episode 9: 'Lucky Lips'	ACTF	ATOM Awards	Australia	General Award – Narrative
1991	Round The Twist – Series 1, Episode 8: 'Wunderpants'	ACTF	AFI Awards	Australia	Best Children's Television Drama
1991	Round The Twist – Series 1, Episodes 9 & 12: 'Lucky Lips' and 'Without My Pants'	ACTF	ATOM Awards	Australia	Children's Award – Narrative
1990	Kaboodle – Series 2	ACTF	Australian Television Society Awards	Australia	Certificate of Merit: Children's Category
1990	Kaboodle – Series 2, Episode 1: 'The Great Hedge Race'	ACTF	ATOM Awards	Australia	Highly Commended: Children's Award in Animation
1990	Kaboodle – Series 1, Episode 1: 'The Great Detective'	Production: Richard Chataway	Australian Cinematographers Society Awards	Australia	Gold: Cinematography
1990	Kaboodle – Series 2, Episode 1: 'The Hedge and Mr. Snip'	ACTF	ATOM Awards	Australia	Highly Commended: Children's Award in Animation
1990	More Winners: Episode 3: 'Boy Soldiers'	Writer: Cliff Green	AWGIE Awards	Australia	Children's Award
1990	More Winners: Episode 3: 'Boy Soldiers'	ACTF	Chicago International Festival of Children's Films	USA	Liv Ullmann Peace Prize
1990	More Winners: Episode 2: 'The Big Wish'	ACTF	Chicago International Festival of Children's Films	USA	Outstanding Humour: Festival Award
1990	Round The Twist – Series 1	Writer: Paul Jennings	AWGIE Awards	Australia	Children's Adaptation to Television
1990	Round The Twist – Series 1	Production: Jan Kenny	Australian Cinematographers Society Awards	Australia	Certificate of Merit: Cinematography
1990	Round The Twist – Series 1, Episode 8: 'Wunderpants'	ACTF	ATOM Awards	Australia	Highly Commended: Children's Award – Narrative
1990	The Greatest Tune on Earth	ACTF	Television Society Awards of Australia	Australia	Certificate of Merit: Children's Program Category
1990	Touch The Sun: Episode 1: 'Captain Johnno'	ACTF	CCTV	China	Children's Television Award
1990	Touch The Sun: Episode 1: 'Captain Johnno'	ACTF	Cinemagic Film Festival	Northern Ireland	Regional Guild of Film Writers
1989	Touch The Sun	ACTF	NSW Children's Week Awards	Australia	Film & Television Award
1989	Touch The Sun: Episode 1: 'Captain Johnno'	ACTF	International Festival for Youth	France	Highly Commended: Grand Jury Prize
1988	Kaboodle – Series 1	ACTF	Australian Television Society Awards	Australia	Award for Excellence: Children's
1988	Kaboodle – Series 1	ACTF	Banff World Media Festival Rockie Awards	Canada	International Children's Variety Program
1988	Kaboodle – Series 1, Episode 1: 'Double Take'	ACTF	ATOM Awards	Australia	Best Narrative in Animation
1988	Touch The Sun	ACTF	Bicentennial Pater Awards	Australia	Australasian Children's Drama Program
1988	Touch The Sun: Episode 1: 'Captain Johnno'	Production: Roger Dowling	Australian Cinematographers Society Awards	Australia	Gold: Cinematography
1988	Touch The Sun: Episode 1: 'Captain Johnno'	Actor: Damien Walters	Australian Television Society Awards	Australia	Award for Excellence – Performance by a Juvenile Actor
1988	Touch The Sun: Episode 1: 'Captain Johnno'	ACTF	International Emmy Awards	USA	Children's & Young People's Category
1988	Touch The Sun: Episode 3: 'Devil's Hill'	ACTF	Chicago International Festival of Children's Films	USA	Live Action Feature Length Videotape
1988	Touch The Sun: Episode 4: 'Peter & Pompey'	ACTF	Australian Television Society Awards	Australia	Award for Excellence – Children's Drama
1988	Touch The Sun: Episode 4: 'Peter & Pompey'	Writer: John Misto	Australian Television Society Awards	Australia	Excellence in Scriptwriting – One-Off Drama or Miniseries
1987	Kaboodle – Series 1, Episode 10: 'The Fogbrook Thing'	Writer: Joshua Crooks	ATOM Awards	Australia	Best Narrative in Animation
1987	Kaboodle – Series 1, Episode 2: 'The Huge Adventures of Trevor a Cat'	ACTF	ATOM Awards	Australia	Best Animation – Tertiary Student
1986	Winners	ACTF	Chicago International Festival of Children's Films	USA	Special Prize for Outstanding Achievements in Developing High Quality Films for Children's Audience
1986	Winners: Episode 2: 'Just Friends'	ACTF	Chicago International Festival of Children's Films	USA	Children's Audience Vote: Most Popular Video
1986	Winners: Episode 4: 'The Paper Boy'	ACTF	Chicago International Festival of Children's Films	USA	Honourable Mention: Live Action
1986	Winners: Episode 5: 'The Other Facts of Life'	ACTF	Chicago International Festival of Children's Films	USA	Special Jury Prize: Cinematic Impact
1986	Winners: Episode 6: 'Top Kid'	ACTF	ATOM Awards	Australia	General Award – Narrative
1986	Winners: Episode 6: 'Top Kid'	ACTF	Chicago International Festival of Children's Films	USA	Live Action
1986	Winners: Episode 6: 'Top Kid'	ACTF	Penguin Awards	Australia	Best Children's Drama
1986	Winners: Episode 7: 'On Loan'	ACTF	ATOM Awards	Australia	Children's Award – Social Issues
1986	Winners: Episode 7: 'On Loan'	ACTF	United Nations Association of Australia: Media Peace Awards	Australia	Citation
1986	Winners: Episode 7: 'On Loan'	ACTF	ATOM Awards	Australia	Highly Commended: General Award – Social Issues
1986	Winners: Episode 7: 'On Loan'	Actor: Quang Chinh Dinh	St Kilda Film Festival	Australia	Certificate of Merit: Acting
1985	Winners: Episode 5: 'The Other Facts of Life'	ACTF	AWGIE Awards	Australia	Children's Category – Original Work
1985	Yolngu Boy	Composer: Bernard Bories	Cannes Junior de Ille Maurice Festival	France	Best Music

== Productions ==
Notable television series developed or assisted by the ACTF include:

- Round the Twist
- Dance Academy
- Mortified
- The Genie From Down Under
- Li'l Elvis Jones and the Truckstoppers
- Worst Year of My Life Again
- Lockie Leonard
- Double Trouble
- Mal.com
- Noah & Saskia
- My Place
- Lift Off
- Johnson and Friends
- Spellbinder (followed by its sequel series Spellbinder: Land of the Dragon Lord)
- Touch The Sun
- Winners
- Yolngu Boy
- You're Skitting Me
- Crash Zone
- Bushwhacked! (followed by its sequel series Bushwhacked! Bugs)
- Flea-bitten!
- Holly's Heroes
- Kaboodle
- Worst Best Friends
- Legacy of the Silver Shadow
- Sky Trackers
- The InBESTigators
- Little Lunch
- The Flamin' Thongs
- Wakkaville
- WAC: World Animal Championships
- Top Enders
- The Gift
- The Dukes of Broxstonia
- Seen But Not Heard
- Ready for This
- Nowhere Boys (followed by its movie Nowhere Boys: The Book of Shadows)
- Little J & Big Cuz
- Hardball
- First Day (followed by its TV series of the same name)
- Escape from Jupiter (followed by its sequel series Return to Jupiter)
- Dancing Down Under
- C/o The Bartons
- Balloon Barnyard
- Mustangs FC
- Wacky World Beaters
- Songs of Innocence
- MY:24
- Desdemoda
- Black Knight White Witch
- Casa De Evil
- Itty Bitty Ditties
- Laser Beak Man
- Mega Bites
- Monster Chef
- My Strange Pet
- The Girl From Tomorrow (followed by its sequel series The Girl from Tomorrow Part II: Tomorrow's End)
- Horace in Slow Motion
- I Got a Rocket
- The Valley Between
- The Greatest Tune On Earth
- Hoopla Doopla!
- Lah-Lah's Adventures
- Waabiny Time
- Animalia
- Cybergirl
- Backyard Science (followed by its sequel series WOW! That's Amazing)
- A Field Guide to Being a 12-Year Old Girl
- The Funny Ones
- My Brother Jack
- Deadly
- Dogstar
- Boxwars
- Handball Heroes
- Language of Belonging
- Australian Rules
- Paper Planes
- Blinky Bill the Movie (followed by its TV series The Wild Adventures of Blinky Bill)
- 100% Wolf (followed by its TV series 100% Wolf: Legend of the Moonstone, and sequel 200% Wolf)
- The Big Wish
- The Unlisted
- DisRupted
- Summer's Day
- Thalu
- Red Dirt Riders
- Are You Tougher Than Your Ancestors?
- Built To Survive
- The PM's Daughter
- Born to Spy
- Planet Lulin
- Kangaroo Beach
- Space Nova
- Plasmo
- Bluey
- Kahootz
