= Crash Zone =

- Genre: Children's science fiction
- Created by: Patricia Edgar; Philip Dalkin; Jeff Peck
- Developed by: Patricia Edgar; Robert Greenberg
- Written by: Robert Greenberg; Pino Amenta; Jeff Peck; Philip Dalkin; Kevin Nemeth; Shane Brennan; Anthony Morris
- Directed by: Esben Storm; Steve Jodrell; Julian McSwiney; Pino Amenta; Ray Boseley
- Starring: Cassandra Magrath; Nikolai Nikolaeff; Paul Pantano; Frances Wang; Damien Bodie; Heidi Valkenburg; Nicki Wendt
- Voices of: Matt Parkinson
- Composers: Chris Neal; Braedy Neal
- Country of origin: Australia
- Original language: English
- No. of series: 2
- No. of episodes: 26

Production
- Executive producer: Patricia Edgar
- Producers: Patricia Edgar; Bernadette O'Mahony
- Production locations: Melbourne, Victoria
- Cinematography: Graeme Wood
- Editors: Peter Carrodus; Stephen Evans; Ralph Strasser
- Running time: 30 minutes
- Production company: Australian Children's Television Foundation

Original release
- Network: Seven Network
- Release: 13 February 1999 – 25 August 2001

Crash Zone is an Australian children's science fiction television series which aired on the Seven Network from 13 February 1999 to 25 August 2001. It was produced by Australian Children's Television Foundation, in association with the Disney Channel, and ran for 26 episodes. The series stars five high school students, "high-tech whiz kids" of varied backgrounds, who are hired by the president of the Catalyst software company to save her failing business. The premise of the series was unique in that it was one of the first series to examine the early use of the internet as well as the video game industry and artificial intelligence.

== Premise ==
Mike Hansen (Nikolai Nikolaeff), Alison "Pi" Renfrey (Cassandra Magrath), Rebecca "Bec" Chan (Frances Wang), Marcello Di Campili (Paul Pantano) and Abraham "Ram" Foley (Damien Bodie) are five Melbourne high school students who all have a strong interest in computers, online gaming and the internet. While playing an online computer game, they each discover a coded message. The message prompts them to follow a series of clues that eventually leads them to a meeting with Alexandra Davis (Nicki Wendt), president of the software company Catalyst.

Confessing that she was the author of the messages, Davis reveals to the teenagers that her company is struggling and she would like to hire one of the teens as game testers in order to design games for her company at "The Crash Zone". Davis proposes a competition in which the winner takes the job, and while the competition is fierce, she is impressed by their teamwork and offers them all positions in the company. The one exception is Ram, who she feels is too young, but who is allowed to remain with the teens. As well as the developing friendships with each other and their social lives, the teenagers also discover Virgil (Matt Parkinson), a mysterious artificial intelligence which exists on the internet.

The second series has the teenagers returning from their summer vacations to find the financial situation at Catalyst to have become much more serious. Davis has been forced to lay off most of her staff and they may be next. Two new characters are introduced in the second series, 12-year-old Penny Gallagher and her father Matthew Gallagher. Penny Gallagher, who is befriended by Ram, persuades her father to offer Davis a deal to save Catalyst from bankruptcy. Although knowing very little about the video game industry, Matthew Gallagher is a very successful businessman and very quickly turns the company around. However, his changes often results in conflict between him and the staff.

== Characters ==
- Alison "Pi" Renfrey (Cassandra Magrath) – The daughter of a highly popular actor and is usually regarded as the richest of the group. She is beautiful, spirited and occasionally rude. In series 2 Pi and Mike start dating.
- Marcello Di Campili (Paul Pantano) – Of Italian ancestry, he has high hopes of becoming super rich one day and often gets into trouble as a result of his various shady dealings. He is lively, humorous and comical.
- Abraham "Ram" Foley (Damien Bodie) – The second youngest of the group but is the most creative and technically intelligent of the group. He remains one of Mike's best friends from the first.
- Rebecca "Bec" Chan (Frances Wang) – Bec is of Chinese descent and is often portrayed as an intelligent, highly successful academic student. She is popular with the Catalyst staff.
- Mike Hansen (Nikolai Nikolaeff) – Mike is probably the oldest of the group and the most successful game designer and tester. He often assumes control of the group when things go wrong. He is also the funniest of the group and is patient and quick-thinking.
- Alexandra Davis (Nicky Wendt) – She is the president of Catalyst.
- Nigel Hartford (Richard Moss) – He is Alexandra's assistant.
- Virgil Reality (Matt Parkinson) – Originally a "Buggy" Artificial intelligence experiment created by Alex when she was working for Sunjim. Virgil was "born" when Alex trashed the AI 2000 program when she couldn't get it to work properly. The remains floated about the internet like a ghost before forming the AI Virgil who spent the next few years wandering the internet before appearing in the Catalyst network server where he met the Crash Zone team and subsequently met his creator Alex. The name 'Virgil' is given to him by Mike.
- Penny Gallagher (Heidi Valkenburg) – She is the youngest of the group at twelve yet she is quick and computer savvy and has produced ingenious creations. She is introduced to Catalyst by Ram.
- Matthew Gallagher (Jeremy Stanford) – He is the father of Penny and a very successful businessman.

== Episodes ==
=== Series One (1999) ===
No. overall	No. in series	Title	Directed by	Written by	Original release date	Prod. code
1	1	"The Dream Team"	Esben Storm	Philip Dalkin	13 February 1999	#1.01
After decoding a secret message on the Internet, five teens are offered the job of a lifetime: beta testers for the game company Catalyst network. Upon arriving they are informed only one of them can be taken and they are given a chance by Alex the company head to prove themselves by designing a new game character for her. The group's teamwork however impresses Alex who hires them all. During the episode the group also encounter a mysterious AI who they name Virgil who has wandered in to the Catalyst server and who existence they decide to keep hidden for now.
2	2	"Identity Crisis"	Ray Boseley	Philip Dalkin	20 February 1999	#1.02
Settling into their jobs, the group runs in trouble when Alex discovers Virgil. Fearing that Virgil is a spy for Rival company Sunjin, Alex tries to get rid of Virgil. Virgil tries to get the kids help even though he cannot remember who he is and his only clue is a fragmented data file. With the kids help in restoring the file it is discovered that Virgil is actually a program called AI200 that Alex tried to get working for Sunjin but scrapped because it was too buggy. Now Virgil has evolved and found his way home.
3	3	"Undercover"	Esben Storm	Philip Dalkin	27 February 1999	#1.03
When Alex's valuable necklace goes missing, every one is suspected and Pi feels obligated to solve the case when people think she is the thief due to her apparent poor background. Virgil still trying to understand human emotions helps Marcello look for his little sister Sam who is lost in the city.
4	4	"Big Business"	Ray Boseley	Max Dann	6 March 1999	#1.04
Marcello tries to make money selling Ram's new invention. Ram, realising Marcello is ripping him off, dissolves the partnership and then sells one of his amazing new video game converter to a strange girl, Louise. Unfortunately Louise's TV blows up and she blames Ram. Will the other kids be able to save Ram before he becomes a meal for Louise's huge dog "Predator"? Meanwhile, Bec's future at Catalyst is uncertain when her father learns she is working there.
5	5	"It's Only Words"	Esben Storm	Anthony Morris	13 March 1999	#1.05
There is tension in the group when Bec believes Mike has made a racist comment towards her putting the whole group on edge. Things are made worse when a dangerous computer virus gets into the Catalyst server threatening the latest game Trillin. With the group not looking like they will make up soon Virgil risks his life to fight the computer virus with Alex's help causing the gang to realise the foolishness of their fight. Fearing they have lost their friend due to their fighting the group is relieved when Virgil reappears a little shaken from the fight but fine all the same.
6	6	"Secrets and Lies"	Pino Amenta	Philip Dalkin	20 March 1999	#1.06
Bec is intrigued and delighted by a "net romance" she is pursuing. The boys are skeptical and their worst fears are realised when they find out it's really Virgil writing love letters to Bec. Pi tries to think of a way to save Bec from the humiliation of finding out she is romancing an artificial intelligence! How can she do this when her own lies are getting her deeper in trouble herself?
7	7	"Truth Hurts"	Ray Boseley	Shane Brennan	27 March 1999	#1.07
Pi and Bec are asked by Alex to design a game to appeal to girls. The game, "Boyfriends" is about the trials and tribulations of teenage love. The trouble is Bec and Pi have very different ideas about what it means to be a girl. The game is a mess and when Mike tries to use it to bring his separated parents closer, everyone realizes they have got a lot to learn about emotions and life.
8	8	"No News Is Good News"	Pino Amenta	Kevin Nemeth	3 April 1999	#1.08
The kids are alone at Catalyst and having a great time when Kimberley arrives. She is a news reporter, there to do a story on the testers. Mike is flattered but the other kids begin to suspect she's a spy. Pi finally succeeds in getting rid of Kimberley only to find her own mother has tracked her to Catalyst. Pi is unmasked. Now everybody knows she's really a rich kid with a famous father and not a street kid at all!
9	9	"Birthday"	Esben Storm	Kevin Nemeth	10 April 1999	#1.09
Marcello's unemployed father is acting strangely and Marcello becomes convinced his father is going to kill himself. Meanwhile, Bec has created her own game about gnomes. The kids, confused by Pi's depression, Bec's game and Marcello's weirdness, are unsure exactly who is really cracking up.
10	10	"Leap of Faith"	Pino Amenta	Kevin Nemeth & Philip Dakin	17 April 1999	#1.10
Leo Moore arrives at Catalyst with a game he has invented and Alex is very keen to put money into it. Mike smells a rat, and not just because Leo seems to be attracted to Pi. When Mike realises Leo's stolen the game, he combines with Pi to save Alex from embarrassment. This brings Mike and Pi closer together, they kissed which surprises them both.
11	11	"Heroes"	Ray Boseley	Kevin Nemeth	24 April 1999	#1.11
Marcello feels rejected when Alex dismisses his idea for a video game based on Virgil. Mike too is deflated when he finds that his hero, Stig MacAllister, creator of his favourite comic, is rude and aggressive. Tempted by an offer from Sunijim representative Brad Kane, Marcello eventually realises Brad is an even bigger scammer than himself.
12	12	"The Shadow"	Pino Amenta	Anthony Morris	1 May 1999	#1.12
Marcello throws Catalyst into uproar when he uses Virgil to hack into Alex's system in search of the phone number for Alex's famous father. Alex brings in legendary hacker-tracker J.D. Moon to find the security breach. Marcello is too scared to own up to his foolishness and as J.D. Moon gets closer to the truth, the kids have to choose whether to help Marcello or not. When Alex discovers the truth, she fires Marcello!
13	13	"The Outsider"	Stephen Johnson	Philip Dakin	8 May 1999	#1.13
When Virgil goes missing after confiding in Ram, it's obvious to the kids that Sunijim have somehow captured him. Marcello sees this as a way to redeem himself in Alex's eyes and, with his friends help, infiltrates Sunijim in an attempt to rescue Virgil from Brad Kane. When Marcello gets into difficulties, the team use all their computer skills to save Marcello and Virgil, reuniting the Crash Zone team

=== Series Two (2001) ===
No. overall	No. in series	Title	Directed by	Written by	Original release date	Prod. code
14	1	"Something New"	David Swann	Philip Dalkin	2 June 2001	#2.01
The kids are stunned to find that Catalyst is on the brink of financial ruin. How can they save the company when they've just offended the only potential investor, Matthew Gallagher? The kids find an electronic solution.
15	2	"It's an Art"	Ray Boseley	Jeff Peck & Philip Dalkin	9 June 2001	#2.02
Inventor Phil Godwin brings his radical new 3-D glasses to Catalyst. Alex convinces him that Catalyst has the perfect game to showcase them to the world. Only, which game?
16	3	"Free Stuff"	Julian McSwiney	Jeff Peck	16 June 2001	#2.03
The lure of a program that can automatically order all the free stuff from the web is Marcello's latest brainwave. But when it goes horribly wrong it threatens everyone's future.
17	4	"Solidarity"	David Swann	Jeff Peck	23 June 2001	#2.04
The kids are torn between their principles and Alex when they go on strike for better conditions but their actions threaten the launch of Alex's latest game.
18	5	"Games People Play"	Ray Boseley	Jeff Peck	30 June 2001	#2.05
Depressed at breaking up with Pi, Mike is drawn into playing a violent game on the Net. The fun suddenly stops when his nemesis, Damon, starts to pursue him in the real world.
19	6	"Your Cheating Heart"	Ray Boseley	Susan Macgillicuddy	7 July 2001	#2.06
Marcello uses a cheat site to help him beat Bec in a school essay contest. She's highly offended – is this going to be the end of Marcello's friendship with the others?
20	7	"Basketball Diaries"	Julian McSwiney	Susan Macgillicuddy	14 July 2001	#2.07
Bec returns from America feeling cocky and full of herself. This becomes a liability when the others try to save Virgil who has escaped from Catalyst inside Matthew Gallagher's laptop.
21	8	"Who Wants to Be a Millionaire?"	Julian McSwiney	Susan Macgillicuddy	21 July 2001	#2.08
Finally one of Marcello's schemes works! His virtual band is a huge hit on the Net and he becomes, on paper, a millionaire! But is it all it's cracked up to be? Meanwhile, Alex asks Vinnie to become the new face of Nemo, the star of Catalyst's new game.
22	9	"Sabertooth"	Steve Jodrell	Philip Dalkin	28 July 2001	#2.09
Famous hacker Sabertooth steals Alex's new hologram game and Catalyst's future looks grim. When Marcello realises that Sabertooth is someone he knows, he's got difficult decisions to make.
23	10	"Walkabout"	David Swann	Philip Dalkin	4 August 2001	#2.10
Virgil jumps inside a robotic body and runs away from Catalyst. The kids are frantic. How do they find him and convince him to return before Alex finds out he is gone?
24	11	"Men in Khaki"	Steve Jodrell	Pino Amenta, Philip Dalkin & Jeff Peck	11 August 2001	#2.11
Army Intelligence raid the offices of Catalyst and they're after one thing – the Artificial Intelligence, Virgil. How can our heroes save Virgil from being conscripted?
25	12	"Skin Deep"	David Swann	Chris Anastassiades	18 August 2001	#2.12
Pi discovers her film star father is exploiting his daughter on the Net from publicity purposes. She's livid and decides the time has come to tell him just how she feels.
26	13	"Rear Windows"	Steve Jodrell	Philip Dalkin	25 August 2001	#2.13
A game Ram has successfully conquered on the net turns out to be the blueprint for a real life kidnapping. The team, distracted by the most important day of their careers, must stop a band of criminals from using Ram's strategy.

== Reception ==
The series was the first collaboration with the Australian Children's Television Foundation and the Disney Channel. It proved a very successful show and eventually aired in Canada, Sri Lanka the United Kingdom as well. The series was nominated for several awards including the Australian Film Institute Awards, Prix Jeunesse and the New York Film Festival. It was also given honorable mention at The Chris Awards and was an official selection at the Prix Danube, the Chicago International Children's Film Festival and The Museum of Television and Radio.

In 1999, series producer Patricia Edgar was nominated by the Australian Film Institute for "Best Children's Television Drama", specifically its first episode "The Dream Team". Esben Storm was also nominated for "Best Direction in a Television Drama" for directing its first episode. Edgar was again nominated to receive "Best Children's Television Drama", along with Bernadette O'Mahony, for their work on the episode "Skin Deep" in 2001. It was also nominated for Most Outstanding Children's Program at the 2001 and 2002 Logie Awards.

A novel based on the series was written by Amanda Midlam and released in 2001.
