= Kaboodle =

- Genre: Anthology series
- Country of origin: Australia
- Original language: English
- No. of seasons: 2
- No. of episodes: 19

Production
- Executive producer: Patricia Edgar
- Producers: Patricia Edgar and Jeff Peck
- Running time: 30 minutes

Original release
- Network: ABC
- Release: 26 October 1987 – 7 June 1991

Kaboodle is a 13-part Australian anthology children's television series which includes animation, puppetry, and live-action and was produced by the Australian Children's Television Foundation that ran on ABC Television from 1987 to 1990. Kaboodle 2 was a follow-on series which provided another six half-hour episodes of innovative television drama for the under-tens. Kaboodle 2, however, was fully animated and instead of being an ‘anthology’ series of many short dramas, all of which are different, this season had regular characters in every episode. The show commenced screening on the Seven Network across Australia in April 1990.

The original concept was conceived by Jenny Hooks and the series aimed to provide quality Australian television drama for the long neglected 6 to 9-year-old age group. The series intended to stimulate young children’s imagination and widen their range of experiences. Some of the stories are based on distinguished Australian children’s books, some on fairy tales and myths, whilst others have been developed as wholly original work for Kaboodle. The make-believe of television drama, where anything can and should happen, was well suited to foster healthy, emotional and intellectual growth by challenging the imagination and widening the range of children's experience.

Kaboodle is significant not only because it catered to a much neglected audience but also because the series provided industry experience and international screen credit for numerous talented up-and-coming Australian film-makers. More than one hundred crew who worked on Kaboodle gained their first television credit or advanced their careers by working on the series. The series was distributed outside Australia and New Zealand by London and New York based Richard Price Television Associates Limited. Kaboodle video cassettes were marketed in Australia by CBS/FOX Video.

== Crew ==
=== Kaboodle ===
- Executive Producer: Patricia Edgar
- Series Producer: Jeff Peck
- Concept: Jennifer Hooks
- Producers
  - Robert Alcock
  - Richard Chataway
  - Colleen Clarke
  - Michael Cusack
  - Gary Davis
  - John Griffin
  - Jenifer Hooks
  - Peita Letchford
  - Tony Llewellyn-Jones
  - John Morris
  - Heather Ogilvie
  - Mark Osborn
  - David Rapsey
  - Penny Robins
  - Neil Robinson
  - Michael Szmanski
  - Peter Viska
  - Michael Webb
  - Timothy White
  - Stephanie Wiessner
  - Vincent C. Zimbardi
- Directors
  - Robert Alcock
  - Karin Altmann
  - Sue Brooks
  - Catherine Campbell
  - Richard Chataway
  - Paul Cox
  - Michael Cusack
  - Gary Davis
  - Jessica Douglas-Henry
  - Steve French
  - Maggie Geddes
  - Peita Letchford
  - Carl Looper
  - Robert Marchand
  - Mitch Mathews
  - Mark Osborn
  - Sue Randall
  - Penny Robenstone
  - Jan Sardi
  - John Skibinski
  - Michael Szymanski
  - Peter Viska
  - Heather Williams
  - Vincent C. Zimbardi
- Animators
  - Richard Chataway
  - Michael Cusack
  - Steve French
  - Ross Gathercole
  - Maggie Geddes
  - Peter Green
  - Anne Jolliffe
  - Penny Robenstone
  - Jonathan Rossiter
  - John Rossiter
  - John Skibinski
  - Peter Viska
  - Andrew Whisson

=== Kaboodle 2 ===
- Executive producer: Patricia Edgar
- Supervising Producer: Susie Campbell
- Writers, Producers and Directors
  - Richard Chataway
  - Michael Cusack
  - Maggie Geddes
  - Neil Robinson
  - Peter Viska
  - Paul Williams
- Series Development: Jeff Peck
- Animators
  - Michael Cusack
  - Ian Forss
  - Steve French
  - Ross Gathercole
  - Maggie Geddes
  - Peter Green
  - Frank Hellard
  - Bill Hodge
  - Greg Ingram
  - Anne Jolliffe
  - Paul Marion
  - Gus McLaren
  - Steve Robinson
  - Joe Rossiter
  - Paul Williams

== Kaboodle Synopsis ==
Each half hour episode tells two or three separate stories using a variety of forms including animation, puppetry, and live action. It was a kaleidoscope of forms, with each episode varying in pace, length and mood. It aimed to provide laughs and tears, fantasy and realism, but specifically tailored to the interests of the young viewer (6-9 year olds). There were thirty-two separate short stories included in the thirteen-part series.

The Short stories

Title	Form	Reference
The Birthday Present	Live action	
The Cure	Animation	
Double Take	Live action	
The Fogbrook Thing	Live action	
Foxbat and the Mini	Animation	
Frieze	Animation	
The Ghost and Katie Domigan	Live action	
The Girl and the Pumpkin	Live action	
The Great Detective	Animation	
The Great Sandwich Swap	Live action	
Gung Ho	Animation	
Hide Until Daytime	Live action	
The Huge Adventures of Trevor a Cat	Animation	
Joshua Cooks	Animation	
The Marvellous Adventures of Miriam and the Miraculous Miranda	Live action and computer animation	
Molly Moves About	Animation	
Penny Pollard's Diary	Live action	
Potato and the Kobold	Live action	
The Secret Life of Trees	Live action	
Snow White and the Dreadful Dwarves	Live action	
The Steam Train Crew	Live action	
There's Dragons	Animation	
Scuff the Sock	Live action and stop-motion animation	
Talo's Story	Computer animation	
Thing	Animation	
There's a Sea in My Bedroom	Computer animation	
The Wheelie Wonder	Animation	
Whiska	Animation	
The Wizards of Solmar	Live action and puppetry	
Wombat and Gumshoe	Animation	

== Kaboodle 2 Synopsis ==
Kaboodle 2 contained four regular drama segments as part of its fully animated 6 half hour mini-series:

- "Echidna Crossing" animated by Maggie Geddes and Neil Robinson
- "The Dream Machine" animated by Paul Williams
- "The Hedge and Mr Snip" animated by Peter Viska
- "The Great Detective" animated by Michael Cusack and Richard Chataway

== Series production ==
The series was produced by the Foundation with Patricia Edgar as Executive Producer and Jeff Peck as Series Producer. It went into production backed by Film Victoria, ABC-TV, the Australian Film Commission and the ACTF. It was the first time these companies came together to fund a children’s television series.

=== Kaboodle ===
==== 1985 ====
In an effort to help give Kaboodle the freshness and vitality needed in an innovative series, the Foundation offered a prize of $1,000 to the student at the Australian Film and Television School and the Film and Television Department at the Swinburne Institute of Technology respectively who submitted the best idea for a Kaboodle story. Winners of the 1985 contest were Alan Love and John Taylor. Love proposed a 10-minute film featuring live action and puppetry titled ‘Scuff and Rebecca”, a fantasy story of a boy and his sock puppets that come to life. Taylor won his prize for his script of ‘The Huge Adventures of Trevor A Cat”, a humorous story about a cat with an ever-increasing appetite, which also received a grant from the Australian Film Commission’s Comedy Fund.

Four other film and television students also had concepts included in Kaboodle. From the Australian Film and Television school, Jennifer Mellet who wrote “The Marvellous Adventures of Miriam and the Miraculous Miranda” (live action and computer animation) and Cate Cahill who wrote “Talo’s Story” (computer animation). From Swinburne, Penny Robenstone wrote “Joshua Cooks” (animation) and Mark Osborn wrote “The Fogbrook Thing” (live action).

==== 1986 ====
Production commenced in June 1986 and was undertaken in Sydney, Melbourne, Adelaide and Perth.

Paul Cox, one of Australia’s leading directors joined the Kaboodle production team. He wrote and directed a twenty minute drama about a little girl’s adventure when she is led by tree gnomes deep into the mysterious caverns below the massive pine and gum trees in her back yard. Entitled ‘The Secret Life of Trees’ Paul originally wrote it as a fairy-tale for his daughter.

=== Kaboodle 2 ===
In June 1988, Kaboodle 2, the follow-on series to the critically acclaimed Kaboodle, was up and running and backed by the Foundation, Film Victoria, the Australian Film Commission, and the South Australian Film Industry Advisory Committee.

Production began July 1988 and was completed June 1989.

== History ==
=== Launch ===
Kaboodle was officially launched by the Minister for the Environment and the Arts, Senator, The Hon. Graham Richardson, at the Menzies at Rialto Hotel in Melbourne on Thursday 15 October 1987. Members of the ABC, Film Victoria, CBS/FOX Video, the media, Kaboodle writers, producers and directors and other members of the film and television industry attended the launch.

=== Accompanying Books ===
==== Kaboodle ====
To accompany the series, four hard cover picture books were published by ABC Enterprises. The picture books were “The Secret Life of Trees”, “The Wheelie Wonder”, “Molly Makes Music” and “Lock Up Your Toys”. The paperbacks included “The Wizards of Solmar”, “Talo’s Story” and “The Kobold and Potato” in one book, with “Double Take”, “Scuff the Sock” and “The Birthday present” in the other.

==== Kaboodle 2 ====
Four books were published by Hodder & Stoughton to accompany the Kaboodle 2 series: "Hedge Island", "The Great Detective and the Case of Captain Blunderbuss’s Secret", "Grandfather’s Dream Machine" and "Echidna Crossing".

Thomas Nelson Australia packaged and marketed an educational package containing the picture story books, videotapes and Kaboodle 2 Teacher’s Notes to schools.

=== Re-screens ===
In July 1988, Kaboodle was re-screened by the ABC.

Kaboodle 1 was re-screened again by the ABC in November 1989 nationally.

Kaboodle re-screened nationally on the ABC, as part of their programming for schools in July on 1990.

Kaboodle 2 was re-screened on the Seven Network across Australia from 6 July 1991.

=== Success and Reach ===
CBS/FOX Video released six Kaboodle video-cassettes in November 1987 and by 30 June 1988, more than 5000 videocassettes had been sold.

On 30 June 1990 CBS/FOX Video reported sales of 6,457 Kaboodle videotapes and The Foundation reported sales of 972 Kaboodle Teacher’s Notes.

Kaboodle 2 was promoted at MIPCOM in October 1989. As a direct result sales were achieved in the following territories: UK, Israel, Singapore and as part of a package distribution arrangement to Spain, Portugal, Albania, Bulgaria, Czechoslovakia, Hungary, Poland, Romania, USSR, Yugoslavia, Africa, Ireland, Greece and Belgium.

By 1991, Both Kaboodle 1 and 2 had been sold into Gibraltar, Iceland, Saudi Arabia and the United Kingdom.

In June 1991, Festival Video reported sales of 2,017 Kaboodle 2 videotapes; Hodder & Stoughton reported sales of 17,584 Kaboodle 2 books; Thomas Nelson reported sales of 110 Kaboodle 2 Teacher’s Notes.

By 1992, both series had been sold into Zimbabwe, Portugal and Greece.

== Awards and nominations ==
Year	Nominated work	Awards Event	Category	Result	Reference
1987	'The Huge Adventures of Trevor a Cat' Kaboodle episode	ATOM Awards, Melbourne, Australia	Children's Award-Best Animation, and Best Film-Tertiary Student	Winner	
1987	'The Fogbrook Thing' Kaboodle episode	ATOM Awards, Melbourne, Australia	Children's Award-Best Narrative	Winner	
1987	'Joshua Cooks' Kaboodle episode	ATOM Awards, Melbourne, Australia	Best Animation	Winner	
1987	'Molly Makes Music' Kaboodle episode	Chicago International Festival of Children's Films, United States	Television production, Part of a Series-Animation	Second prize	
1988	'Double Take' Kaboodle episode	ATOM Awards, Melbourne, Australia	Children's Award-Best Narrative	Winner	
1988	'The Wheelie Wonder' Kaboodle episode	ATOM Awards, Melbourne, Australia	Children's Award-Animation	Winner	
1988	'Molly Makes Music', 'Lock Up Your Toys' and 'The Cure' Kaboodle episodes	ATOM Awards, Melbourne, Australia	Range of categories	Finalists	
1988	Kaboodle series	9th Banff Television Festival, Canada		One of three finalists	
1988	Kaboodle series	1988 Bicentennial Pater Awards	International Children's Variety program-Series Award	Winner	
1988	Kaboodle series	Television Society Australia Awards, Melbourne	Children's program	Award for excellence	

Kaboodle 2
Year	Nominated work	Awards Event	Category	Result	Reference
1990	'The Hedge & Mr Snip' and 'The Great hedge Race' Kaboodle 2 episode	ATOM Awards, Melbourne, Australia	Children's Award-Animation	Highly Commended	
1990	Kaboodle 2	Television Society of Australia Awards, Melbourne	Children's program	Certificate of Merit	
1990	'The Great Detective' regular drama segment of Kaboodle 2	Australian Cinematographers Society (ACS), NSW	Cinema Photography	Winner	

== Reviews ==
Kaboodle screened on ABC Television, Australia wide at 4:30 pm weekdays for 13 afternoons from Monday 26 October. The response to the show from critics and the public was terrific.

- “Kaboodle is full of joy, delight, fantasy and beauty, nothing like the sort of thing nosily hurled at children’s eyes in early morning or late afternoon cartoon sessions…my six year old watches Kaboodle smiling and chattering, a good sign in this viewer.” The Age, Melbourne, 14/11/87
- “Kaboodle is a fascinating concept and refreshingly different” The Daily Telegraph, Sydney, 25/10/87
- “The show offers a veritable melting pot for them to consider” The Daily Mirror, Sydney, 26/10/87
- “Kaboodle, the idea of the ACTF, is a veritable smorgasbord of everything kids (and big kids) like to watch-comedy, adventure, fantasy and realism” The Daily Sun, Brisbane, 26/10/87
- "Those who financed this venture have used our taxes so well that we can only hope there will be more series as good as this" The Age, Melbourne, 14/11/87
- "Just when you thought children's TV had reached rock bottom, along comes Kaboodle", "This innovative 13-part anthology, produced by the ACTF, widens the horizons of TV viewers under 10 with a smorgasbord of home-grown comedy, adventure, fantasy and realism", "It's fun, it's stimulating and refreshingly different" Sunday Observer, Melbourne, 25/10/87
- "Kids and Kaboodle go together! No, we don't mean the general mess and chaos which accompanies busy children, but a new television series", "Kaboodle, produced by the ACTF, goes to air for the first time this week, bringing some welcome light to the children's television scene" The Weekly Times, Melbourne, 21/10/87
- "Kaboodle is an excellent demonstration of the capabilities of Australian animators too, whose work is usually confined to the world of TV advertising" The Sunday telegraph, 25/10/87
- "Kaboodle is a wonderful concept and will hopefully give our children something other than American cartoons, many of which were made some 30 years ago" The Sunday Observer, Melbourne, 18/10/87
- "Kaboodle uses a unique blend of styles and moods to offer an entertaining and unusual series for young children" The Advocate, Tasmania, 26/10/87
- "It's the first special television for young children ever made in this country, and it serves for them what we adults require of our programs-it reflects their lives, it's high quality, and it's very entertaining", "Kaboodle is a magic box of superb offerings collected by the ACTF. It's an anthology of terrific stories from some of our brightest and best and sometimes youngest filmmakers" Parents & Children, Australia, Oct/Nov 1987
