= Kahootz =

Children's educational software

- Flash 8
- Developer(s): Australian Children's Television Foundation
- Stable release: 2.0.5 / March, 2006
- Operating system: Cross-platform
- Type: 3D computer graphics software
- License: Proprietary
- Website: www.actf.com.au/education/kahootz (inactive)

Kahootz was an education multimedia construction toolset created by the Australian Children's Television Foundation. Using this program, one can make 3D animations using the pre-made objects and backgrounds. It was used by many schools to teach not only making movies with the program but co-operation between the students.

As of 2012 the software is no longer available to purchase, and support has stopped.

== Description ==
Kahootz was designed for children. It made use of many colours, characters, movements and pictures. Many Australian schools had access to this program. In fact, the Victorian Government bought the program for every school in Victoria.

== Features ==
Kahootz starts up with a New Scene. A "world" is then chosen and characters and objects can be added in the same way as 3D Movie Maker. It is possible to zoom in and out and change the camera angle, as Kahootz is 3D, so it is as if you are in a real world.

Animating the object is similar to motion tweening in Macromedia Flash. A keyframe is created with the object in the desired position. A second keyframe is then created and the object is moved to the new desired position. One can then preview this with the convenient Preview button.

Many scenes could be put into a collection called an xpression. These small files could then be converted in QuickTime and AVI movies for viewing.

== Plug-ins ==
=== Kahootz Movie Maker ===
Kahootz Movie Maker is a plug-in to the program. It is used to convert into AVI (for Windows) and QuickTime (for the Mac) it also was used to convert files into oxis files, used for video editing uses.

=== Pattern Manager ===
This plug-in allowed the user to edit the patterns pre-loaded into the program. Support was added for this plug-in in the 2.0.4 update.

== Version history ==
The last version of Kahootz was Kahootz 3, released in May 2008.

== See also ==
- 3D Movie Maker
