= Winners (Australian TV series) =

Australian children's television anthology series

Winners is an Australian children's television anthology series conceived and produced for the ACTF by its founding director, Patricia Edgar. It first screened on Network 10 in 1985 as part of the Australian Broadcasting Tribunal's newly implemented C classified drama quota. It featured eight self-contained telemovies and stories. Patricia Edgar was confident that Winners would be a landmark in the development of quality children's television and that it would go on to set the standard nationally and internationally for future children's productions. More Winners is the second season of the series, first screened on ABC in 1990. It featured six self-contained telemovies and stories.

At the forefront of the creators' minds when making the shows was the importance of Australian children having access to a rich and diverse choice of programs that reflected their own society and were appropriate to their particular stage of development. The different episodes dealt with themes of aspirations, friendship, competition, conflict, jealousy, family, lifestyles, independence, decision making, and personal growth. The series had a general theme of young people winning over their circumstances, accepting challenges, gaining confidence, making their own decisions, coming to terms with life, and growing up.

Winners broke new ground for television and for the classroom. Each telemovie was accompanied by a novel, written by the scriptwriter, along with teaching materials to assist classroom teachers. The series was screened in 82 countries around the world and won awards that drew attention to the Australian children's production industry.

== Background ==
In the 1980s, Australian adolescents were a much-neglected television audience. Despite their television viewing increasing at the time, there were few programs that catered to their particular needs and interests, such as relationships, problems, and joys.

Patricia Edgar, director of the ACTF, in association with the Victorian Department of Youth, Sport and Recreation, commissioned a major research project to develop a format, characters, and series concept for a serial aimed specifically at Australian teenagers.

Researchers conducted preliminary work in 1983 on case studies and recent survey data with assistance from the Institute of Family Studies. The foundation wanted to provide a realistic representation of Australian life in the telemovies and to move away from stereotypes. The writers then undertook extensive interviews with police social workers, youth workers, government departments, educators, parents, and naturally, many young people in the projected age range. Don Edgar, foundation director of the Australian Institute of Family Studies, briefed writers on the nature of real Australian families and what actually went on in Australian homes in the mid-1980s.

Winners attracted not only Australia's best writers, producers, and directors at the time, but also one of the nation's leading business identities, Robert Holmes à Court, who provided a worldwide distribution guarantee for the series and agreed to invest in the show.

The show was designed as an anthology that challenged contemporary social issues. It incorporated comedy, science fiction, historical drama, adventure, fantasy, and social realism. It showcased the struggles young children have in growing up and learning to make their own decisions. The series asked parents to consider the pressures on their children as well as those on themselves. Each of the eight films was written about and for children in Australia and raised issues important to children: parents and family life, friendship, independence, authority, peer-group pressure, education, employment, recreation, and the threat of nuclear war.

More Winners was designed as a series of six hour-long tales aimed primarily at the 9-13 age group.

== Episodes ==
=== Winners (1985–1986) ===
No. overall	No. in season	Title	Directed by	Written by	Original release date
1	1	"Room to Move"	John Duigan	John Duigan	
This episode focuses on Carol and Angie, two schoolgirls who lead different lifestyles but who gradually develop a friendship. It deals with themes of parental neglect, student overwork, dedication, and being true to one's aspirations.
2	2	"Just Friends"	Michael Pattinson	Jan Sardi	
This episode focuses on Susan Foster, a new girl in town. She encounters a gang at a skate park and ends up joining them. This leads to her becoming reluctantly involved in mischief. Susan doesn't get the attention or guidance she needs at home. After a string of events, the gang ends up rejecting her, but Susan has learned to make her own judgments and decisions by this point.
3	3	"Quest Beyond Time"	Stephen Wallace	Tony Morphett	
Mike is the protagonist of this tale, which blends reality and fantasy. He loves hang gliding and one day, while up in the air, he finds himself travelling one thousand years into the future. Here he discovers a post-apocalyptic land inhabited by people afflicted with radiation sickness. The episode deals with the dangers of nuclear war and its aftermath.
4	4	"The Paper Boy"	Paul Cox	Bob Ellis	
This is the story of 11-year-old Joe. It is set in 1932, and he is his family's sole means of financial support, working day and night. The episode looks at aspects of Communism.
5	5	"The Other Facts of Life"	Esben Storm	Morris Gleitzman	
Ben understands many things, like how two thirds of the world's population are starving, how the globe can be on the brink of complete nuclear annihilation, and even how governments can torture and murder their citizens. What he doesn't understand is how people are able to carry on living happily when there is all this injustice and potential disaster going on in the world. The episode follows Ben's search for answers, his attempts to create awareness and change through direct action, and his eventual concerns for the welfare of his family.
6	6	"Top Kid"	Carl Schultz	Bob Ellis	
This story is set in 1947 and follows a 10-year-old boy who is bullied by his classmates for his scholastic aptitude and the praise he receives from teachers. The episode deals with themes of success, jealousy, adaptability, disappointment, and dealing with moral dilemmas.
7	7	"On Loan"	Geoffrey Bennett	Anne Brooksbank	
This story follows Lindy, a thirteen-year-old girl of Vietnamese origins living with her Australian adoptive parents. One day, Lindy receives a letter from her biological father, who wants to come meet her. Lindy and her adoptive family are plunged into emotional turmoil. The episode deals with themes of cultural difference, belonging, and identity.
8	8	"Tarflowers"	William Fitzwater	Terry Larsen	
This is a story that combines fantasy and reality. It centres on Kev, a boy with special needs who loves flowers, particularly an imaginary kind called tarflowers. He draws flower murals wherever he can. The episode deals with themes of imagination, care for people with special needs, acceptance of those who are different, and beauty as seen through the eyes of unique children.

=== More Winners (1990) ===
No. overall	No. in season	Title	Directed by	Written by	Original release date
9	1	"Boy Soldiers"	Mark Joffe	Cliff Green	
"Boy Soldiers" is a historical drama based in part on events that occurred in Australia from 1911 to 1915, when all boys between the ages of 14 and 17 had to undergo compulsory military training. The story follows Will Barnes, one of 30,000 boys who failed to obey the introduced law and were prosecuted.
10	2	"His Master's Ghost"	Steve Jodrell	Roger Simpson	
This is a tongue-in-cheek horror telemovie set in the fictional Monstalvat, a Gothic mansion where a music camp brings a group of children together. One of them, Flea, becomes fascinated when he hears of a ghost living in the house.
11	3	"Mr Edmund"	George Whaley	Steve J. Spears	
Mr Edmund is a poor guest staying at Cherry William's mother's boarding house. He dreams that he will sing at the Sydney Opera House one day. Cherry, a 12-year-old girl, befriends Mr Edmund. She also has a dream, that one day she will be a lawyer. Cherry's mother tries to convince them both that their dreams are foolish.
12	4	"Second Childhood"	Mario Andreacchio	Morris Gleitzman	
Annie, Mark, and their friends believe they are actually different people. Annie is convinced she is the reincarnation of the racehorse Phar Lap, and Mark believes he was previously Henry Ford. A school assignment requires them to research the life of a prominent historical figure, and for a while, the children revel in their newfound identities. However, they soon discover that their past selves were collectively responsible for a number of current world problems. In response, the group sets out on a daring mission to rectify what they've previously done.
13	5	"The Big Wish"	Esben Storm	Steve J. Spears	
Faeries in the Enchanted Realm are in trouble. A rule in the Charter of the Grand Master states that Faeries must grant seven wishes to humans every hundred years, or lose their magic powers. It has been nearly one hundred years since the last wishes were granted, but the world has changed much since then, and people no longer believe in Faeries. Except for Christopher.
14	6	"The Journey"	Ken Cameron	Jane Oehr, Ken Cameron	
"The Journey" is a tale of adventure and magic set in 1850. It follows Ada, the daughter of a wealthy prospector, and Agnes, whose mother is a witch. After her father dies, Ada must travel south to find her inheritance. Agnes is ordered by her mother to kill Ada and obtain the treasure instead. However, Agnes is not able to kill Ada and the two girls grow close.

== Production ==
=== Winners ===
Work on the scripts for Winners commenced in 1983 and included the input of writers such as Anne Brooksbank, John Duigan, Bob Ellis, Morris Gleitzman, Cliff Green, Tom Hegarty, Terry Larsen, Tony Morphett, Maurice Murphy, Jan Sardi, and Roger Simpson. Series script editing was done by Roger Le Mesurier and Sandra Levy. The supervising production manager was Geoff Pollock. Scripting was completed in October 1983 and went into pre-production in May 1984.

As an eight-part anthology series of one television-hour dramas, six episodes were produced in Sydney and two in Melbourne. Episodes commenced production at different times between July 1984 and January 1985, with answer prints of all eight episodes being delivered by 31 March 1985. The series was successfully completed within its budgeted cost of $3.82 million and delivered to the distributor on time and in accordance with its distribution agreement. To assist in marketing and to make the series available to as wide a viewing audience as possible, a decision was made during production to have the series captioned for the hard-of-hearing.

=== More Winners ===
The story concepts for More Winners were commissioned in March 1985. The second installment of the show involved such writers as Morris Gleitzman, Roger Simpson, Steve Spears, Mac Gudgeon, Paul Cox, Michael Cove, Ken Cameron, and Jane Oehr. Sandra Levy was the script consultant. Directors attached to the project included Esben Storm, Ken Cameron, Mario Andreacchio, and Michael Pattinson. Production began in early 1990, and the show was launched in June by then-prime minister, Bob Hawke. The foundation produced study kits to accompany the series, and tie-in novels were published as well.

== Reception, accolades, and legacy ==
=== Winners ===
Year	Nominated work	Award Event	Category	Result	Reference
1985	"The Other Facts of Life" and "Quest Beyond Time"	11th International Kinderfilm Festival, Frankfurt	Selection for final screening	Chosen	
1986	"The Other Facts of Life" and "Top Kid"	Banff World Television Festival, Canada	Children's program	Award finalist	
1985	"The Other Facts of Life"	AWGIE Awards, Sydney	Children–Original Work	Winner	
1986	"Top Kid"	Australian Teachers of Media (ATOM) Awards, Melbourne	General Award–Narrative	Winner	
1986	"On Loan"	Australian Teachers of Media (ATOM) Awards, Melbourne	Children's Award–Social Issues	Special commendation	
1986	"On Loan"	Australian Teachers of Media (ATOM) Awards, Melbourne	General Award–Social Issues	Winner	
1986	Quang Chinh Dinh in "On Loan"	St Kilda Film Festival, Melbourne	Acting	Certificate of merit	
1986	"On Loan"	United Nations Association Media Peace Awards, Sydney	-	Citation	
1986	"Top Kid"	Chicago International Festival of Children's Films, United States	Live Action	First prize	
1986	"The Paper Boy"	Chicago International Festival of Children's Films, United States	Live Action	Honourable mention	
1986	"The Other Facts of Life"	Chicago International Festival of Children's Films, United States	Cinematic Impact	Special jury prize	
1986	"Just Friends"	Chicago International Festival of Children's Films, United States	Most Popular Video – voted by the children's audience	First prize	
1986	-	Chicago International Festival of Children's Films, United States	A special award was created by the jury as a result of the response to "Winners" at the festival that recognised the ACTF's outstanding achievements in producing top-quality films for children	-	
1986	"Top Kid"	Penguin Awards, Melbourne	Best Children's Drama	Winner	

=== More Winners ===
Year	Nominated work	Award Event	Category	Result	Reference
1990	Cliff Green, writer of "Boy Soldiers"	AWGIE Awards, Melbourne	Children's Award	Winner	
1990	"Boy Soldiers"	Chicago International Festival of Children's Films, United States	Liv Ullman Peace Prize	Winner	
1990	"The Big Wish"	Chicago International Festival of Children's Films, United States	Festival Award for Outstanding Humour	Winner	
1991	"The Big Wish"	ATOM Awards	Children's Award–Narrative Section	Winner	
1991	"Boy Soldiers"	ATOM Awards	General Award–Narrative Section	Highly commended	
1991	"The Big Wish"	Banff World Television Festival, Canada	Selection for screening in children's program category	Selected	
1991	"The Big Wish"	AFI Awards, melbourne	Best Children's Television Drama	Nominated	
1991	"Mr Edmund"	AFI Awards, melbourne	Best Children's Television Drama	Nominated	
1991	Cameron Nugent in "The Big Wish"	AFI Awards, Melbourne	Top Television Actor Award	Nominated	
1991	Steve J. Spears in "The Big Wish"	AFI Awards, Melbourne	Best Screenplay in a Television Drama	Nominated	
1991	Esben Storm in "The Big Wish"	AFI Awards, Melbourne	Cameraquip Award for Best Achievement in Direction in a Television Drama	Nominated	
1991	"Boy Soldiers"	International Emmy Awards, New York	Children's and Young People's Section	Finalist	
1993	More Winners series	CableAce Awards, Los Angeles, United States	Best International Children's Series	Nominated	
1994	"Boy Soldiers"	Moscow International Festival of Film and Television for Children and Youth, Russia	-	Finalist	

=== Reviews ===
Both Winners and More Winners received praise from a variety of publications, including Perth's West Australian, who called Winners "...everything children's television should be". West Australia's Wanneroo Times called it "...some of the finest television yet seen in this country", and Melbourne's Herald TV Extra wrote, "Winners proves that learning and being entertained can go hand-in-hand." Other outlets that praised the series included Perth's Weekend News and Sunday Times, Mildura's Sunraysia Daily, The Canberra Times, the Sydney Morning Herald, and Launceston's Sunday Examiner. More Winners was greeted with reviews such as "If you think quality Australian children's programming is a thing of the past—don't just think again, think More Winners", from Adelaide's The News and "The joy of this series so far has been its desire to have children put in situations where they stretch themselves creatively, intellectually and imaginatively", published in the Sydney Morning Herald. Other positive reviews came from Melbourne's The Sun, Perth's Daily News, and a variety of others.

== Screenings and sales ==
=== Selected screenings ===
- Melbourne International Film Festival: "The Big Wish", "His Master's Ghost", and "Boy Soldiers" were screened as part of the Children's and Youth Section of the Melbourne International Film Festival in 1990.
- 9th International Film festival for Young Australians: "Second Childhood" was screened at the festival, held in Adelaide in August 1990.
- Film Fest DC: "The Big Wish" was screened in Washington, D.C., in May 1991.
- Harbourfront Festival: "The Big Wish" was shown at this Toronto-based festival in May 1991.
- Beijing TV-International Children's Festival: "Boy Soldiers" and "Mr Edmund" was shown at this event in China in May 1991.
- Banff World Television Festival: "The Big Wish" was selected for screening at this Canadian event in June 1991.
- Cinemagic: "The Big Wish", "His Master's Ghost", "The Journey", "Second Childhood", and "Mr Edmund" were screened as part of a special 'Australian Weekend' at this Irish/Northern Irish children's film festival in December 1991.
- International Kinderfilmfestival: "The Big Wish" was screened as part of a Retrospective of Australian Children's Films 1927–1990 at this German festival in November 1991.

=== Sales ===
==== National ====
In 1985, Winners was sold to Network 10.

In 1996, Disney Channel Australia acquired pay television rights to both Winners and More Winners.

==== International ====
In 1986, Winners was sold to WonderWorks, an award-winning American children's television show. The first episode, "On Loan", aired in March 1996.

Over the years, a variety of nations and territories have acquired rights to the shows, including Japan's NHK, Canada's Knowledge Network, Showtime, Italy's Telepiù, the Netherlands' Kindernet, Panama's FETV, the Zimbabwe Broadcasting Corporation, Iran's Farabi Cinema Foundation and Islamic Republic of Iran Broadcasting, Mexico's Canal Once, Television Nationale du Burkina Faso, and Israeli Educational Television. Other nations who acquired the series include France, Argentina, the UK, Belgium, Ireland, Thailand, Switzerland, Bosnia and Herzegovina, Hungary, the Cook Islands, Bophuthatswana, Singapore, Czechia, and Indonesia.

== Publishing, marketing, and merchandise ==
=== Novels ===
The screenwriters for the series agreed to adapt their screenplays into novels, which were published through McPhee Gribble in Melbourne and distributed through Penguin Books. This was the first time books based on an Australian children's television series were made available in Australia.

=== Study kits / school video packs ===
To enhance the series for educational purposes and to promote discussion on wider issues surrounding each episode, a comprehensive study guide was prepared for teachers and parents. The resources were prepared to enable teachers and students to get the most benefit from the series. The study guides were made available to all primary and secondary schools in the metropolitan areas of Sydney, Melbourne, Adelaide, Perth, and Brisbane at such times that coincided with the network screening of the series, state by state. Copies of the guide were also made available in other areas throughout Australia, as and when regional networks purchased the series.

The school video packs contained a VHS video cassette of one episode, the novel, and a study kit packaged in a specially prepared video box. The marketing campaign directed teachers and school librarians and included seminars, direct mail, advertisements in relevant teacher and student journals, and other promotional activities.

In 1990, CBS/FOX Video released new school packs containing a More Winners video, a tie-in novel, and an accompanying study kit.

== See also ==
- Touch the Sun'
