= Tim Sharp =

Australian artist (born 1988)

Timothy William Sharp (born 9 May 1988) is an Australian artist who has been diagnosed as autistic and is most famous for his creation of the colourful super hero Laser Beak Man. In 2010, Sharp's work garnered international attention when Laser Beak Man was turned into an eight-episode animated television series screening in Australia on ABC3 and it was then sold to Cartoon Network Australia, New Zealand and Asia – a world first for a young man with autism to achieve.

== Early life and education ==
Sharp was born in Brisbane, Queensland, Australia in 1988. Following concerns about his lack of language development – he only used one or two words occasionally and exhibited some unusual behaviours and was constantly upset – he was diagnosed as autistic at the age of three. The specialist's opinion was that the difficulties were so extensive that Tim would never learn anything and that the best thing that could be done would be to put him away and forget about him.

His mother introduced drawing as a means of communicating with her son. After some time of watching his mother draw stick figures to explain a situation Sharp picked up a pencil at age four and began drawing. His mother remembers that his very first drawing displayed his quirky individual style.

Quickly, Sharp began to develop speech and went to using 10 words within a month, increasing to 100 words three months later, from which point his speech continued to develop.

Following a lifelong passion and interest in superheroes, at age 11, Sharp created his own superhero called Laser Beak Man.

At age 16, in 2004, Sharp was the only Australian selected by jury for the world's largest arts festival for people with disabilities, VSA (Very Special Arts) that was founded by Jean Kennedy Smith, sister of President John F. Kennedy. Sharp travelled to Washington, D.C. for the festival and carried the Australian flag into the opening ceremony at the John F Kennedy performing arts centre. The ABC’s Australian Story, made a documentary about Sharp's trip to Washington DC which screened in September 2005.

== Career ==
Sharp is most famous for his bold and colourful artworks completed in crayon that all feature his superhero Laser Beak Man. Many of them are interpretations of pop culture icons or current topics of interest. Others are representations of Sharp's literal understanding of language, a common trait of autism. Most of them reflect Sharp's unique sense of humour and his often-irreverent opinion of people and situations.

Sharp's art is in demand from collectors from around the world. Preferring to exhibit in Australia, his exhibitions are sellout successes, attracting the attention of many prominent Australians and art collectors from around the world.

The National Museum of Australia in Canberra holds an exhibition of Sharp's story and his art in its Eternity gallery. His art has been exhibited in the Sydney Opera House.

In 2010, during an exhibition of his art at the Brisbane Powerhouse, Sharp met visitors to the exhibition Sheldon Liebermann and his animator Igor Coric from BigfishTV in Brisbane who suggested animating the art and produced the series for the Australian Broadcasting Commission.

In 2012, a film about Sharp produced by Arts Queensland was screened at the Metropolitan Museum of Art New York City as part of the Sprout Film Festival. Also, in 2012, The Ghost Ballerinas, a rock band from Nashville, Tennessee, asked Sharp to create the artwork for their album "Play Me on the Radio". Together Sharp and the band members wrote the song "Laser Beak Man" which was included on the album and made available on iTunes. The band members were so inspired by Sharp, they wanted to help others who are autistic and raise autism awareness Autism Acceptance so they put on a music festival in Tennessee called the I Am What I Am music festival. Sharp travelled to Tennessee for the festival.

Sharp's 2014 TEDx Sydney talk received a standing ovation in the Concert Hall of the Sydney Opera House.

The best-selling memoir of Sharp's life, A Double Shot of Happiness, was published in 2015.

A theatre production of Laser Beak Man was developed in conjunction with Dead Puppet Society and the New Victory Theatre at 42nd Street Studios in New York City.
