= List of Round the Twist episodes =

The following is a list of episodes of the Australian children's television series, Round the Twist. It premiered on 6 April 1990 and ended on 2 May 2001, with a total of 52 episodes over the course of 4 series.

== Series overview ==
Series	Episodes	Originally released	
Series	Episodes	First released	Last released
1	13	6 April 1990	6 July 1990
2	13	4 April 1992	26 June 1992
3	13	29 February 2000	16 March 2000
4	13	31 January 2001	2 May 2001

== Episodes ==
=== Series 1 (1990) ===
No. overall	No. in series	Title	Directed by	Written by	Original release date
1	1	"Skeleton On The Dunny"	Esben Storm	Paul Jennings	6 April 1990
The Twist Family move into the seaside town of Port Niranda where they have just bought the lighthouse. Bronson is busting to go to the toilet and is shocked to find that a ghost is haunting the outhouse. The three Twist children set out to find out what the ghost wants. Note: Based on the short story of the same name from Unreal!.
2	2	"Birdsdo"	Esben Storm	Paul Jennings	13 April 1990
When Nell shows up raving about a dragon, the Gribble family plan to keep her in hospital until her house and land with its unpaid mortgage is repossessed and falls into their hands. As Bronson tries to prove the dragon is real, Pete and Linda go to Seagull Shack to find Nell's lost rubies to pay off her mortgage with – but then the seagulls attack with their volleys of droppings. Note: Based on the short stories "Birdscrap" and "There's No Such Thing" from Unbelievable!.
3	3	"A Good Tip For Ghosts"	Esben Storm	Paul Jennings	20 April 1990
Starting at their new school, Pete and Linda are forced by Gribble Jr and his gang to pass a "nerve test" by retrieving a steer's skull from the rubbish tip at night – the same rubbish tip said to be haunted by Old Man Chompers, the ghost of a man searching for his twin long-lost grandchildren. Note: Based on the short story of the same name from Uncanny!.
4	4	"The Cabbage Patch Fib"	Esben Storm	Paul Jennings	27 April 1990
When Bronson asks Tony where babies come from, an embarrassed Tony tells him that babies come from a cabbage patch—which turns out to be true when Bronson discovers a green baby in a cabbage patch. Note: Based on the illustrated story of the same name.
5	5	"Spaghetti Pig-Out"	Steve Jodrell	Paul Jennings	4 May 1990
Pete finds a remote control that can control reality – when Gribble Jr's gang find out, they steal it and use it to compete in a spaghetti eating contest. Note: Based on the short story of the same name from Uncanny!.
6	6	"The Gum Leaf War"	Steve Jodrell	Paul Jennings	11 May 1990
After an accident, Linda ends up with a broken nose. She dreams of her nose being big, so she escapes to the country with her Aunt Tuneless (who looks like Nell), where she discovers that anyone who plays The Wild Colonial Boy on a gumleaf from a certain tree can pass illnesses onto others. She discovers this after Aunt Tuneless uses it against Foxy (who looks like Mr Gribble), a neighbour with whom Aunt Tuneless has been feuding for years. Note: Based on the short story of the same name from Unbelievable!.
7	7	"Santa Claws"	Mark Lewis	Paul Jennings	18 May 1990
Pete discovers the truth behind Jolly Old St. Nick when he meets Santa Claws No. 115,302. He offers two wishes to each Twist. Note: Based on the short story of the same name from Quirky Tails.
8	8	"Wunderpants"	Steve Jodrell	Paul Jennings	25 May 1990
Pete's underpants become blessed with magic powers after he uses a microwave to dry them. Unfortunately, a frog race and a shrinkage problem leave Pete all alone and a bit undressed. Note: Based on the short story of the same name from Unreal!.
9	9	"Lucky Lips"	Steve Jodrell	Paul Jennings	8 June 1990
Pete and Gribble Jr are dying for a kiss from Fiona and the magic lipstick that is irresistible to all females, comes in handy. Unfortunately, it really does mean all females, not always human. Note: Based on the short story of the same name from Unreal!.
10	10	"Know All"	Esben Storm	Paul Jennings	15 June 1990
An old trunk of circus clothes creates all kinds of problems when they begin to come to life. Note: Based on the short story of the same name from Uncanny!.
11	11	"The Copy"	Mark Lewis	Paul Jennings	22 June 1990
A copying machine is a dangerous object, as the Twists soon discover. But none worse than when Linda makes a copy of herself. Note: Based on the short story of the same name from Quirky Tails.
12	12	"Without My Pants"	Esben Storm	Paul Jennings	29 June 1990
Ben Byron, the ghost of a boy who died trying to save his dog, casts a spell on Pete. Now Pete cannot say anything without blurting, "without my pants" at the end of every sentence. Note: Based on the short story "Without A Shirt" from Unreal!.
13	13	"Lighthouse Blues"	Esben Storm	Paul Jennings	6 July 1990
The Gribbles finally succeed in evicting the Twists from the lighthouse. However, unbeknownst to the Gribbles, the developer he has hired plans to destroy the lighthouse. The Twists, Gribbles, and all of their friends join together with the ghosts in the attic to save the lighthouse. Note: Based on the short story of the same name from Unreal!.

=== Series 2 (1992) ===
No. overall	No. in series	Title	Directed by	Written by	Original release date
14	1	"Next Time Around"	Esben Storm	Paul Jennings and Esben Storm	4 April 1992
Linda has hypnotised Pete to act like a chicken for 10 seconds when someone says "now", but does not know how to undo it. Note: Based on the short story of the same name from Unbearable!.
15	2	"Copy Cat"	Steve Jodrell	Paul Jennings and Esben Storm	11 April 1992
Linda's new magic hat, the Mongolian Copy Cat Hat, gives her the power to fly—and everyone in town wants their turn with the hat. Note: Based on the short story "Birdman" from Unmentionable!.
16	3	"Little Squirt"	Esben Storm	Paul Jennings and Esben Storm	18 April 1992
In an effort to prove that he can do anything the older kids can do, Bronson befriends a water spirit who gives him the power to win a urinating competition. Note: Based on the short story of the same name from Unmentionable!.
17	4	"Pink Bow Tie"	Steve Jodrell	Paul Jennings and Esben Storm	25 April 1992
Pete, Gribbs and the gang have a hair problem after fighting off a gang of thieves with a machine making people grow younger or older on board a ferry. Note: Based on the short story of the same name from Unbelievable!.
18	5	"Nails"	Esben Storm	Paul Jennings and Esben Storm	1 May 1992
Linda discovers that a new boy at school has a rather "fishy" problem. Note: Based on the short story of the same name from Unbearable!.
19	6	"Sloppy Jalopy"	Steve Jodrell	Paul Jennings and Esben Storm	8 May 1992
An accident in a toxic sludge puddle turns Pete into a human garbage magnet as anything and everything smelly becomes attracted to him. Note: Based on the short story of the same name from Unmentionable!.
20	7	"Smelly Feat"	Esben Storm	Paul Jennings and Esben Storm	15 May 1992
While Bronson has been wearing his sneakers for six months now, the time has come for Fay's birthday party and Bronson is dying to take off those sneakers in order to save a 200 year old turtle. Note: Based on the short story of the same name from Unbearable!.
21	8	"Grandad's Gifts"	Steve Jodrell	Paul Jennings and Esben Storm	22 May 1992
While the lemon tree begins sprouting instant fruit and Linda gets suspicious, Tony tries to convince Fay to stay after she has one too many fights with Bronson. Note: Based on the short story of the same name from Unbearable!.
22	9	"Ice Maiden"	Esben Storm	Paul Jennings and Esben Storm	29 May 1992
Bronson takes a shine to Tony's ice-sculpted maiden—and the ice maiden wants to make Bronson her groom. Note: Based on the short story of the same name from Unmentionable!.
23	10	"Yuckles"	Steve Jodrell	Paul Jennings and Esben Storm	5 June 1992
While Mr. Gribble sets out to destroy a rainforest and erect a casino, the Twist kids set out to recover a species of magical toadstools called Yuckles which live in the rainforest and can duplicate whatever stands next to them before exploding. Note: Based on the short story "Yuggles" from Unbearable!.
24	11	"Quivering Heap"	Esben Storm	Paul Jennings and Esben Storm	12 June 1992
Jealous that Pete gets to suck Fiona's neck during a school production of Dracula, Gribbs locks Pete in a public toilet. While there, Pete meets a ghost who is forced to scare Pete if he ever wants to get out. Note: Based on the short story "Inside Out" from Unbelievable!. Final episode not to feature Mark Mitchell.
25	12	"Little Black Balls"	Steve Jodrell	Paul Jennings and Esben Storm	19 June 1992
A valuable opal belonging to Nell gets swallowed by a goat. Now Bronson must search through the goat's droppings in order to find it. Note: Based on the short story of the same name and "Licked" from Unbearable!.
26	13	"Seeing The Light"	Esben Storm	Paul Jennings	26 June 1992
As the Twists, the Gribbles, Fay, Fiona, Rabbit, Tiger, and Nell are all trapped in the lighthouse in a storm, the ghost ship of the SS Niranda is returning a hundred years after being wrecked on the coast. The ghost of Matthew, the old lighthouse keeper, possesses Pete in order to save the ghost ship and be reunited with his lost love Jane. Note: Final episode to feature Richard Moir.

=== Series 3 (2000) ===
No. overall	No. in series	Title	Directed by	Written by	Original release date
27	1	"The Big Burp"	Esben Storm	Esben Storm	29 February 2000
While running from bullies and in desperate need to urinate, Pete stops near a strange tree to relieve himself, only to learn that the strange tree is home to a dryad who tells Pete that he is going to be a father, and what is worse: he is the one carrying the baby.
28	2	"Viking Book of Love"	Esben Storm	Esben Storm	1 March 2000
When Vikings Chief Snorri and his son Snorrison travel to Port Niranda through time with an enchanted Book of Love, Linda falls under their spell.
29	3	"Whirling Derfish"	Ray Boseley	Ray Boseley	2 March 2000
Thanks to Gribbs and his cronies dunking him in a water tank, Bronson accidentally eats a rare fish that causes him to spin uncontrollably. Meanwhile, Fay finds The Viking Book of Love in Linda's room.
30	4	"IMU UMI"	Pino Amenta	Chris Anastassiades	3 March 2000
Pete and Harold's minds get switched in a virtual reality gaming accident. Fiona falls for Pete after he reads to her from The Viking Book of Love.
31	5	"Truth Hits Everybody"	Pino Amenta	Chris Anastassiades	6 March 2000
After losing out to Gribbs as the host of the Port Niranda High School Broadcast, Linda decides to do her own show with some old video and sound equipment from a pawnshop, one of which is a microphone that makes anyone who speaks into it tell the truth. Meanwhile, Bronson and James turn vain after reading The Viking Book of Love.
32	6	"The Nirandathal Beast"	Pino Amenta	Chris Anastassiades	7 March 2000
After breaking a family tradition, Bronson is cursed with a metre-long beard and is mistaken for the Nirandathal Beast. Harold and Matron start up a motel business after Harold reads the Viking Book of Love to Matron. Tony and the Twist children struggle with Fay's first Mother's Day.
33	7	"Mali-Boo"	Ray Boseley	Chris Anastassiades	8 March 2000
Pete buys a surfboard to ride during the Port Niranda beach carnival and gets help on how to ride the waves from the ghost of a surfer who died trying to conquer a 200-ft tidal wave that hits the port town every 30 years. Meanwhile, Rabbit and Old Nell get their hands on The Viking Book of Love.
34	8	"Brainless"	Ray Boseley	Ray Boseley	9 March 2000
In an experiment gone wrong, Anthony and Bronson succeed in separating Pete and Linda from their brains. Now, Gribbs' gang have control of the bodies while the brains create havoc in the town. Linda falls for Anthony after he reads from the Viking Book of Love.
35	9	"Toy Love"	Esben Storm	Esben Storm	10 March 2000
When the Twists decide to throw out all their junk, they realise how much of it they really want – except for Linda, who does not want her doll, Veronique. But Veronique is not about to let go of her human friend without a fight. Gribbs, meanwhile is in love with Linda after the Viking Book of Love comes into play. Bronson picks his nose after playing with super glue and his finger gets stuck.
36	10	"Tears Of Innocence"	Esben Storm	Esben Storm	13 March 2000
During a game of cricket, Pete meets a man who has the power to control rain, but fears he may have lost his powers...and things get worse when he falls in with Gribbs and causes a drought in Port Niranda. Meanwhile, Fay falls for Snapper, all thanks to The Viking Book of Love
37	11	"The Ice Cream Man Cometh"	Ray Boseley	Ray Boseley	14 March 2000
After getting fired from the local ice cream parlour, Linda gets a job at a gelato trailer and frees a pale, socially awkward freak she thinks is being held against his will to make gelatos...only to find out that the so-called "freak" is the trailer driver's gelato machine turned human.
38	12	"If The Walls Could Talk"	Pino Armenta	Chris Anastassiades	15 March 2000
Bronson is sick and tired of being ignored by everyone, but now every inanimate object can talk. Bronson decides to rescue Fay from Mr. Snapper by retrieving the Viking Book of Love.
39	13	"The Big Rock"	Esben Storm	Esben Storm	16 March 2000
Snorrison returns to retrieve The Viking Book of Love, only to find that Gribbs turned Fay into a frog by reading the last poem and all the adults are hurtled backwards in time while the kids are left to fend for themselves. Note: Final episode to feature Esben Storm on-screen.

=== Series 4 (2001) ===
No. overall	No. in series	Title	Directed by	Written by	Original release date
40	1	"Welcome Back"	David Swann	Ray Bosley, Louise Fox, Robert Greenberg and Christine Madafferi	31 January 2001
Mr. Snapper is chosen to direct a play for Port Niranda's 200th birthday, but must contend with the ghost of a musical family who died before they could get their fifteen minutes of fame. Meanwhile, Fay tries to hide her pregnancy.
41	2	"Monster Under The Bed"	Ray Boseley	Ray Bosley, Louise Fox, Robert Greenberg and Christine Madafferi	7 February 2001
A thunderstorm and an earthquake bring about a hulking monster made of lint and dirt that has taken residence under Bronson's bed. Meanwhile, Fay worries about breaking the news about her pregnancy to the rest of the family.
42	3	"Linda Godiva"	David Swann	Ray Bosley, Louise Fox, Robert Greenberg and Christine Madafferi	14 February 2001
Linda gains the power to become invisible thanks to a cursed perfume bottle. After ruining Gribbs' reputation she agrees to help Pete win a horserace but ends up revealing a lot more than the fact she is holding the reins.
43	4	"Dog By Night"	Ray Boseley	Ray Bosley, Louise Fox, Robert Greenberg and Christine Madafferi	21 February 2001
At a flea circus, a rare Transylvanian flea named Count Dracumite sinks its teeth into Pete, turning him into a werewolf at night. Not only is he in love with Fiona's dog, but Pete may have to stay that way.
44	5	"TV Or Not TV"	Arnie Custo	Ray Bosley, Louise Fox, Robert Greenberg and Christine Madafferi	28 February 2001
While their parents are away, Pete, Bronson, and Linda get in a fight over what to watch on TV, and the power of them using their remotes simultaneously causes the trio to act like their favorite TV stars (a private detective named Jack Geddes, an Australian football player named Rick the Rock, and a female investigative news reporter named Mary Moore)...until the real Jack, Rick, and Mary enter the real world and trap the Twist kids into the TV world.
45	6	"Face The Fear"	Arnie Custo	Ray Bosley, Louise Fox, Robert Greenberg and Christine Madafferi	7 March 2001
While Linda and Pete attempt to face their fears, Bronson spends a night in the cemetery with an escaped prisoner who tries to steal some loot from Old Man Crenshaw's grave.
46	7	"Hair Brain"	Ray Boseley	Ray Bosley, Louise Fox, Robert Greenberg and Christine Madafferi	14 March 2001
An apprentice hairdresser turns Linda's hair into a curly mess, but the ruined 'do proves to be useful when Linda gains the ability to read minds and speak to people telepathically and Pete wants her to use her new powers to win the school election.
47	8	"The Princess And The Pete"	Ray Boseley	Ray Bosley, Louise Fox, Robert Greenberg and Christine Madafferi	28 March 2001
Pete falls for a new girl named Jade, who protests against the Gribbles' exploiting the mineral water supply because she's a frog that can turn human.
48	9	"Bird Boy"	David Swann	Ray Bosley, Louise Fox, Robert Greenberg and Christine Madafferi	4 April 2001
A huge boy-faced bird has followed Bronson home and is wanted by the public for his extraordinary singing voice.
49	10	"The Shadow Player"	Arnie Custo	Ray Bosley, Louise Fox, Robert Greenberg and Christine Madafferi	11 April 2001
In a total eclipse, Linda's shadow breaks free and tells her how boring she is. But the Shadow Master is out to give the new fun-loving Linda a lesson. So, at a talent show, Pete, Bronson and Linda must escape the Shadow Player so Linda can play her violin.
50	11	"Radio Da Da"	David Swann	Ray Bosley, Louise Fox, Robert Greenberg and Christine Madafferi	18 April 2001
Using Nell's old radio, Pete and Linda are transported back to World War II. As they soon realise, everything they do in 1945 reflects what happens in 2001. Now, Linda and Pete must make life go back to normal or the Gribbles will have complete control of Port Niranda.
51	12	"Skunkman"	David Swann	Ray Bosley, Louise Fox, Robert Greenberg and Christine Madafferi	25 April 2001
Bronson becomes a skunk-themed superhero who uses the power of his body odor to fight evil.
52	13	"The Isle Of Dreams"	Arnie Custo	Ray Bosley, Louise Fox, Robert Greenberg and Christine Madafferi	2 May 2001
The strange, armored man who keeps following the Twist kids throughout the season turns out to be a girl named Ariel, who has chosen the Twist kids to come with her to a magical island city considered the surviving remnants of the lost city of Atlantis. Meanwhile, Fay handcuffs herself to Mr. Gribble and ends up going into labor.
