= Rian McLean =

Australian actor

- Born: Australia
- Occupation: Actor
- Years active: 1991–2004
- Notable work: Round the Twist (2000–2001); Home and Away (2003)

Rian McLean is an Australian actor. He is best known for his role on the television series Round the Twist as well as Home and Away as Christopher Fletcher. Mclean made his first appearance on TV in 1991, at the age of 7. His last appearance was on season 8 of the show Stingers in 2004.

== Career ==
McLean made his television debut in 1991, appearing in an episode of The Flying Doctors, during the series' eighth season. He later returned to the series in the ninth and final season, playing a different role. In 1994, he made a guest appearance on the police drama series Blue Heelers, and again in 1995 when he appeared in a new role. He also appeared in an episode of the second series of the ABC children's television series Lift Off. In 2000, he made a guest appearance on children's series Pig's Breakfast. McLean later portrayed the role of Pete Twist in the ABC children's television series Round the Twist, a role for which he is best known. He was cast in the series for seasons three and the final fourth season. The role was previously played by Sam Vandenberg and Ben Thomas in season two, before the series went on hiatus in 1992 when it finished on the Seven Network, and returning in 2000. What followed was a recurring role on the Seven Network soap opera Home and Away, when McLean appeared as Christopher Fletcher, a character originally introduced in 1988; being played by different actors until 1998. McLean played the role of Christopher when the character returned in 2003, to stay with Irene Roberts (Lynne McGranger) for a short holiday. Initially getting along with Irene's foster son Nick Smith (Chris Egan) and his best friend Seb Miller (Mitch Firth), Nick begins to suspect that Christopher is hiding a secret. It is later revealed that Christopher is gay when he tries to kiss Seb. McLean has also appeared on soap opera Neighbours and Nine Network drama series Stingers.

== Filmography ==
Year	Title	Role	Notes
1991	The Flying Doctors	Joey; Gavin	Season 8, episode 7 "The Sleep of Reason"; Season 9, episode 11 "Two Splatt Shuffle"
1994–1995	Blue Heelers	Damien Poulton; Malcolm Grant	Season 1, episode 20 "The Final Season"; Season 2, episode 40 "Brotherly Love: Part 1"
1995	Lift Off		recurring role; season 2
2000	Pig's Breakfast		Season 2, episode 21 "With Friends Like These"
2000–2001	Round the Twist	Pete Twist	Main role Seasons 3 & 4; 26 episodes
2003	Home and Away	Christopher Fletcher	recurring role; season 16
2003	Neighbours	Matt Porter	Season 19 - 1 episode
2004	Stingers	Steven Marr	Season 8, episode 11 "Starlight Hotel"
