= Garth Boomer =

Garth Boomer (1940 – 1993) was an influential educationalist working in Australia. Since 1995 the Australian Association for the Teaching of English has held a Garth Boomer Memorial Address in his honour. He was particularly influential in the teaching of English, and he was president of the Australian Association for the Teaching of English for a time.

== Early life ==
He was born on 12 September 1940 at Mount Barker, South Australia. He was a son of South Australian-born parents Charlemagne Carlyle Guilford Boomer, who was a brickmaker, and Rita Ivy, née Miels. He received his primary education at Littlehampton Primary School and Adelaide Boys High Schools. He graduated with honors from the University of Adelaide in 1962, where he received his Bachelor of Arts.

== Career ==
After graduation he was a teacher of English, Latin and mathematics in South Australian State secondary schools. Later he became the first consultant in English in South Australia. He completed his Master of Arts at the London Institute of Education in 1972–73.

In 1980 he became a director of the Wattle Park Teachers Centre, which was the curriculum and teacher development centre for the South Australian education system. In 1984 he moved to Canberra, where he took a position of director of the Curriculum Development Centre. In 1985 he became chairman of the Commonwealth Schools Commission. In 1988, he became chairman of the Schools Council, one of four councils of the National Board of Employment, Education and Training. In July 1988 returned to South Australia to serve as an Associate Director-General of Education. From 1981 until 1984 he was a president of the Australian Association for the Teaching of English. From 1983 until 1985 he also was a chair of the International Federation for the Teaching of English. From 1989 until 1993 he was the South Australian representative and vice-chairman of the Australian Children's Television Foundation. He contributed to the creation of Lift Off, which was an innovative approach to children's television.

He was awarded Life Membership at Australian Association for Teaching English in 1977.

== Death ==
He died of brain cancer on 16 July 1993 in the Daw House Hospice, Adelaide and was cremated.

Posthumously an education building at the University of South Australia was named after him.

== Private life ==
On 2 January 1965 he married Jean Graham McNaught, who was a teacher at the Albert Street Methodist Church, Brisbane. They had a daughter, Catherine and a son, Simon.

== Awards ==
He was awarded a Medal of the Order of Australia and Member of the Order of Australia in 1993.

== Publications ==
Boomer's works include:

- Designs on learning: essays on curriculum and teaching, with Bill Green (ISBN 1-875864-31-8)
- Changing education: reflections on national issues in education in Australia (ISBN 0-642-10066-7)
- Creativity in education: making things (ISBN 0-9593339-2-4)
- Fair Dinkum Teaching and Learning: Reflections on Literacy and Power (ISBN 0-86709-139-8)
- Metaphors and meanings: essays on English teaching, with Bill Green (ISBN 0-909955-82-4)
- Negotiating the curriculum: a teacher-student partnership (ISBN 0-86896-166-3)
- Negotiating the curriculum: educating for the 21st century, with Garth Lester, Nancy Onore, Cynthia Cook, Jonathan (ISBN 1-85000-931-7)
- Orange moon, with Peter W McFarlane (ISBN 0-7270-0032-2)
- The endless circle, with Morris Hood (ISBN 0-582-68061-1)
- The runaway sun, with Morris Hood (ISBN 0-582-68057-3)
- The Spitting Image, Reflections on language, education and social class, with Dr Dale Spender (ISBN 0-7270-0162-0)
- Themes and images: a series of photographic stimuli for talking and writing (ISBN 0-909773-20-3)

Garth also contributed to a number of academic articles. Several of these are available via Google Scholar.
