= Lift Off (Australian TV series) =

Children's television series

- Written by: Nancy Black; Garth Boomer; Bob Ellis; John Hepworth; Rick Maier; Jeff Peck; Tony Watts
- Directed by: Steve Jodrell; Paul Nichola
- Starring: Erin Pratten; Paul Cheyne; Nikita Plummer (Series 2); Luke Carroll; Aku Bielicki; Heber Yerien (Series 1); Robert Peschel; Mario Filintatzis (Series 2); Jared Daperis (Series 2); Maria Nguyen; Rian McLean (Series 2); Cameron J Smith; Mark Mitchell
- Theme music composer: Chris Neal
- Country of origin: Australia
- Original language: English
- No. of series: 2
- No. of episodes: 78

Production
- Executive producer: Patricia Edgar
- Producers: Patricia Edgar; Margot McDonald; Ewan Burnett; Rob Pemberton; Susie Campbell; Peter Clarke; Peter Jackson
- Running time: 25 minutes

Original release
- Network: ABC TV
- Release: 8 May 1992 – 24 March 1995

Lift Off is an Australian children's television series developed and produced by Patricia Edgar. It was broadcast on ABC Television from 1992 until the series concluded in 1995.

Each episode featured a live-action storyline about a group of young children and the problems they encountered while growing up, including interactions with their parents and various social issues.

Episodes also included segments of short animation, puppetry, and documentary footage, as well as songs, stories, and word games. Aimed at 3- to 11-year-olds, the series was linked to school curricula through the Curriculum Corporation of Australia. Different episodes used stories and locations to explore subjects such as jealousy, loneliness, and anger. The puppet characters were designed by illustrator Terry Denton and constructed by sculptor Ron Mueck.

== Plot ==
The program focuses on child actors aged between four and ten. Coming from different cultural, social, and familial backgrounds, the small group of seven children approach their environment with a sense of adventure, fantasy, and inquiry. Their play and interactions form the theme around which each episode revolves. These children feature in the drama elements of the program but serve as the departure point for all other elements.

The show's cast also includes adults, puppets, and live and animated performers. The main characters' parents appear in every episode, and their interactions reflect a variety of family situations.

A major fantasy character in Lift Off is "EC", a sentient rag-doll puppet with an amorphous head barely suggestive of facial features, which serves as a confidante and friend to the children.

Another main character is a lift named Lotis. Located in the apartment building where two of the families live, Lotis appears to adults as a normal, everyday lift. It takes people to their desired floors, greets them vocally, and occasionally frustrates them with its unreliability. To the children, however, Lotis is a friend, mentor, and fellow explorer of their world. Lotis is an artificial intelligence with a computer matrix screen on her back wall that displays clues, questions, diagrams, and games. She can take the children anywhere in space or time, sometimes opening her doors onto the surface of the Moon, a beach, or the bottom of the ocean.

Other puppets include Rocky, a frill-necked lizard who is an anthropologist and documentary cameraman seen fleetingly on location gathering material about the program's human characters. His humorous documentary films are shown to an audience of frill-necked lizards towards the end of each episode and reflect on the folly of the "two-footers".

The "backsacks" are another species of regular puppet characters. Travelling on the children's backs, these limbless eccentrics have a very different outlook on life, primarily because they spend their time being thrown on the ground, hung on pegs, or stuffed full of items, which affects their attitude towards their owners. They are the unrecognised workers of the puppet world.

Beverley and her Patches sit in the foyer of the building where most of the children live. Beverley is a potted plant with a very long stalk and a single eye on the end that surveys the world. This is her link to the natural environment. Viewers see the world through her eyes.

The Patches have lives of their own. They can break away from the pot and become animated shapes that form and reform to create other shapes, or move to certain rhythms before jumping back onto the pot.

Documentary segments present specific skills, potentially involving acrobats, gymnasts, or dressage events, modelling a range of skills to intrigue and challenge children.

=== Segments ===
The two main animation segments are "The Munch Kids" and the animated "Feature Story". "The Munch Kids" is a three-minute segment featuring edited discussions with children tackling topics related to the episode's theme. The resulting voice track is presented to animators who visually interpret aspects of the discussion.

Lift Off features a major puppet segment titled "The Wakadoo Café". Directed by Paul Nichola and written by Bob Ellis, Tony Watts, and Nancy Black, the café is a dynamic, busy social hub filled with fascinating characters and unusual guests. The drama is occasionally broken by performances from various guest artists, musicians, and performers.

Lift Off features a wide range of documentary material, including original footage of Aboriginal children shot in Arnhem Land by Stephen Johnson, showing children engaged in skilled activities and play. It also explores different environments, worlds, peoples, animals, and plants. The world is presented as an accessible and exciting environment requiring understanding and care.

== History ==
During its development, the aim for Lift Off was to address the challenges of shaping a children's program for the 21st century, considering contemporary knowledge of children's minds and the future interests of Australian culture. Lift Off broke with the conventions of its time in many ways. The program's inclusion in the school curriculum, through the Curriculum Corporation, was a world first. Lift Off acknowledged no accepted wisdoms about the extent or limits of children's abilities, operating on the belief that those limits had not yet been gauged.

Development of the series commenced in December 1988 with the intention of creating a program that would foster competent and autonomous children. Although not specifically curriculum-driven, Lift Off aimed to stimulate all aspects of a child's development. Loosely based on the "multiple intelligences" theory of Harvard University's Dr. Howard Gardner, the program combines elements of animation, drama, performance, puppetry, and documentary. Each episode is thematically driven rather than adopting a magazine format. Links are established between elements to provide an episode structure.

Early in 1989, an initial research phase commenced. Early childhood specialists, academics, and practitioners from fields including early childhood development, language and literacy, literature, music, play, artistry, movement, child care, personal development, and psychology were consulted. In July 1989, the Foundation conducted an intensive three-day series of seminars at Erskine House in Lorne, Victoria. The 62 participants came from every Australian state and territory, as well as the US, New Zealand, and Hong Kong. Their diverse skills and experience encompassed children's social and emotional development; early language, literacy, and literature; logical-mathematical and philosophical thought; environment, health, and technology education; children's play, folklore, and culture; and creativity and artistry. Participants discussed the development of children aged 3–8, the potential value of Howard Gardner's multiple intelligences framework (the project's proposed basis), and proposed content strands. From this seminar emerged a detailed statement of the program's philosophy, aims, and objectives.

In November 1989, 45 creative personnel specializing in writing, direction, animation, puppetry, performance, illustration, music, and movement—including ACTF staff—met for another series of seminars. The major focus of this four-day conference was formulating a program concept for the Lift Off series, including character development, episode structure, and the curriculum.

Howard Gardner visited Australia in July 1991 to examine the Lift Off program and its development to date. During the visit, he wrote a short paper explaining the link between his theories and Lift Off:

"It seeks to bridge the gap between our understanding of children's mental processes and our understanding of what moves, excites, and engages them; and it seeks to blend our insights about television which entertains and television which educates.

"From all that I have learned about Lift Off, it has been conceived and launched in the most impressive and mindful way. Engaging characters, appealing milieus, powerful story lines have been mobilised in the service of a world view in which it is natural to use one's mind. The playful and yet mindful stance, the respect for thinking in any medium, the irreverence for pomp or prejudice, the links between activities that children enjoy carrying out and the filling of important and needed social roles, the willingness to discuss serious issues and not to jump to premature or canned answers—it is these features which set the program apart far more so than any particular educational philosophy, or any particular educational philosopher.

Problems of change

"Individuals, be they parents, teachers, or even young children, are very difficult to change. Inertia operates with full force and even the most exciting educational innovations have rarely if ever yielded demonstrable long term effects. Indeed, in the US, despite massive reform efforts over the century, most classrooms are not much different than they were a century ago!

External involvement

"Efforts are being initiated to help parents and teachers and children draw on Lift Off in ways in which they have rarely approached television: rather than sitting back and viewing the shows, viewers will have the opportunity to examine (and re-examine) individual segments so that they can become the centrepiece of educational discussion, just as magazines and kits for home use will help ensure that the programs become a stimulus to, rather than a toxin against, mindfulness.

"There is now talk in Australia about producing a society with clever children. If I were asked how one might fashion a society where the mind of the child is treated with the seriousness which it merits, and where the most powerful medium of our time were yoked with the other principal forces in the country, I could think of no better example than the efforts of the past three years to develop the Lift Off series....Lift Off is an experiment. I would add now that it is an important experiment, not just for Australia but for the entire world. It deserves—ardently—to succeed as a genuine educational innovation, and I am cautiously optimistic that it will."

The 26 Feature Stories were written by some of Australia's top children's writers, illustrators, and animators, including Paul Jennings, Terry Denton, Peter Viska, and Pamela Allen. These three-minute stories were produced by a mix of animators who had worked on Foundation programs before, alongside talented newcomers.

=== Criticism ===
Alan Kendall (Executive Producer of Play School) strongly criticized Lift Off's principles as an educational show for 3- to 10-year-olds. In 1991, when the ACTF was pitching Lift Off to the ABC board, Kendall argued that "Lift Off misses the point of television," claiming it was dogmatic in its approach and would "threaten the security of three- to four-year-olds and create jagged attention patterns like Sesame Street".

=== Response to criticism ===
Those who had attended Lift Off workshops (see Production section) explained to the Australian government and the ABC board how the show would carve a new path and curriculum for juvenile education. Lift Off was subsequently approved and purchased by the ABC. A few years later, the ABC described Lift Off as "the most outstanding children's programme broadcast by the ABC in 35 years of television".

== Production ==
In 1988, Patricia Edgar, director of the ACTF, decided to develop a program for 3- to 10-year-olds aimed at fostering children who:

- are competent and autonomous in all areas;
- can manage the world into which they have been brought;
- can contribute to the world's harmony;
- have the capacity to improve the community in which they live.

=== Lift Off (Series 1) ===
Lift Off, a series of 52 half-hour episodes for 3- to 10-year-olds, went into production in September 1991. It was originally designed as a 26-part series and was the Foundation's most ambitious television undertaking yet, created to play a vital role in the upbringing of every Australian child.

=== Lift Off 2 ===
Production commenced in February 1994 and finished in October 1994. Lift Off 2 is a 26-episode half-hour series that again combines drama, animation, puppetry, and documentary elements thematically. The drama revolves around the same regular cast as the first series, joined by several newcomers: Nikita Plummer as Annie (Poss and Nipper's younger sister); Mario Filintatzis as Marco; and Jared Daperis as Marco's younger brother, Ralph, from a new family that moves into the apartment building.

=== Workshops ===
In 1990, two workshops were held to consult 60 early childhood experts and creative filmmakers concerning the program's content and philosophy.

Australian specialists in child development were selected to attend the workshops and determine the principles and aims of Lift Off. The second workshop focused on character development and fantastical themes and plots for production. The primary aim was to create a new syllabus to ground the show, its concepts, and its characters.

Activities during these workshops were deliberately practical and creative. For example, attendees were grouped with individuals from vastly different fields (e.g., specialists in children's mathematics alongside juvenile development researchers) and instructed to create art or discuss specific tasks and challenges before presenting their conclusions to the wider group.

=== Outreach ===
A complementary outreach program was developed to engage the community with young children and the television series. This outreach aimed to extend Lift Off's impact beyond the TV screen, including the production of books, toys, puzzles, and other activities that reinforced ideas and skills introduced in the program.

==== First Outreach ====
Approximately forty people attended the first outreach workshop, held at Warburton, Victoria, from 17 to 31 July 1990. Over the weekend, discussion groups brainstormed and analyzed strategies for implementing a national outreach scheme to accompany and amplify the program's reach and efficacy. The conference concentrated on resources and materials, management structures, and existing or new institutional and community works.

Outreach programs were subsequently set up in each Australian state.

==== Educational packages ====
===== Lift Off =====
In 1990, two workshops were held to consult early childhood experts and creative filmmakers concerning the program's content and philosophy. Educational materials were written by teachers seconded from various Ministries of Education. Teacher's Guide to Lift Off was the first in a series of educational materials published at monthly intervals following the series' launch.

Subsequent published programs included:

- Lift Off to Thinking and Wondering
- Lift Off to Language
- Lift Off to Science and Technology
- Lift Off to Social Learning and Living
- Lift Off to Environmental Education
- Lift Off to Play
- Lift Off to Social Growth and Learning
- Lift Off to Language (2)

Each book was accompanied by a video anthology highlighting aspects of the series linked to the teacher's notes.

===== Lift Off 2 =====
New materials were designed to complement the existing "Lift Off in the Classroom" resources published by the Curriculum Corporation during the first series.

- Lift Off To Fire Safety

The Foundation worked with the Metropolitan Fire Brigade in Melbourne to develop an educational package around a Lift Off 2 episode titled "Heroes", which focused on home fire safety. The materials were suitable for children in their early years of primary schooling nationally.

- Lift Off to Aboriginal Education

In consultation with representatives from Aboriginal arts and education organizations, two episodes of Lift Off were developed for distribution to schools.

=== Launch ===
==== Lift Off ====
Prime Minister Paul Keating launched Lift Off during a special screening and presentation at Parliament House in Canberra on 29 April 1992. In his speech, he stated:

"If the children who watch Lift Off, and read the Lift Off spin-offs, develop the same skills of communication, cooperation and execution as producers have displayed, we will really be able to say that this country is pretty clever. Lift Off also suggests what television is capable of—which is to say much more than we and our children are generally given."

US First Lady Barbara Bush gave the series a significant stamp of approval when she visited the Foundation in January 1991 for a preview. She described it as "Just wonderful. This is an extraordinarily good program".

Lift Off was endorsed by Directors of Curriculum from all states and territories, who agreed that "the program is very soundly based educationally" and that "the proposed contents, scope and coverage of intelligences are consistent with the range of curriculum activities in the early years".

The first series of 52 half-hour episodes began airing on the ABC on 8 May 1992. Screened at 2:00 pm on Fridays, it was also repeated after school at 4:30 pm on weekdays from 29 June 1992, and on Saturday evenings from September 1992.

==== Lift Off series 2 ====
The second series was launched by The Hon. Peter Collins, QC, MP (NSW Minister for the Arts), at Taronga Zoo in Sydney on 5 February 1995.

At the launch, Mr. Fish, James Jordan, the Wakadoo pigs and wolf, and the Lift Off kids performed for a large crowd comprising ACTF and ABC board members and staff, cast and crew, media representatives, and their families.

== Publishing and merchandise ==
The series was supported by a wide range of materials developed and marketed for children, childcare professionals, educators, parents, and other caregivers.

Octopus Publishing program

An agreement was made with the Octopus Publishing Group of Australia, whose educational publishing division was Rigby-Heinemann. William Heinemann handled children's books for the trade market.

The titles published as of 1992 included three hardcover picture storybooks:

- "Burping Baby" by Penny Robenstone Harris
- "Ice Flowers" by Jutta Goetze and Patricia Mullins
- "Dancing Pants" by Pamela Rushby and Maya

And two softcover storybooks:

- "The Wakadoo Café" by Jim Howes and Terry Denton
- "The Backsack Bulletin" by Rod Quantock and Ann James

Later publications in 1992–93 included the Lift Off kids' books:

- "Rocky on Assignment"
- "Adventures with EC"
- "Lift Off with Lotis"
- "Lift Off Fun Book"
- "Grandma's Knee"

Budget Book Publishing

Recognizing that for many families the major (and often only) contact with books was through supermarkets, a publishing program was agreed with Budget Books—also part of the Octopus Group—to sell directly to stores like Kmart, Coles, Woolworths, and Big W. The first five books sold in these stores were:

- "Activity Pack"
- "Colouring Book"
- "Sticker Fun Book"
- "Paint 'n' Colour"
- "Fun With Felt"

The Lift Off Book

The Lift Off Book was published in 1993. Targeting parents, it highlighted how they might use Lift Off as a springboard for activities to enhance the quality of their children's lives. The book explained how the program was shaped to cater to children's multiple intelligences. The material illustrated models for learning at this age and showed how they could be based on children's play. In addition to information for parents, ideas for activities, games, and organizing playtime were provided by author Ralph Hampson.

Magazine

To coincide with the program's screening, a children's bimonthly magazine was edited by Jim Howes and published by Text Media. The 44-page full-color magazine featured Lift Off characters and encouraged children to undertake a wide range of activities.

Sales were by subscription, as well as through newsagents and other major outlets, including a national book club distributing to schools. The Outreach network assisted with the promotion and distribution of the magazine.

Lift Off Merchandising

Available in retail outlets from September 1992 included:

- "Four frame tray jigsaw puzzles and four boxed jigsaw puzzles" by Murfett Regency
- "Three backsaks, an EC doll and finger puppets of the Wakadoo characters and Rocky" by Playcorp
- "Twelve greeting cards, two gift wraps and two gift cards" by John Sands Greetings
- "Lift Off clothes (T-shirts, shorts and skirts) exclusive to Myer Grace Bros and ABC Shops" by Motto Trading
- "Lift Off videos" by ABC Enterprises/Roadshow
- "'Songs from Lift Off' and 'more Songs from Lift Off'" by ABC Music/Polygram on CD and audiocassette

== Music ==
Music was a core component of Lift Off series 1 and 2. Many composers and lyricists were involved in writing songs for the series, and several composers were retained to write underscores for the programs. Chris Neal, who had been involved with various ACTF productions prior to Lift Off, was heavily involved as the official Music Consultant. He wrote many of the songs for the Wakadoo Café puppets, as well as the Lift Off theme song. David Cheshire served as music director for both series alongside Chris.

=== Composers and lyricists ===
==== Series 1 ====
- Frank Strangio (Live Action Underscore)
- Paul Grabowsky (Wakadoo Café Underscore, one song, and arranged another Wakadoo song)
- Danny Beckerman (Patches)
- Peter Mumme (Beverley Sequences)
- David Cheshire (Music Director, Live Action Underscore)
- Michael Atkinson (Rocky and Live Action Underscore)
- David Pyle (Animation)
- Rick Caskey (Animation)
- Greg Sneddon (Lotis, Live Action Underscore, and two Live Action Songs)
- Chris Neal (Music Consultant, Wakadoo Café Songs, Theme Song, and a Live Action Song)
- Bob Ellis (Lyricist with Chris Neal on Wakadoo Café Songs)
- David Crosbie (Animation)
- John Taylor (Animation)
- Chris Copping (Animation)
- Glenn Tabuteau (Animation)
- Ian Davidson (Live Action Underscore and a Backsack Song)
- Paul Livingston (Animation)
- Brian Lang (Various)
- Tommy Lewis (Didgeridoo)
- Kevin Hocking (Animation)
- Gareth Vanderhope (Animation)
- Peter Sullivan (Live Action Underscore)
- Niko Schauble (Co-composer with Paul Grabowsky)
- Felicity Foxx (Various)
- Charlie McMahon (Animation)
- Rory O'Donoghue (Animation)
- Yuri Worontschak (Co-composer with Paul Grabowsky)
- Garth Boomer (Lyricist with various songwriters)
- Tony Watts (Lyricist on 'Doris Sings the Blues' with Paul Grabowsky and 'Into the Unknown' with Michael Atkinson)
- Will Conyers (Four Wakadoo Café songs)
- John Rogers (Lyrics for 'The Hot Seven Song' with Will Conyers)
- Mark Mitchell (Lyrics for 'No Entry' song)
- Peter Dasent ('Which One?' song)
- Janet Preston ('Going Under' song)
- Denny Lawrence ('Going Under' song)
- Steve Matters ('Something Tells Me' song)
- Lynette 'Tubby' Justice ('Something Tells Me' song)
- Alan Harding ('Scratch Song')
- David Sandford ('Threads' music, various saxophone solos on other songs)
- Betty Greenhatch ('Threads' lyrics)
- Paul Begaud (Composed 'It's Not Fair' and 'Destroy')
- Les Gock (Composed 'The Wheel Turns')
- Mike Brady (Producer of various songs, composed 'Do You Remember?')

==== E. C. Plays Lift Off ====
- Chris Neal (Titles music)
- Helena Harris (Titles lyrics, adapted from Chris Neal's original work)
- Paul McDermott (Underscore)

==== Lift Off 2 ====
- Frank Strangio (Live Action Underscore)
- Paul Grabowsky (Wakadoo Café Underscore)
- Danny Beckerman (Patches)
- David Cheshire (Music Director, Various Songs, and Live Action Underscore)
- Michael Atkinson (Rocky and Live Action Underscore)
- Michael Easton (Co-Composer with Michael Atkinson)
- David Pyle (Animation)
- Rick Caskey (Animation)
- Chris Copping (Animation)
- Chris Neal (Music Consultant, Various Songs, and Live Action Underscore)
- Braedy Neal (Thrash, the Dog - Animated Segments)
- David Arden (Wrote 'Give and Take' song)
- Mandy Rollins (Various)
- Elizabeth Wertheim (Various)
- Alan Harding (Composer 'What's Missing?' and 'Wakadoo Rap')
- Rory O'Donoghue (Animation)
- Cass Wigley (Animation)
- Paul Rigby (Animation)
- Cezary Skubiszewski (Animation)
- Jan S. Goldfeder (Animation)
- David Crosbie (Animation)
- Garry Taylor (Animation)
- Terry Spencer (Animation)
- Sue Amoddio (Lyricist)
- Chris Anastasiades (Lyricist)
- Ray Boseley (Lyricist)
- Christine Madafferi (Lyricist)
- Robert Greenberg (Lyricist)
- Cameron Clarke (Lyricist)
- Susie Campbell (Lyricist)

==== Lift Off Live ====
- Chris Neal (Music Director, Music, Lyrics, Score, and Head of Music Production)
- Chris Anastassiades (Lyricist)
- Garth Boomer (Lyricist)
- Ray Boseley (Lyricist)
- Robert Greenberg (Lyricist)
- Sue Amoddio (Lyricist)

=== Recording and editing process ===
In the first series, the recording process for the Wakadoo puppet songs was unorthodox. Pioneered by director Paul Nichola, the vocals were recorded live during shooting to give more character to the performances. While a good idea in practice, this meant extensive work was required to clean up the vocal tracks for future soundtrack releases, which was successfully accomplished for the two 1992 albums Songs from Lift-Off 1 and More Songs from Lift-Off 2. Some songs, such as 'All Together Now', 'The Hot Seven Song', and 'Wanting', were recorded entirely in the studio. In the second series, all songs were recorded in the studio to avoid potential sync problems and other issues. This allowed vocalists to concentrate solely on their singing, shifting the focus more towards the audible performance rather than the visual.

Many songs on the two aforementioned albums, while more technically polished, were truncated or shortened for unknown reasons. Alternate vocal takes were used for some songs, including some not performed by the original artists, most notably 'Out of Order' and 'The Wheel Turns'. It is believed these were original scratch tracks produced by Mike Brady, though the vocalists remain unknown. Some songs featured fade-out endings despite having been produced with proper endings as heard in the television episodes. The albums for the second series were presented as more accurate, full-length soundtracks. David Cheshire was the music editor for the series and created various long and short versions of the songs using the old-fashioned method of splicing tape with a razor blade. He was also one of the first musicians in Australia to use the Pro-Tools system, which he employed to create shorter versions of the theme songs for every episode.

=== Music rights issues and reissues of the albums ===
John Hopkins of Screensong Pty Ltd owned the publishing and phonographic rights to all songs and music in the series. Many composers reported that he either paid them no royalties at all or only for a short period. Unfortunately, many were unable to be compensated during the series' production, leading to numerous internal complications. Hopkins fled overseas toward the end of the 1990s and has not made contact with the original composers since.

In 2021, the publishing and phonographic rights were obtained by Joseph Marshall, owner and operator of the indie record label Silbert Records. Marshall, with the blessing of the original composers, Dr. Patricia Edgar, and others heavily involved in the production of Lift Off, began the process of restoring all the songs and demo versions to their original forms. This effort was intended to ensure the composers and lyricists received proper royalties and to recirculate the Lift Off music. Where restoration was impossible, new recordings were created. In 2022, the original musical cast recording for Lift Off Live was released digitally in a remastered form with several bonus and previously unreleased tracks. This album was shortly followed by Songs from Lift-Off 1 (The Chris Neal Collection), featuring all of Chris Neal's songs for the series and previously unheard demo versions of each track. Both albums are distributed by Silbert Records, with more planned to follow.

== Success ==
Lift Off began airing on the ABC on 8 May 1992. Screened at 2:00 pm on Fridays, it was also repeated after school at 4:30 pm on weekdays from 29 June 1992 and on Saturday evenings from September 1992. The Foundation received a substantial amount of Lift Off fan mail from both children and adults.

=== Re-screenings ===
==== Lift Off ====
- Weekly on the ABC from July through September 1993.
- In the 4:30 pm weekday time slot on the ABC on 7 September 1994.
- On the ABC from 7 July to 25 October 1994, in the 4:30 pm weekday time slot.

==== Lift Off series 1 & 2 ====
- The ABC screened Lift Off 2 at 4:30 pm on weekdays from 17 February 1995 and weekly at 8:30 am on Sundays from 4 April 1995.
- Lift Off 2 re-screened weekly on the ABC at 8:00 am on Sunday mornings for 26 weeks from 6 August 1995.
- Lift Off, in its one-hour format, screened on the ABC at 1:00 pm on Thursdays from 1 August 1996. This was immediately followed by Lift Off 2, concluding on 24 April 1997.
- Lift Off 2 screened on the ABC at 8:00 am on Sundays from 30 June 1996 in its half-hour format.
- Lift Off 2 screened in its half-hour format at 7:30 am on Sundays on the ABC from 13 April 1997 and concluded on 5 October 1997.
- The ABC screened episodes from Lift Off 2 on Sunday mornings at 7:30 am from 6 July 1997 until 5 October 1997.
- The ABC repeated Lift Off 2 for the sixth time during the school holidays in December 1998 and January 1999.
- Disney Channel Australia screened Lift Off series 1 and 2 twice daily on weekdays at 9:30 am and 2:00 pm continuously from 1 February 1999 until 11 April 2000. Both series were screened a total of three times by Disney Channel during this extensive period.
- The ABC screened 11 episodes of Lift Off 2 at 10:00 am on weekdays from 27 September 1999 until 11 October 1999.

=== Sales ===
==== 1994 ====
As of 30 June 1994, ABC Enterprises reported sales of 1,391 Lift Off videotapes, with the most popular titles being The Story of EC, EC and the Lift Off Kids, and Nipper & Aku.

The Curriculum Corporation distributed educational guides to Lift Off. By 30 June 1994, 268 Teachers' Guide to Lift Off books had been sold, as well as almost 800 Lift Off educational book and video packs.

In the UK, the show was aired on Channel 4.

==== 1995 ====
ABC Enterprises reported sales of 23,475 Lift Off videos and 13,240 Lift Off CDs/audiocassettes by 30 June 1995.

Reed for Kids sold over 140,788 Lift Off storybooks and activity books by 30 June 1995.

Both series of Lift Off were sold to TV12 Singapore, and the first series was sold to Television Airtime Services in Malaysia.

Canal J, a children's channel in France, acquired all 78 episodes of Lift Off series 1 and 2, and dubbed them into French.

Coral Pictures entered into an agreement with the Foundation to distribute the Lift Off series in Spanish-speaking territories and dubbed the series into Spanish. Subsequent sales were made to broadcasters in Mexico, Panama, and Argentina.

Middle East Media acquired the Lift Off series for Arabic-speaking territories.

ABC for Kids released the video Imagine EC and Me in June 1995 and planned to release further titles over the following 12 months. They also released two CDs/audiocassettes of the Lift Off 2 music: Wakadoo Rap and Brand New Songs From Lift Off.

==== 1996 ====
FOXTEL acquired pay television rights for the 52 episodes of Lift Off 1 and EC Plays Lift Off for its Fox Kids Network.

ABC Video released Imagine, EC & Me from the Lift Off 2 series on the video sell-through market.

==== 1997 ====
Lift Off 1 was sold to Sri Lanka. Lift Off series 1 and 2 were sold to Canal J France, Cook Islands, Panama, and Argentina. The Foundation entered into an agreement with Daro Film Distribution for the distribution of both series in Eastern Europe.

==== 1998 ====
Lift Off 1 was sold to the Italian public broadcaster RAI, the Namibian Broadcasting Corporation, and the Tzu Chi Television Network in Taiwan. Canal J broadcast both series 1 and 2 daily in France (where Lift Off was known as Zig Zag). Following Canal J's success, both series were sold to the French-language broadcaster Le Canal Famille in Canada. The Spanish-language broadcaster Telemundo Network in the United States acquired both series, as did Multivision Mexico (for pay television across Spanish-speaking Latin America). Lift Off 2 was also sold to the Saskatchewan Communications Network in Canada.

==== 1999 ====
Carlo Television in Sri Lanka acquired more episodes of the Lift Off series.

Disney Channel Australia acquired the Lift Off series.

Delta Music Plc in the United Kingdom released the Lift Off series on video.

==== 2000 ====
Lift Off series 1 and 2 were sold to GMTV in the United Kingdom, and NRK Norway re-licensed the Thrash animated segments from Lift Off 2.

== Cast ==
=== Children ===
- Poss Burke – Erin Pratten: A blonde-haired, blue-eyed young girl. Poss is Nipper and Annie's big sister and the Burkes' eldest child.
- Nipper Burke – Cameron J Smith: A blonde-haired, blue-eyed little boy. Nipper is Poss's little brother, Annie's big brother, and the Burkes' middle child.
- Annie Burke – Nikita Plummer (Series 2): A blonde-haired, blue-eyed preschool-aged girl. Annie is Poss and Nipper's little sister and the Burkes' youngest child. Up until series 2, Annie was known as "Baby Annie".
- Paul Jordan – Luke Carroll: A brown-haired, brown-eyed, Aboriginal young boy. He is Aku's older half-brother and the Jordans' eldest child.
- Aku Jordan – Aku Bielicki: A brown-haired, brown-eyed, half-Aboriginal, half-African-American little girl. She is Paul's little half-sister and the Jordans' youngest child.
- Turbo Garcia – Heber Yerien (Series 1): A brown-haired, brown-eyed adolescent boy who assists Snap Jordan in her "fix it" business. He is Max's older brother and the Garcias' eldest child.
- Max Garcia – Robert Peschel: A brown-haired, brown-eyed young boy who is deaf and requires a hearing aid. He is Turbo's little brother and the Garcias' youngest child.
- Marco Ponti – Mario Filintatzis (Series 2): A brown-haired, brown-eyed, disabled little boy who occasionally requires a wheelchair. He is Raph's and "Baby Ponti's" older brother and the Pontis' eldest child. He and his family move into the Garcias' apartment at the very beginning of the first episode in series 2 ("Brand New").
- Raph Ponti – Jared Daperis (Series 2): A brown-haired, brown-eyed preschool-aged boy. He is Marco's little brother, "Baby Ponti's" older brother, and the Pontis' middle child. He and his family move into the Garcias' apartment at the very beginning of the first episode in series 2 ("Brand New").
- Kim Stinson – Maria Nguyen: A young Asian girl who was adopted. She is the Stinsons' only child.

=== Adults ===
- Jenny Burke – Madeleine Blackwell: Poss, Nipper, and Annie's mother.
- Ted Burke – David Sandford: Poss, Nipper, and Annie's father, who works as a musician, singer, and songwriter.
- Snap Jordan – Aku Kadogo (Series 1): Aku's biological mother and Paul's stepmother, who is of African-American descent. She runs a "fix it" business alongside Turbo. She is replaced by her husband James (Paul and Aku's biological father) after moving back to the United States in series 2.
- James Jordan – Lafe Charlton (Series 2): Paul and Aku's biological father, who is of Aboriginal descent. He replaces his wife Snap in the "fix it" business.
- Teresa Garcia – Irini Pappas (Series 1): Turbo and Max's mother.
- Ricardo Garcia – Petru Gheorghiu (Series 1): Turbo and Max's father.
- Carla Ponti – Nadia Coreno (Series 2): Marco and Raph's mother.
- Franco Ponti – John Orcsik (Series 2): Marco and Raph's father, who works as a firefighter.
- Stella Stinson – Louise Le Nay: Kim's adoptive mother, who works as a real estate agent.
- Harry Stinson – Alan Fletcher: Kim's adoptive father, who works as an architect.
- Mr. (Seymour) Fish – Mark Mitchell: One of the most memorable characters and the major antagonist of Lift Off. Reminiscent of Oscar the Grouch in Sesame Street but acting as an authority figure, Mr. Fish was the strict, narcissistic, and snobbish caretaker of the small apartment building where the characters lived. He always took things very seriously and was often seen yelling at the children from behind his desk in the apartment foyer when they came inside. He owned numerous "no" signs, which he used to threaten the children. In the series finale ("From Where I Stand"), he confiscated EC and felt guilty about it. While tossing and turning in bed with a cold, EC came to him (the only time EC moved in front of an adult), calmed him down, and gave him a dream about what it would have been like if he had EC in his childhood. After the dream, he returned EC to the children in exchange for a telescope. The final shot showed him looking wistful as he watched a happier childhood version of himself holding EC.
- "Mumsy" Fish – Mark Mitchell: Mr. Fish's mother, who constantly drops in unannounced to check on him. Despite the fact that he is an adult, Mumsy treats him as if he were a child, much to Mr. Fish's embarrassment and disgust. Throughout the series, it is implied that she would not allow Seymour to run around and get dirty when he was young.
- Bonza Men – Matt Quartermaine and Matt Parkinson: One-off guest characters played by the comedy duo Empty Pockets.

=== Puppet characters ===
Character	Puppeteer
Boris	John Rogers
Morris	David Collins (Series 1); Sean Masterson (Series 2)
Doris	Janette Dalgliesh (Series 1); Megan Cameron (Series 2)
Wolf	Hugh Simpson (Series 1); Frank Italiano (Series 2)
Boss	Liza-Mare Syron
Nearly	Philip Millar (Series 1); Malcolm Martin (Series 2)
Zelda	Liz Rule
Cook	Will Conyers (Series 1, voice and dominant hand); Peter Wilson (Series 1, opposite hand); Rod Primrose (Series 2, voice and dominant hand); Bob Parsons (Series 2, opposite hand)
Lonely	Peter Wilson (Series 1, voice and dominant hand) Roy McNeill (Series 1, opposite hand); Bob Parsons (Series 2)
Oscar the Orange Ocelot	Frank Italiano (Series 2)
EC	Peter Wilson (Series 1); Bob Parsons (Series 2)
Beverley	Peter Wilson (Series 1); Bob Parsons (Series 2)
Rocky	Will Conyers (Series 1, voice); Peter Wilson (Series 1, live action segments); John Rogers (Series 2, voice); Bob Parsons (Series 2, live action segments)
Mocki	Liz Rule
Gnocchi	Janette Dalgliesh (Series 1); Frank Italiano (Series 2)
Rapsak	Hugh Simpson (Series 1)
Snapsak	Liz Rule
Dippisak	David Collins (Series 1)
Tweesak	Janette Dalgliesh (Series 1)
Grumblesak	Janette Dalgliesh (Series 1)
Gabblesak	Hugh Simpson (Series 1)
Scruffsak	David Collins (Series 1)

Assistant puppeteers included Roy McNeill, Heather Monk, Rod Primrose, Jenny Sherlock, Michelle Spooner, Sue Blakey, Jenny Ishmakovich, and Liss Gabb.

Lotis (voiced by Julie Forsyth) is a computer-programmed, artificially intelligent, magical lift in the apartment building. She tries to help the younger characters with their personal problems but cannot understand more complex human behavior and thinking.

Beverley is a one-eyed plant that lives in the apartment foyer. She shows short documentary clips about the episode's subject matter. (Beverley was puppeteered by Peter Wilson in the first series, and Bob Parsons in the second).

EC (meaning "Every Child", formerly "Elizabeth and Charlie") is an animated, magical rag doll intended to appear genderless or non-binary to be more widely relatable. Initially, EC stood for "Elizabeth and Charlie", the names Poss and Kim gave to the doll in the first episode ("A Load of Rubbish"), before "Every Child" was universally adopted. (EC was puppeteered by Peter Wilson in the first series, and Bob Parsons in the second).

Rocky the Frill-Necked Lizard is the leader of a colony of frilled-neck lizards. Rocky spies on the humans ("two-footers") and reports his findings to the rest of the colony. (Rocky was puppeteered by Will Conyers and Peter Wilson in the first series, and John Rogers and Bob Parsons in the second).

The Backsacks are the children's backpacks that come to life and speak through their zipper mouths. There are seven in total, each owned by one of the seven children. Each Backsack has a unique personality. When Max and Turbo move to the country in series 2, their backsacks, Gabblesak and Grumblesak, are passed along to Raph and Marco. When Paul gets too old for his backsack, Dippisak, he passes him along to Annie, Poss and Nipper's younger sister. They are:

- Rapsak: Poss's backsack. He looks like a bug's head due to the antennae sticking out. As his name suggests, he speaks with a Rastafarian accent, despite his straight, black flat-top hair and light pigmentation. (Puppeteered by Hugh Simpson in the first series).
- Snapsak: Nipper's backsack. Covered in animal prints—leopard/jaguar print on her chin and lower jaw, and tiger print on her upper jaw, cheeks, and forehead—and speaking with a Victorian accent, Snapsak has the personality of an old-fashioned, middle-aged, posh lady. (Puppeteered by Liz Rule).
- Dippisak: Paul's backsack in series 1 and Annie's backsack in series 2. He has red sides with white spots, a dark and light blue striped forehead, a red zipper nose, medium blue lips, a light blue lower jaw, and red bottle-lid eyes. He appears cross-eyed and is slightly shy, nervous, and embarrassed when conversing with the other backsacks. (Puppeteered by David Collins in the first series).
- Tweesak: Aku's backsack. She has light pigmentation, straight golden-brown flat-top hair, blue button eyes, and a two-tone jacket: pink with blue spots on her left side and blue with pink triangles on her right side. True to her name, she speaks with a pronounced Georgian British accent. (Puppeteered by Janette Dalgliesh in the first series).
- Grumblesak: Turbo's backsack in series 1 and Marco's backsack in series 2. Due to role changes between series, Grumblesak's gender is ambiguous or non-binary. As their name suggests, they have an attitude problem when conversing with the other backsacks. They also consider themselves the "grandmaster", main leader, and oldest of all the backsacks. (Puppeteered by Janette Dalgliesh in the first series).
- Gabblesak: Max's backsack in series 1 and Raph's backsack in series 2. He is golden-brown with a purple nose, green lips, and orange hair. He is the only backsack with just one eye, and he speaks with an American accent. As his name suggests, he can be very loud and often raises his voice at the other backsacks. (Puppeteered by Hugh Simpson in the first series).
- Scruffsak: Kim's backsack. He is blue with orange curly hair. Living up to his name, he has scattered "teeth" and can be somewhat confusing in conversations, often misinterpreting negative things as positive. (Puppeteered by David Collins in the first series).

==== Wakadoo Café puppet characters ====
- Boris: The ugliest and most ignorant of the three pigs. (Puppeteered by John Rogers).
- Morris: Slightly less antagonizing than Boris, but still a pain. (Puppeteered by David Collins in the first series and Sean Masterson in the second).
- Doris: The only female pig, but just as aggravating as Boris and Morris. (Puppeteered by Janette Dalgliesh in the first series and Megan Cameron in the second).
- Wolf: Employed as an entertainer alongside the three pigs, despite their love/hate relationship. Though self-centered and arrogant on the outside, he has been known to show his kind side, proving he has a good heart on the inside. (Puppeteered by Hugh Simpson in the first series and Frank Italiano in the second).
- Boss: The strict manager of the café. It is not uncommon for the café's employees to hold a grudge against her, though this never lasts long; despite her rudeness, Boss's good side often shines through in the end. Her real name is Hortense. She speaks with an upper-class Australian accent and wears a golden crown. (Puppeteered by Liza-Mare Syron).
- Nearly: A kind-hearted yet clumsy, "hairy-from-head-to-toe" member of the group. He is in charge of drinks. Nearly is prone to depression and is very nervous around others. (Puppeteered by Philip Millar in the first series and Malcolm Martin in the second).
- Zelda: Nearly's sister. She works as a waitress and is very popular among the café's customers. (Puppeteered by Liz Rule).
- Cook: A true French artiste and seemingly the café's only kitchen employee. He is very sensitive, especially about his cooking, but is respected by the others. (Puppeteered by Will Conyers and Peter Wilson in the first series, and Rod Primrose and Bob Parsons in the second).
- Lonely: A quiet and shy character who does not appear to have any friends, though he claims to be waiting for someone and has been doing so for a very long time. (Puppeteered by Peter Wilson and Roy McNeill in the first series, and Bob Parsons in the second).
- Oscar the Orange Ocelot: A criminal ocelot in disguise who camouflages himself and frames others to stay out of trouble. Despite this, he was once Lonely's friend. (Puppeteered by Frank Italiano in the second series).

== Episodes ==
=== Series 1 (1992) ===
Series one premiered on 8 May 1992.

Episode 1 and 2: A Load of Old Rubbish (8 May 1992)

Episode 3 and 4: Destroy (15 May 1992)

Episode 5 and 6: Which One? (22 May 1992)

Episode 7 and 8: That's Not Fair (29 May 1992)

Episode 9 and 10: Because It Feels Good (5 June 1992)

Episode 11 and 12: Into The Unknown (12 June 1992)

Episode 13 and 14: Once I Grew (19 June 1992)

Episode 15 and 16: Something Tells Me (26 June 1992)

Episode 17 and 18: The Wheel Turns (3 July 1992)

Episode 19 and 20: Out of Order (10 July 1992)

Episode 21 and 22: Above and Beyond (17 July 1992)

Episode 23 and 24: I Can! (24 July 1992)

Episode 25 and 26: Remember (31 July 1992)

Episode 27 and 28: Clash (7 August 1992)

Episode 29 and 30: For Sale (14 August 1992)

Episode 31 and 32: Face (21 August 1992)

Episode 33 and 34: Going Under (28 August 1992)

Episode 35 and 36: Illusion Is All (4 September 1992)

Episode 37 and 38: Beneath The Skin (11 September 1992)

Episode 39 and 40: Real Friends (18 September 1992)

Episode 41 and 42: Lost (25 September 1992)

Episode 43 and 44: Funday (2 October 1992)

Episode 45 and 46: No Entry (9 October 1992)

Episode 47 and 48: Wanting (16 October 1992)

Episode 49 and 50: Threads (23 October 1992)

Episode 51 and 52: All Together Now (30 October 1992)

=== Series 2 (1995) ===
Series two premiered on 17 February 1995.

Episode 53 and 54: Brand New (17 February 1995 and 20 February 1995)

Episode 55 and 56: Under Pressure (21 February 1995 and 22 February 1995)

Episode 57 and 58: What's Missing (23 February 1995 and 24 February 1995)

Episode 59 and 60: My World (27 February 1995 and 28 February 1995)

Episode 61 and 62: Would I Lie (1 March 1995 and 2 March 1995)

Episode 63 and 64: Give and Take (3 March 1995 and 6 March 1995)

Episode 65 and 66: Far Out (7 March 1995 and 8 March 1995)

Episode 67 and 68: Out of This World (9 March 1995 and 10 March 1995)

Episode 69 and 70: Shape I'm In (13 March 1995 and 14 March 1995)

Episode 71 and 72: Heroes (15 March 1995 and 16 March 1995)

Episode 73 and 74: In Your Shoes (17 March 1995 and 20 March 1995)

Episode 75 and 76: Not Alone (21 March 1995 and 22 March 1995)

Episode 77 and 78: From Where I Stand (23 March 1995 and 24 March 1995)

== Other Lift Off materials and shows ==
=== Lift Off Live! The Musical ===
Lift Off Live! The Musical combined some of the most popular elements of Lift Off while maintaining its strong educational focus. It opened on 4 January 1995 to a packed house at the Sydney Opera House, presented by the ACTF in association with Back Row Productions Pty Ltd and the Fox Kids Network. It went on to tour Melbourne, Adelaide, Brisbane, Perth, and various rural towns during 1996. The show was performed 40 times over 20 days to an average audience capacity of 80%. Fox Kids Network was a sponsor of the Sydney season.

The musical was based on the Wakadoo Café—a story of friendship and betrayal, unity and division. Mr. Fish (Mark Mitchell) and Lotis (the highly intelligent talking lift) stumble into the Wakadoo Café. Mr. Fish confronts the Wakadoo regulars—Wolf; Boris, Morris, and Doris; Boss; Zelda; Lonely; and EC. Mr. Fish seeks trouble while EC and children in the audience try to stop him.

A wealth of theatre experience was brought to the production. Produced by the Foundation's Director, Dr. Patricia Edgar, and Helena Harris (whose credits included EC Plays Lift Off and Bananas in Pyjamas), the show was directed by Wayne Harrison and designed by Kim Carpenter, both from the Sydney Theatre Company. Composer Chris Neal had more than fifteen years of experience composing music for television and feature films, and choreographer Tony Bartuccio's career spanned more than thirty years. Garth Boomer worked with composer Chris Neal to develop the story and songs. Nine new songs were created for the show.

Activity notes featuring activities and games based on the musical were written by primary school specialist Shirley Sydenham. The notes were published by the Foundation alongside a copy of the musical theatre script and a compact disc featuring the music from the show. The materials were published to coincide with the commencement of the Melbourne season at the end of June 1996.

=== EC Plays Lift Off ===
EC Plays Lift Off was a 13-episode game show with strong links to Lift Off, produced by the Foundation in association with the ABC over two weeks in December 1993 at the ABC studios in Melbourne. It was developed from a concept by Patricia Edgar, Susie Campbell, and Paul Nichola. The series was produced by Helena Harris and directed by Stephen Jones. Otello Stolfo, who designed the Lift Off Wakadoo Café, designed the game show set. Bernadette Wynack was the Art Director, and Deborah Allen created the game tasks.

Starring in the series was Mark Mitchell, reprising his role as Mr. Fish from Lift Off to host the game show. Also appearing in each program were EC, as the instigator of the show, and the Wakadoo Café's wolf and three pigs, who were seen enjoying the game in front of their television at home.

On each show, two teams of children aged 6 to 11 took part in games related to Lift Off. As each team completed a task, they were awarded a patch. The first team to cover their game board with patches was the winning team.

It was produced toward the end of 1993 in association with the Australian Broadcasting Corporation (ABC). It screened on the ABC at 8:30 am on Sundays from 10 April 1994 to 4 July 1994, and re-screened at 10:15 am on weekdays from 4 July 1995.

=== Lift Off to Distance Education ===
Following inquiries from schools of distance education around Australia, the printed materials written for the Lift Off to Distance Education project were made available on computer disk for each state and territory. This assisted with the incorporation of the materials into early childhood curriculum programs where possible. The Open Training and Education Network (OTEN) in New South Wales trialed this with sections of their school community.

=== Lift Off to Fire Safety ===
The video and book package Lift Off to Fire Safety was officially launched on Monday, 9 October 1995, at the Metropolitan Fire Brigade's Eastern Hill Fire Station and Museum. The package was sent free of charge to every primary school in Australia during National Fire Safety Week. This project was made possible by two major sponsors, Ramsay Health Care and BRK Brands (makers of First Alert smoke detectors).

In November, a competition was held in conjunction with the mail-out of the educational materials to all primary schools. Over 200 schools across Australia entered, and state winners were selected with entries judged by BRK Brands and the ACTF. The winning schools each received a prize of First Alert fire safety products. The materials were then made available for purchase from the Foundation.

=== Lift Off Interactive ===
The Foundation and Deakin University constructed a prototype module of the Lift Off game concept for CD-ROM in 1997. The project aimed to create a meaningful training environment for postgraduate students at Deakin University while exploring the potential for a commercial product for the Foundation. The Foundation was committed to establishing links with government training schemes and exploring mutually beneficial partnerships with trainees for the emerging new media industry.

=== Teachers Online ===
This was a web-based resource of learning activities based on the Foundation's programs. Developed for use in primary and secondary schools, all learning activities were linked to the nationally agreed Curriculum Statements and Profiles. It included 13 theme-based learning activities for middle primary and seven activities centered around teaching viewing for teachers of lower and middle primary years.

== Awards and nominations ==
Lift Off
Year	Nominated work	Award Event	Category	Result	Reference
1992	'Something Tells Me' episode	AFI Awards, Melbourne	Best Children's Television Drama	Nominated	
1992	'A Load of Old Rubbish' episode	AFI Awards, Melbourne	Best Children's Television Drama	Winner	
1992	Lift Off series	United Nations Association of Australia Media Peace Awards, Canberra	Major Award in the Children's category	Winner	
1993	Lift Off series	TV World Marketing Awards, Cannes, France	Best Marketing by an Independent sponsored by BBC enterprises	Winner	

Lift Off 2
Year	Nominated work	Award Event	Category	Result	Reference
1995	'Smelly the Clown' episode	Annecy Animation Festival, France	________________________	Selected in competition	
1995	'Heroes' episode and 'Lift-Off to Fire Safety' package	Hoso Bunka Foundation	Excellence in pre-school Programming	Winner	
1995	'Heroes' episode and 'Lift-Off to Fire Safety' package	The Japan Prize Contest, Tokyo	1996 Japan Prize circulating library	Selected as one of seven programs	
1995	Lift Off 2	38th New York Festival Television Programming Awards	Bronze World Medal in Youth Programming, Series, Age 7–12 category	Bronze World Medal in Youth programming	
1996	Lift Off 2	6th Cairo International Film Festival for Children, Egypt	Golden Cairo for Television Programmes	Winner	
1996	'Lift-Off to Fire Safety' package	Australian Teachers of Media Awards (ATOM), Melbourne	Education Resource	Finalist	
1996	'Lift-Off to Fire Safety' package	The Chris Awards, 44th Columbus International Film & Video Festival, United States	Education & Instruction: Safety Category	Honourable Mention	
1997	'Lift-Off to Fire Safety' package	Video Fuego Festival, Spain	________________________	Honourable Mention	
1998	Lift Off 2	Prix Jeunesse, Munich	Television Series	Finalist	
2000	'I Think' episode	ATOM Awards, Melbourne	Primary Student Education Resource	Winner	
2000	'I Can' episode	China Central TV, 24 hr Children's Festival	________________________	Selected for entry into festival with twenty other programs from around the world (program rated third highest on the day)	

== Reviews ==
=== Lift Off ===
- "Lift Off promises to be one of the most adventurous uses of television of the 90s." — James Cockington, The Sydney Morning Herald, 30 December 1991
- "It is no exaggeration to say that Lift Off is the most exciting project in the history of children's television." — The West Magazine, The West Australian, Perth, 2 May 1992
- "If time, money and creative energy count for anything, Lift Off must be regarded as the most important piece of television made in Australia." — TV Guide, The Herald-Sun, Melbourne, 8 May 1992
- "Lift Off...has already won an army of viewers." — The Sunday Times, Perth, 31 May 1992
- "Very occasionally something comes along, even in its early and most unformed stages, causes the hairs on the back of the neck to prickle with excitement: suddenly you realise you are witnessing something Very Special Indeed...There is a lot more to Lift Off than mere fun and education...this one should run and run." — Diane Simmonds, The Bulletin, 5 May 1992
- "The most ambitious and satisfying children's series ever produced in Australia." — Sunday Telegraph, Sydney, 3 May 1992
- "At last, something challenging and creative for our youngest viewers!...As a lecturer and researcher specialising in children's television, I recommend Lift Off to parents, children, and teachers as superb entertainment and as a learning resource." — Lee Burton, Green Guide, The Age, 21 May 1992
- "It will revolutionise children's viewing." — Mary Maxwell, The Weekly Times, Melbourne, 29 April 1929
- "The consistent highlight of kids' viewing...will be...Lift Off." — The Sunday Age, Melbourne, 10 May 1992
- "A new era in children's television is about to begin." — Mirjana Jovetic, TV Guide, The Herald-Sun, Melbourne, 6 May 1992
- "It is difficult to do justice to these programs, so much talent and energy has gone into them." — Dennis Pryor, The Age, Melbourne, 30 May 1992
- "This is dazzling kids entertainment centred on many an educational and environmental message, and the sheer creativity behind it all is-to use a word popular among the age group at which it is aimed-awesome." — Laurie Masterson, TV Week, 9 May 1992
- "Lift Off, a lively mix of drama, animation and puppetry...looks set for success." — Green Guide, The Age, 7 May 1992
- "Lift Off was extraordinarily good." — First Lady, Mrs. Barbara Bush, The Canberra Times, 4 January 1992
- "...brilliant new series...its success is assured." — Mark Wallace, Canberra Times, 4 May 1992
- "An inspired children's education programme." — The Advocate, Burnie, 4 May 1992

=== Lift Off Live! ===
==== Sydney Season ====
- "The best kids activity in Sydney this summer." — Radio 2UE
- "It's a hit." — Sunday Telegraph, 7 January 1996
- "Lift Off Live is a classy and riotously funny piece of kids' theatre...this show has moments of real theatrical magic between the thigh-slapping comedy and audience interaction." — The Sydney Morning Herald, 8 January 1996
- "Lift Off Live rips merrily along song, dance, big-laugh silliness, a production whole-heartedly focused on its pint sized audience." — The Sun-Herald, 7 January 1996
- "...this children's musical was a hit from start to finish." — Weekly Southern Courier, 16 January 1996
- "Lift Off Live...has the audience dancing in the aisles...Lots of fun." — Daily Telegraph Mirror, 15 January 1996

==== Melbourne season ====
- "...pure school holiday entertainment." — Herald Sun, 2 July 1996
- "...a pretty sophisticated piece of children's theatre...kids can really yell their lungs out in this one." — Sunday Age, 7 July 1996
- "...outrageous and colourful fun." — The Age Entertainment Guide, 5 July 1996

== Discography ==
- Songs from Lift-Off 1 (1992) – ABC Music
- More Songs from Lift-Off 2 (1992) – ABC Music
- Wakadoo Café (1993) – ABC Music
- EC's Favourite Songs (1993) – ABC Music
- Songs and Stories from Lift-Off (1994) – ABC Music
- Wakadoo Rap and Other Songs and Stories from Lift-Off 2 (1995) – ABC Music
- Brand New Songs from Lift-Off (1995) – ABC Music
- Lift-Off Live: Songs from the Musical (1995) – ACTF Records
- Lift-Off Live: Songs from the Musical [Remastered Original Cast Recording] (2022) – Silbert Records
- Songs from Lift-Off [The Chris Neal Collection] (2022) – Silbert Records

== Videography ==
- Lift-Off at the Wakadoo Café (1992) – ABC Video
- The Story of E.C. (1992) – ABC Video
- Mr. Fish and Lotis (1992) – ABC Video
- The Animated Stories (1992) – ABC Video
- EC, Nipper and Aku (1993) – ABC Video
- Songs from Lift-Off (1993) – ABC Video
- EC and the Lift-Off Kids (1993) – ABC Video
- EC, Poss and Kim (1994) – ABC Video
- Imagine, EC and Me (1995) – ABC Video
- Lift-Off To Fire Safety (1995) – ACTF
