= Unreal (short story collection) =

Short story collection by Paul Jennings

- First edition (publ. Penguin Australia)
- Author: Paul Jennings
- Genre: Short story collection
- Publisher: Penguin Australia
- Publication date: June 6, 1985
- Followed by: Unbelievable

Unreal is the first in a series of collections of short stories by Australian author Paul Jennings. It was first released on June 6, 1985.

== The stories ==
=== Without a Shirt ===
A boy called Brian has a speech impediment that forces him to say "Without a shirt" each time he finishes a sentence. When he is forced to move to a new house in the center of a cemetery because his dog is repeatedly digging, he eventually finds some bones that may be linked to his speech impediment. After fulfilling the task involving the bones and a shirt, he loses the speech impediment. Was later adapted as an episode of Round The Twist, although "without a shirt" was changed to "without my pants".

=== The Strap-Box Flyer ===
A conniving salesman named Giffen sells a glue that will stick to anything, but stops working after four hours. After getting many innocent townspeople to buy it, he leaves town in his truck before they can track him down for cheating them, then meets a man who has invented a box that can make people fly into the sky. Attempting to try it for himself leads to the biggest mistake of his life.

=== Skeleton on the Dunny ===
A boy called Bob was forced to live with his aunt because of his parents' deaths, but the only toilet at his aunt's house is in an outhouse. Even worse, that outhouse is haunted by the ghost of a man who was dead after looking after the house when the aunt was on a holiday. Was later adapted as the first episode of Round The Twist.

=== Lucky Lips ===
A boy called Marcus who has never been kissed obtains a lipstick that will make nearby girls kiss him. However, it also works on any female, including animals. Was later adapted as an episode of Round The Twist.

=== Cow Dung Custard ===
A boy called Greg has a father who grows vegetables that are tremendous because of all the dung he uses to grow them. The worst batches are one that cannot be smelled, but attracts flies, and one that smells so incredibly bad that it gets him in trouble with the neighbours, but also kills flies. At the end, Greg and his father get into trouble. Adapted as an episode of Wormwood.

=== Lighthouse Blues ===
A boy called Anton comes to an island to help an old lighthouse keeper. However, every Friday night, music plays, and the boy suspects it has something to do with the lighthouse keeper's ancestors. Stan (the lighthouse keeper) is the son of the captain’s son. He is unable to hear the music because it was his ancestors' music. The boy is unable to see the body of the ancestors when he visits the music room. The boy tells the bad news to the invisible ancestors and they do not respond because they are ghosts but they listen. The bad news is that they were going to break the lighthouse and make a new one but they tried their hardest not to let them break it. Was later adapted as an episode of Round The Twist.

=== Smart Ice-Cream ===
An ice-cream seller named Mr. Peppi sells ice creams that produce effects such as making people happier, shortening noses, removing pimples, and increasing intelligence. A student who routinely achieves top grades is excluded from receiving the ice cream, and after a classmate achieves similar grades, he destroys Mr. Peppi's stock except for the ice cream that affects intelligence. He consumes that ice cream, which actually decreases intelligence.

=== Wunderpants ===
A boy called David is given underpants that, despite their look that would cause him to be teased by the school bully, give him superhuman strength. But when he takes a break during a cross-country race (he is first by a wide margin), those underpants start to shrink, and the bully eventually comes to steal the rest of his clothes. He ends up going home in the nude, causing him to be grounded, but he eventually enters a mouse race in which the winner gets 50 dollars. David wins the mouse race by giving his pet mouse the pants. Was later adapted as an episode of Round The Twist.
