= Uncanny (short story collection) =

1988 short story collection by Paul Jennings

- First edition (publ. Puffin Books)
- Author: Paul Jennings
- Genre: Short story collection
- Publisher: Puffin Books
- Publication date: 1988
- Preceded by: Quirky Tails
- Followed by: Unbearable

Uncanny is the fourth in a series of collections of short stories by Australian author Paul Jennings. It was first released in 1988.

== The stories ==
=== On the Bottom ===
When a boy called Lucas goes fishing with his father, he finds a severed finger with a bear tattoo on it. This tattoo comes to life and directs the boy to its former owner, who is covered with tattoos; all of those tattoos then come to life and attach themselves to the boy. Was adapted as an episode Driven Crazy and was renamed to "Barely There."

=== A Good Tip for Ghosts ===
When twin brothers move to a new school, the bully, James Gribble, forces them to go to a haunted garbage tip at night after making them touch a pair of false teeth, or they will be beaten up until they pass the test. But in the end, the ghost who haunts the garbage tip reveals he has been looking for the false teeth. Then, the bully then becomes the victim of the test, as a ghost haunts him as a request from the brothers. Was later adapted as an episode of Round The Twist.

=== Frozen Stiff ===
An old man called Jack Thaw makes a living by collecting dead animals and freezing them in his ice factory. A man called Gravel keeps a cow called Jingle Bells locked in his shed, and a boy tries to get it back to the countryside. Was originally going to be adapted as a Round the Twist episode, but was scrapped for cost reasons and concerns over animal cruelty.

=== UFD ===
A boy called Simon reports seeing a UFO (in actuality a flying dog), but his family does not believe him. He bets his father a thousand dollars if he can prove he saw one, or three years of washing dishes if he can't.

=== Cracking Up ===
A boy called Russell gets many punishments from his angry teacher Mr. Snapper, the worst of which is having to look after the teacher's pot plant for a night. However, the worst part is that two people died in his bedroom at his new house; the spirit of one of them, a boy called Samuel, tickles him, causing him to break the pot plant, then the next day at school, the spirit follows him around; as he is the only one that can see it, he gets in trouble for things that it does.

=== Greensleeves ===
A poor man makes a living by blowing up tree stumps and selling the wood chips as firewood. But when a whale washes ashore, dies, and causes problems for the town, this man and his son Troy are promised a lot of money if he can get rid of it.

=== Mousechap ===
A boy called Julian stays at his aunt and uncle's house. His uncle has started acting like a mouse, so he is locked in the basement. His aunt explains that the uncle had previously invented a machine that acts as a mousetrap, but instead of killing the mouse, it causes it to run away. Similarly, a mouse that has been hiding in Julian's room acts like a person; Julian later finds out that if two animals touch the machine at the same time, their brains get switched. Was later adapted as an episode of Driven Crazy.

=== Spaghetti Pig-out ===
A boy called Matthew is always lonely at school because the school bully never lets anyone associate with him. He is pretty much lonely at home as well because of his lack of technology. But one day, he gets a strange video player whose remote control also works on people. However, the bully eventually steals the remote. Back at school, they both enter a spaghetti-eating contest in which the winner earns a free holiday. The bully, due to eating too much spaghetti via the fast forward function on the remote, throws up and is disqualified from the contest, allowing the boy to win the holiday. Was later adapted as an episode of Round The Twist.

=== Know All ===
A family finds a chest of old circus outfits that cause whoever wears them to gain the abilities of their original owner. The family's scarecrow also gains abilities from being dressed in one of the outfits, however the original owner of this outfit was not a very nice person. Was later adapted as an episode of Round The Twist.
