= Unbelievable (short story collection) =

Short story collection by Paul Jennings

- First edition
- Author: Paul Jennings
- Genre: Short story collection
- Publication date: 1987
- Preceded by: Unreal
- Followed by: Quirky Tails

Unbelievable is the second in a series of collections of short stories by Australian author Paul Jennings. It was first released in 1987.

== The stories ==
=== "Pink Bow Tie" ===
A boy is in trouble for coming to school with white hair, so he has to explain to the principal, who wears a pink bow tie, that it's not his fault, and it's because of the Age Rager, a machine that can make you any age you want.

It was adapted as an episode of Round The Twist.

=== "One-Shot Toothpaste" ===
A dentist tells his patient a story about how he as a boy finds out that his nasty neighbor, Monty, has a bin filled with toothpaste, even though he only has one tooth. So he goes to investigate and finds out that he's testing a type of toothpaste which he calls, "One-Shot Toothpaste" on caged animals. Was adapted as an episode of Driven Crazy.

=== "There's No Such Thing" ===
An old man is forced to go to a nursing home. He can only leave if he can prove the existence of a dragon, so he sends his grandson Chris into the sewer to try and find it, which proves to be a difficult task. Was later adapted as an episode of Round The Twist, one of two adaptions to be combined into a whole episode.

=== "Inside Out" ===
A boy called Gordon who is a fan of horror films and isn't scared of anything leaves his sister Mary at home alone for a night because she has stolen his rented scary movie. He decides to rest for a night at an old house, but it turns out to be the home of a student spook who has an upcoming exam; if the student fails his exam to scare Gordon, he'll be frozen for a few years.

=== "The Busker" ===
A boy called Tony needs money because he wants to go on a date. When his father refuses, he spends the night to find a job so he can get the money. However, he meets an old man who tells him a story of how he worked as a busker when he was younger with his only friend, a little dog named Tiny. He becomes so desperate for friendship that when he wins the lotto and becomes rich, he tries giving the money to people so they will like him. Too late, he realizes that money can never buy true friendship, and that he never appreciated the only real friend he ever had.

=== "Souperman" ===
A boy called Robert who spends his whole school time reading Superman comics is forced to throw them away by his father due to his failing school grades. He then meets a man who resembles Superman, but this superhero gets his powers by drinking soup.

=== "The Gumleaf War" ===
A boy gets his nose stretched in an accident and is sent to his grandfather's house in the country to take his mind off it. However, his grandfather is embroiled in a decades-long feud with another old man, as they are able to transfer illnesses to each other by blowing into magic gumleaves. Later a bushfire burns the tree which had produced the magic leaves. The boy blows the last leaf and his stretched nose is gone.

This story was later adapted as an episode of Round The Twist.

=== "Birdscrap" ===
Twin girls Tracy and Gemma walk to an old house where their late father has hidden rubies. Along the way, they are attacked by seagulls. Was later adapted as an episode of Round The Twist, one of two adaptions to be combined into a whole episode.

=== "Snookle" ===
A boy finds a milk bottle with a pair of eyes inside. The trapped creature (who the boy calls Snookle) is freed by the boy and becomes his servant – however, the boy soon discovers that his new servant helps him far too much, before giving the creature to an old lady who needs a lot of help.
