= Unbearable (short story collection) =

Collection of short stories by Paul Jennings

- First edition (publ. Puffin Books)
- Author: Paul Jennings
- Genre: Short story collection
- Publisher: Puffin Books
- Publication date: 1990
- Preceded by: Uncanny
- Followed by: Unmentionable

Unbearable! More Bizarre Storie is the fifth in a series of collections of short stories by Australian author Paul Jennings, first released in 1990. Half of season 2 of Round The Twist were adaptions of the short stories in this book.

== The stories ==
=== Licked ===
A boy called Andrew who has bad table manners is often criticised by his father during meals. But when a visitor comes for tea, the father has made a promise not to talk about his son's faults, despite the fact that his son tries to make him crack and performs them in the worst ways possible. Was later adapted as an episode of Round The Twist, was one of two adaptions to be combined into one episode.

=== Little Black Balls ===
A girl called Sally tells her mother the story of how she helped one of her friends, who is called the "paper-man" and dresses in newspapers, likes watching the clouds and has many animals for friends, with an operation on a baby kangaroo, and how she lost one of his jewels to a goat. Was later adapted as an episode of Round The Twist, was one of two adaptions to be combined into one episode.

=== Only Gilt ===
A boy called Gary goes to school wearing a bird cage on his head. He explains to his teacher that it is a self-imposed punishment because he blames himself for the murder of his girlfriend's budgerigar, only to find out that the budgerigar had already died before the boy's dog played around with it. The only short story from this book not to be adapted into an episode of Round the Twist.

=== Next Time Around ===
A boy gains the ability to hypnotise chickens. He later tries it on his best friend, then takes it to the next level by making his best friend remember his past life, but with disastrous consequences. Was later adapted as an episode of Round The Twist.

=== Nails ===
A boy called Lehman gets stranded on an island with his father. But he has three other problems: one, he has never seen his mother; two, he is forced to watch his father die; and three, he has nails growing all over him. Was later adapted as an episode of Round The Twist.

=== Yuggles ===
A boy called Pockets enters a mushroom-picking competition to win a large Easter egg for his sick little sister Midge. But all his mushrooms except one get stolen, and that one mushroom has the ability to change shape and scare off mean people. Was later adapted as an episode of Round The Twist.

=== Grandad's Gifts ===
A boy called Shane finds a dead fox in a cupboard in his bedroom. But when he gets a call to pick lemons from his lemon tree and give them to the fox, it seems to come back to life. Was later adapted as an episode of Round The Twist, and also re-published as a picture book with added illustrations.

=== Smelly Feat ===
A boy called Berin who has no sense of smell decides to wear his socks for three straight months, believing that doing so will cause nearby people to fall asleep. It is not just people, even animals are affected. But the person he most wants to use them on is his enemy, who is planning to slaughter his 200-year-old turtle friend. Was later adapted as an episode of Round The Twist.
