= Quirky Tails =

Short story collection by Paul Jennings

- First edition cover
- Author: Paul Jennings
- Genre: Short story collection
- Publisher: Puffin Books
- Publication date: 1987
- Preceded by: Unbelievable
- Followed by: Uncanny

Quirky Tails is the third in a series of short stories by Australian author Paul Jennings. It was first released in 1987.

As one of Jennings' darker collections, death is a theme in many of the stories. This includes "Unhappily Ever After" (which serves as an allegory for hell), "A Dozen Bloomin' Roses" and "No Is Yes".

As such, the collection features the fewest stories to be adapted for the television series Round the Twist.

== The stories ==
=== Sneeze'n Coffin ===
A girl called Tracy's mother remarries an undertaker called Ralph, which embarrasses the girl because he always drives in his hearse, and also because he tells her younger brother that his coffins are boats. As a result, the girl's younger brother launches the coffin into the water, thinking it is a boat and ending up disgracing the family, but the undertaker doesn't even care, which also messes up the girl's life. When the undertaker brings a corpse home from work and the girl gets locked in a room with the corpse, the story gets interesting.

=== Santa Claws ===
A boy called Sean visits a hypnotist on Christmas Day because he somehow gets a small mouth that is the size of a marble. The boy explains through writing that while taking his younger brother Christmas shopping, they encountered a Santa Claus that had claws for fingernails and gave them, as well as their older sister, two wishes. Was later adapted as an episode of Round The Twist.

=== A Dozen Bloomin' Roses ===
The story follows the narrator's encounter with a boy, Gerald, who purchases a bouquet of a dozen roses for a girl. After a series of embarrassing accidents including spending most of his grandmother's pension, destroying the flowers on the train and being publicly humiliated by a local skinhead called Scouse, Gerald runs down a train tunnel and is killed by an oncoming train. As the narrator struggles to cope with Gerald's death, 12 roses appear from their hand, a gift from Gerald from beyond the grave. Afterwards when the narrator has a violent altercation on a train with Scouse, the train suddenly becomes completely filled with roses which result in the death of the skinhead, saving the narrator's life. At the conclusion, it is revealed that the narrator, Samantha, was the girl Gerald had bought the flowers for. Was later adapted as a fanmade visual novel.

=== Tonsil Eye 'Tis ===
A boy who is obsessed with garden gnomes gets a gnome with a face in its mouth. After getting the face out of the gnome's mouth, the boy ends up getting the face in his own mouth, as well as an eye growing on his finger.

=== Unhappily Ever After ===
A principal called Mr. Brown who enjoys giving the strap to troublemakers, as well as people who insult him, goes for a boat ride, but when he gets trapped in a current, he is forced to watch images of people doing to others what those others do to them.

=== Spooks Incorporated ===
Two boys called Mick and Shifty enjoy pretending to be ghosts and haunting houses so that their owners will sell them. But when they create a mechanical headless chicken to scare off the owner of a local Melbourne pub, they find out that the pub really is haunted - by the real headless chicken.

=== The Copy ===
A boy called Tim who has a doctor for a friend visits the doctor every day to see his inventions. The doctor's latest invention is a machine that can copy people. The boy ends up copying himself so he can take down a bully, but his copy ends up stealing his tea, his girlfriend, and finally his life. Was later loosely adapted as an episode of Round The Twist.

=== Stuffed ===
A young man called Martin works by clearing cane toads from peoples' yards and releasing them in a swamp - despite the cane toad's status as an invasive species in Australia, he actually loves toads and ends up having two of them for pets. Frisbee, a man who lives near him sells souvenirs, but he ends up becoming a toad clearer himself. But he is different - he enjoys killing the toads and stuffing them for his new line of souvenirs. Will Martin be able to stop Frisbee from killing them?

=== No Is Yes ===
A man has kept his 14-year-old daughter Linda locked up in his house for her entire life; he is the only person with whom she has interacted, and he has deliberately communicated with her in 'mixed-up English', using words in opposite contexts (such as interchanging the words 'yes' and 'no') to demonstrate a point about the way a person learns to speak. A young plumber called Ralph visits and is horrified, and the father gives him permission to attempt to explain the experiment to Linda, convinced that she will not be able to comprehend what he is telling her; he tries several times, and as the story progresses she shows signs of beginning to understand what her father has done.

At the climax of the story, the house burns down with Linda's father trapped inside. When the fireman asks Linda if anyone is inside the house, she tells him 'no'; but, her meaning is left ambiguous.

This story was meant for young adults.
