= Australian Association for the Teaching of English =

The Australian Association for the Teaching of English (AATE) is the national arm of the state/territory associations for the teaching of English. All members of state and territory organisations pay an affiliation fee to AATE and are automatically members of the national association.

== Affiliated State and Territory Associations ==
State/Territory	Association Abbreviation	Association Name	Web
QLD	ETAQ	English Teachers Association of Queensland	
NSW	ETANSW	English Teachers Association of NSW	
ACT	ACTATE	ACT Association for the Teaching of English	
VIC	VATE	Victorian Association for the Teaching of English	
TAS	TATE	Tasmanian Association for the Teaching of English	
SA	SAETA	South Australian English Teachers Association	
WA	ETAWA	English Teachers Association of Western Australia	
NT	ETANT	English Teachers' Association of the Northern Territory	

== History of AATE ==
AATE was formed, on the initiative of Peter B. McDonald, past President of the South Australian English Teachers Association, at a meeting in September 1964. Representatives from New South Wales, the Australian Capital Territory, South Australia, Western Australia and Victoria attended this first meeting. Queensland and the Northern Territory joined the Association a few years later.

== Publications ==
- English in Australia (peer-reviewed, scholarly journal)
- AATE Interface Series (Wakefield Press)
- Golden Stories Anthology
- The Artful English Teacher (AATE)
