= Round the Twist =

Australian children's comedy television series

- Created by: Patricia Edgar; Esben Storm; Paul Jennings
- Developed by: Australian Children's Television Foundation
- Written by: Paul Jennings; Esben Storm; Ray Boseley; Chris Anastassiades; Louise Fox; Robert Greenberg; Christine Madafferi
- Directed by: Esben Storm; Steve Jodrell; Mark Lewis; Pino Amenta; Ray Boseley; David Swann; Arnie Custo
- Opening theme: Round The Twist lyrics and music by Andrew Duffield sung by Tamsin West
- Ending theme: Round The Twist lyrics and music by Andrew Duffield sung by Tamsin West
- Country of origin: Australia
- No. of series: 4
- No. of episodes: 52 (list of episodes)

Production
- Executive producer: Patricia Edgar
- Running time: 25 minutes
- Production company: Australian Children's Television Foundation

Original release
- Network: BBC One (1990); Seven Network (1990); ABC (1993–2001)
- Release: 6 April 1990 – 2 May 2001

Round the Twist is an Australian children's comedy drama television series originally broadcast by the Seven Network. The program follows the supernatural adventures of the Twist family, who leave their conventional residence to live in a lighthouse, in the fictional coastal town of Port Niranda.

The early episodes of the series were based on stories by author Paul Jennings who also co-wrote the series screenplay in collaboration with creator and executive producer Patricia Edgar and co-director Esben Storm.

The series was developed by the Australian Children's Television Foundation (ACTF), the media company created by Edgar.

== History ==
Patricia Edgar agreed to have Jennings write the series, on the condition he would be mentored by and collaborate with the director, actor, and writer Esben Storm.

Edgar previously worked with Storm on the children's show Winners and the TV film series Touch the Sun. The partnership between Edgar, Jennings and Storm was an efficient team for the development of the first series, whose characters and community were set around a lighthouse on a coastline. Jennings and Storm drew from the plots in Jennings's existing short stories and created new ideas, sometimes using two stories in an episode to fill out the plots.

Edgar's instructions, based on research done on Australian children's viewing preferences, was to balance the stories around a family with three leading child characters. The teenage twins Pete and Linda Twist, and their younger brother Bronson were given equal time throughout the episodes' stories. The rest of the cast were to be gender-balanced. Edgar stressed the importance of jokes and humour and told Storm to push the boundaries, while grounding the series firmly in the emotions and issues of growing children.

Round the Twist was first produced by Edgar for the Australian Children's Television Foundation (ACTF) in 1989. The four series of the program won 16 national and international awards, including the Prix Jeunesse, the Banff Rockie Award for Best Children's Program, the Grand Jury Prize, two Gold World Medals in the Youth Category at the New York Festivals, two Australian Film Institute awards for Most Outstanding Children's program, and five Australian Teachers of Media Awards.

The series was screened in over 70 countries by broadcasters such as Fox Kids (USA), BBC One (UK), Nickelodeon (UK), CBC Television (Canada), France 2 (France), ZDF (Germany), Network 2 (Ireland) and NHK (Japan).

In 1998, Round the Twist was chosen in the international trade magazine KidScreen's "Dream Block" poll – a "Dream Two-Hour Children's Block" – by the world's leading programmers and distributors of children's television. Other programs selected for the “Dream Block” included Rugrats and The Simpsons.

== Synopsis ==
Round the Twist is set around an old lighthouse in the fictional Port Niranda, on the rugged southwest Victorian coast and features the Twist family: fourteen-year-old twins Pete and Linda, eight-year-old son Bronson, and father Tony, a widowed artist who makes sculptures. Each episode finds the Twist kids involved in surreal, supernatural adventures.

The series has been categorised as humorous, contemporary fantasy.

There were four series of Round the Twist made during the show's 11-year run. The first 13 half-hour episodes were part of a three-program package the ACTF sold to the Seven Network in September 1988, which also included Kaboodle and The Greatest Tune on Earth. The first series of Round the Twist was based on the popular novels Unreal!, Quirky Tales, Unbelievable!, Cabbage Patch Fib, and Uncanny! by Jennings, who had three books on the Australian children's bestseller list at the time.

Jennings was the scriptwriter for the first and second series. Storm was the script editor of the first series, co-writer for the second series, and screenwriter and script editor for the third and fourth series. Ray Boseley and Chris Anastassiades were also the writers for the third series. Louise Fox, Christine Madafferi, and Robert Greenberg were assigned the fourth series. The second (1992), third (2000), and fourth series (2001) shared elements with the first regarding style, characterisations, themes, locations, and genres with the original series. The third and fourth series were not based on Jennings' books, but served as continuations of the first two series.

== Theme song ==
The lyrics and music of the theme song were written by Andrew Duffield and sung by Tamsin West, who played Linda Twist in the first series. It borrowed lines from nursery rhymes such as, "There Was an Old Lady Who Swallowed a Fly", "Humpty Dumpty" and "Rain Rain Go Away". In 2018, the song was used in a series of Halloween television adverts by UK supermarket chain Sainsbury's.

== Casting ==
Making a show about children over the course of more than a decade necessitated a number of cast changes, as the child actors became too old for their parts. Three sets of children, the Twists, the Gribbles, and Fiona were cast. All of the major adult roles were recast at least once.

Character	Series 1 (1990)	Series 2 (1993)	Series 3 (2000)	Series 4 (2001)
Tony "Dad" Twist	Richard Moir	Richard Moir	Andrew Gilbert	Andrew Gilbert
Pete Twist	Sam Vandenberg	Ben Thomas	Rian McLean	Rian McLean
Linda Twist	Tamsin West	Joelene Crnogorac	Ebonnie Masini	Ebonnie Masini
Bronson Twist	Rodney McLennan	Jeffrey Walker	Mathew Waters	Mathew Waters
Fay James	Robyn Gibbes	Robyn Gibbes	Trudy Hellier	Susanne Chapman
Helen "Nell" Richards	Bunney Brooke (Note: Except Series 1 episode The Gum Leaf War, Bunney Brooke appears as character "Aunt Tuneless".)	Bunney Brooke	Marion Heathfield	Marion Heathfield
Mr. Harold Gribble	Frankie J. Holden	Mark Mitchell	Mark Mitchell	Mark Mitchell
Matron Gribble	Judith McGrath	Jan Friedl	Christine Keogh	Christine Keogh
James "Gribbs" Gribble	Lachlan Jeffrey (Note: Except Series 1 episode The Gum Leaf War, in which Lachlan Jeffrey appears only as Foxy Jr.)	Richard Young (Note: Richard Young later appeared in the Series 4 episode, Face the Fear where he plays one of the policemen.)	Brook Sykes (Note: Credited as Brook Rowan in Series 3.)	Brook Sykes
Tiger Gleeson	Cameron Nugent	Nick Mitchell	Tom Budge	Tom Budge
Rabbit	Stuart Atkin	Drew Campbell	Samuel Marsland	Samuel Marsland
Fiona Richmond	Daisy Cameron	Zeta Briggs	Katie Barnes	Katie Barnes
Mr. Ralph Snapper	Esben Storm	Esben Storm	Esben Storm	Ernie Gray

Around sixty child actors from all over Victoria were divided into small groups and given the scripts to the workshop under Esben Storm's direction.

== Characters ==
The show revolves around the Twist family:

- Tony Twist ("Dad") is a widower with a kind heart who maintains a romantic interest in Bronson's schoolteacher, Ms. James, and regularly embarrasses the Twist children.
- Pete Twist is Linda's 14-year-old twin brother who occasionally goes out with his classmate Fiona. Along with Linda, he enjoys teasing his younger brother Bronson. Pete finds himself in embarrassing situations, and is often under siege from Gribble Junior and his gang.
- Linda Twist is Pete's 14-year-old twin sister, whose interests include feminism, environmentalism, and judo. She enjoys picking on her younger brother. She takes life quite seriously and tries to bring a sense of normality to her family who sometimes go out of control. Linda has a strong sense of justice, knows what is fair, and is prepared to go out of her way to achieve it. She is the most mature and spiritual of the Twist kids.
- Bronson Twist is the twins' 8-year-old younger brother. He is obsessed with food and odors and uses comedic malapropisms, such as confusing widower with windower. As the youngest of the family, he often feels left out of what his older siblings are doing, and tags along their adventures despite the possibility of danger or ridicule. On a few occasions, he is treated as older than his age, such as in Series 1, where he is expected to take full responsibility for a green baby he found in the cabbage patch.

=== Other ===
- Helen "Nell" Rickards (Series 2 as Nell Sands) – the old woman who lives in a cottage next door, whose brother, Tom, had been the former lighthouse keeper. Her father, mother, and sister died when the ship they were on sank. The family's spirits, as well as Tom's, haunted the lighthouse.
- Harold Gribble – a greedy real-estate agent and one-time Senate candidate, who often tries to force the Twists to move out of the lighthouse.
- "Matron" Cecilia Gribble – Harold's supportive wife who is a nurse. She is just as scheming as her husband.
- James Gribble – Harold's no-good son. He is a bully at school who often antagonizes Pete.
- "Rabbit" – one of James Gribble's friends.
- "Tiger" Gleeson – one of James Gribble's friends.
- Fay James – Bronson's schoolteacher; Fay James is a love interest for Tony, and lives with the Twists in Series 3 and 4.
- Ralph Snapper – Pete and Linda's teacher. He is a harsh disciplinarian who does not respond well to children's insolence, but is socially awkward around adults.
- Fiona Richmond – Linda's friend, and Pete's sometime girlfriend.
- Hugh Townsend – Linda's love crush in Series 1.
- Anthony – A well-meaning nerd with a crush on Linda in Series 3 and 4.
- Padre, Sacha, and Emily – Three girls Pete tries to win over in Series 4.

Characters who appear briefly in each episode of a series include:

- Ghosts of Nell Rickard's family members – her parents Stanley & Louise Rickards, her siblings Tom and sister Sarah Rickards.
- Ghost Matthew and Ghost Jeremiah – ghosts of two men whose spirits were trapped in the lighthouse during Series 2 after they failed to guide a boat to shore one hundred years earlier.
- Ariel – a girl from the "Isle of Dreams" who wants to take Pete away in Series 4.
- Mr. Nic Papadelioises – a local small deli owner who gave Bronson his first job.

== Storylines ==
Round the Twist pushed the boundaries of acceptability for children's television, often to the point when the show was nearly canceled for it, as seen with the series three premiere, "The Big Burp".

Four series of Round the Twist were made, each with thirteen episodes. Each episode has a self-contained plot. Each series has a recurring theme, usually an object or character which appears briefly in every episode, and develops until the final episode of each series, in which it is explained and resolved.

The Twist family has frequent conflicts with a ruthless local businessman, Harold Gribble, and his family. Gribble seeks to remove the Twists from the lighthouse in order to turn it into a tourist attraction. This is a continuing feature of the first series and a recurring feature of the third and fourth series.

=== Series 1 (1990) ===
The first series had the following episodes:

- "Skeleton on the Dunny"
- "Birdsdo"
- "A Good Tip for Ghosts"
- "The Cabbage Patch Fib"
- "Spaghetti Pig Out"
- "The Gum Leaf War"
- "Santa Claws"
- "Wunderpants"
- "Lucky Lips"
- "Know All"
- "The Copy"
- "Without My Pants"
- "Lighthouse Blues"

The lighthouse is haunted by eerie music coming from upstairs. In the final episode, "Lighthouse Blues", the music is revealed to be played by the ghosts of Nell's deceased family. The ghosts help the Twists prevent one of Gribble's business associates from destroying the lighthouse.

In a subplot, Tony falls in love with Fay and spends the series developing a relationship with her, culminating in a marriage proposal at the finale. The answer to the proposal is left open-ended.

The series retains the humorous and suspenseful elements and surprise endings of the books.

=== Series 2 (1992) ===
The second series reintroduces the Twist family and the local identities from the coastal town of Port Niranda. The thirteen stories in the second series were completely new tales. They shared elements in style, characterisation, theme, location, and genre with the first series but each storyline was unpredictable and fresh.

The second series has the following episodes:

- "Next Time Around"
- "Copy Cat"
- "Little Squirt"
- "Pink Bow Tie"
- "Nails"
- "Sloppy Jalopy"
- "Smelly Feet"
- "Grandad's Gift"
- "Ice Maiden"
- "Yuckles"
- "Quivering Heap"
- "Little Black Balls"
- "Seeing The Light"

Richard Moir reprises his role as Tony, but his children have been recast.

The lighthouse is haunted again by two ghosts who reveal themselves as Matthew and Jeremiah, who are being punished because, 100 years ago, they failed as lighthouse keepers to stop a ship carrying Matthew's love, Jane, from being wrecked on the rocks. In the final episode, "Seeing the Light", the ghost ship comes again, and this time, all of the characters from the show help turn on the lighthouse light and save the family who was lost at sea and redeem the ghosts.

Tony and Fay become officially engaged, but Fay becomes concerned that Bronson does not want her to marry Tony, which leads to the engagement being broken off. They are re-engaged at the end of the series.

In this series, Mr. Gribble is not concerned with removing the Twists from the lighthouse; rather, he campaigns for a Senate seat with the fictional Progressive Conservative Party. Disagreeing with his policies, Nell runs against him in a party similar to the Australian Greens and ultimately wins in a landslide.

=== Series 3 (2000) ===
The demand for more Round The Twist worldwide led Edgar to proceed with Series 3 and 4, which were made back-to-back with the same child cast. Storm led the workshops to create scripts for the third and fourth series, which have the following episodes:

- "The Big Burp"
- "Viking Book of Love"
- "Whirling Derfish"
- "UMI"
- "Truth Hits Everybody"
- "The Nirandathal Beast"
- "Mail-Boo"
- "Brainless"
- "Toy Love"
- "Tears of Innocence"
- "The Ice Cream Man Cometh"
- "If the Walls Could Talk"
- "The Big Rock"

The third series recast most of the characters. In this series, Mr. Gribble plans to turn Port Niranda into the honeymoon capital of the world by tearing down the lighthouse and building a casino in its place. Fay has moved in with Tony and the kids for a trial period to see if they can live in harmony with each other.

=== Series 4 (2001) ===
The fourth series has the following episodes:

- "Welcome Back"
- "Monster Under the Bed"
- "Linda Godiva"
- "Dog by Night"
- "TV or Not TV"
- "Face the Fear"
- "Hair Brain"
- "Princess and the Pete"
- "Bird Boy"
- "The Shadow Player"
- "Radio Da Da"
- "Skunkman"
- "The Isle of Dreams"

In each episode, a knight in armour enters the lighthouse through a magical door. At the beginning of the series, the knight's face is hidden behind a visor; in the second half, the visor is raised. In the final episode, "The Isle of Dreams", the stranger is revealed to be a girl, Ariel, who offers the children a perfect life on the Isle of Dreams if Pete will become her husband. In the end, they decline, and Ariel disappears forever, along with the enchanted isle.

A subplot in this series is Fay's pregnancy with Tony's baby, named Ariel, who is born in the series finale.

== Production ==
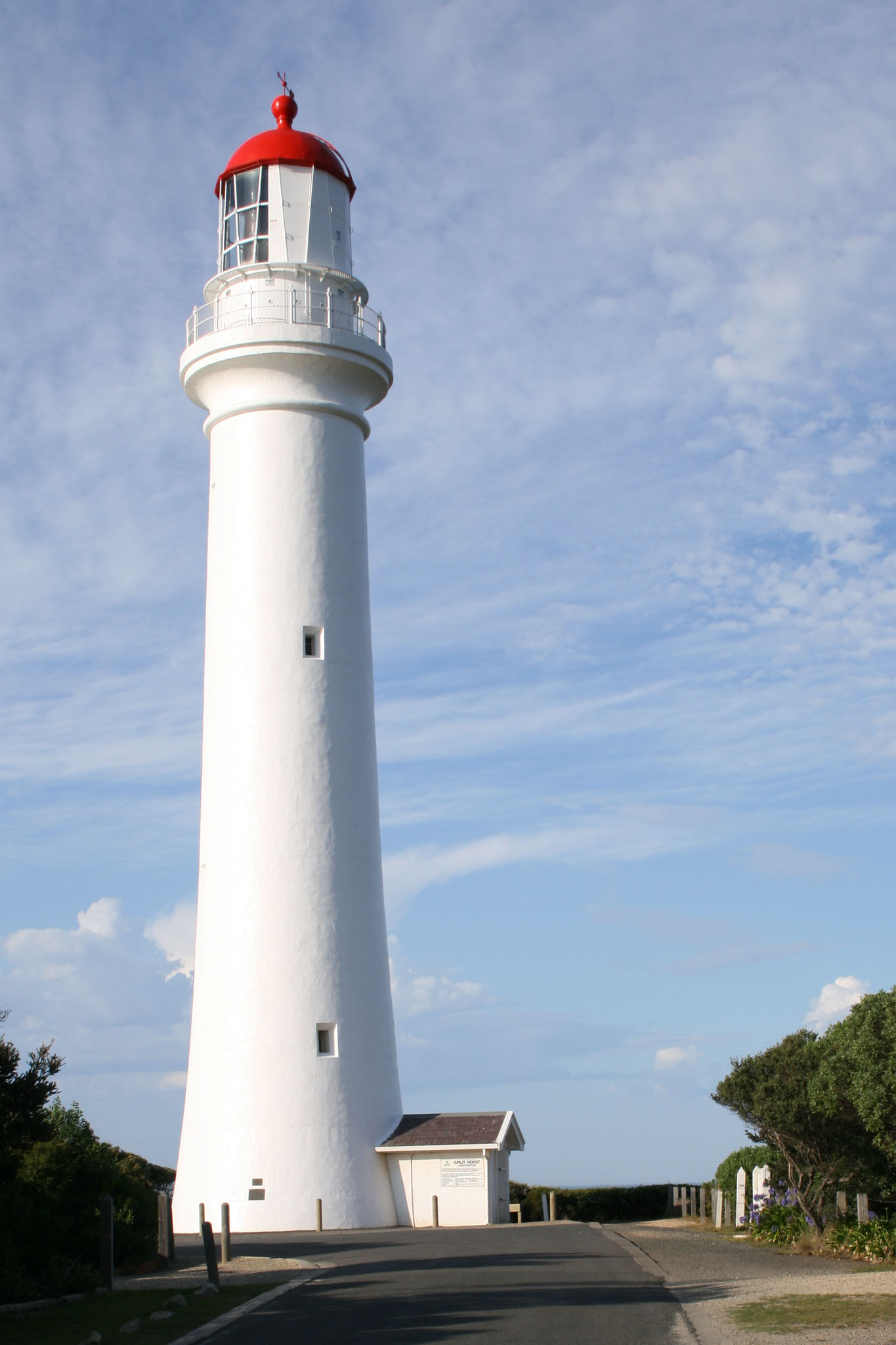
The Split Point Lighthouse was used for the exterior scenes of the Twist family's lighthouse home.

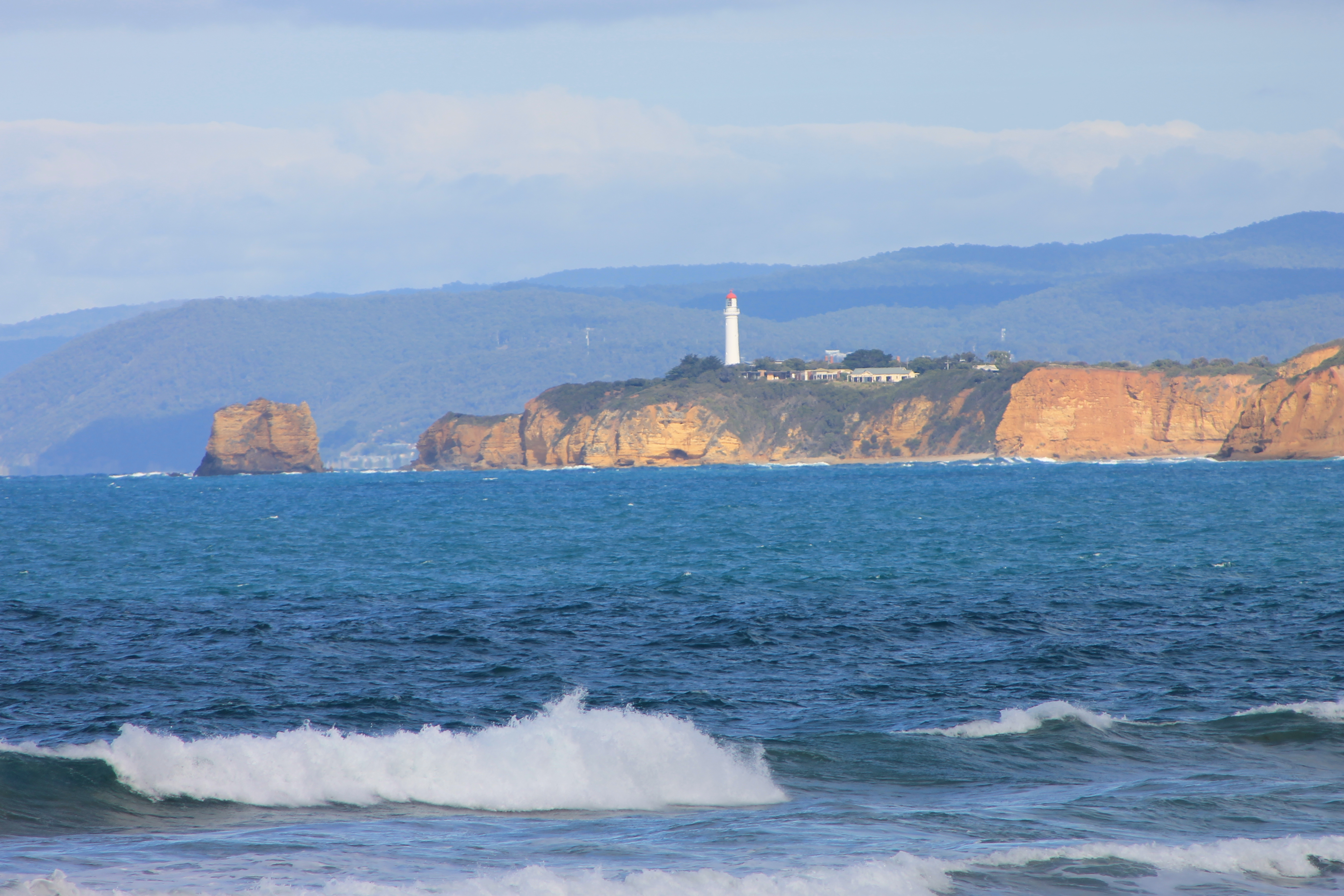
Aireys Inlet with the lighthouse in background

=== Series 1 ===
The first series of Round The Twist went into pre-production in March 1989 and production began on 4 April and ran for 13 weeks. Filming took place at Melbourne Film Studios and the lighthouse on the Victorian coast.

Throughout the series, several locations in Victoria, Australia, were used for external shots. Exterior scenes of the Twist family's lighthouse home were shot at the Split Point Lighthouse in Aireys Inlet. The school and some town scenes were shot in Williamstown, Point Lonsdale, and Queenscliff.

The seventh episode of series one was supposed to be "Frozen Stiff", but that had to be changed as it was too expensive to freeze a house and thirty animals inside large ice blocks.

Nell was supposed to die in "Lighthouse Blues", but Storm told Jennings, "it's too depressing after thirteen weeks. We can't finish the series by killing off a well-loved character."

The first two series were written by Jennings and edited by Storm. Jennings made cameo appearances, including as the ghost of Ben Byron in "Without My Pants".

=== Series 2 ===
Following the success of Round the Twist both in Australia and in overseas markets, the ACTF developed a second 13-episode series. The second series was in pre-production in April 1992. Filming took place from 23 March to 19 June 1992 and finished on 23 June 1992.

Edgar continued as executive director, and Jennings and Storm wrote the scripts. Storm was the main series director, Steve Jodrell also directed episodes in the second series, and Antonia Barnard was the co-producer of the second series. Adult cast members remained the same as in the first series, except for Mr. Gribble and Matron Gribble, who were recast with Mark Mitchell and Jan Friedl.

Auditions were held in 1991 to find new child actors to replace characters like Pete, Linda, and Bronson. The second series was in post-production until 30 November 1992. It was pre-purchased by the Australian Broadcasting Corporation, the British Broadcasting Corporation, Ravensburger Film, and TV Gmbh (for German-speaking territories), and Tri Star Gmbh (for Italy).

=== Series 3 ===
The third and fourth series were written by various writers and re-used the same characters, but they did not draw from Jennings' material. Two years before the third series was aired, Jennings' stories were being adapted into a different show called Driven Crazy, which failed to match the popularity of the early Round the Twist and of which only one series was produced.

The ACTF started development of a new series of Round The Twist in 1997. It was produced by Edgar with Bernadette O'Mahony and written by Storm, Chris Anastassiades, and Ray Boseley. The series was directed by Boseley, Storm, and Pino Amenta. The series was pre-sold to the ABC, BBC, Nickelodeon UK, and Disney European channels, and financed by the Australian Film Finance Corporation.

The scripts were completed by November 1997. In November 1998, pre-production of the series began. An Australia-wide search for the child leads was conducted, and more than 800 children auditioned for the roles of Linda, Pete, Bronson, and the Gribble gang, Rabbit, Tiger, and Gribbs. In early 1999, filming took place on location at Aireys Inlet and Crawford Productions' studio in Melbourne. In November 1999, the series was completed and distributed to broadcasters.

=== Series 4 ===
Storylines for the fourth series were being written in 1998 following a creative workshop directed by Storm in early September at the ACTF's offices. In 2000, the ACTF completed the development of the fourth series of Round the Twist, which was written by Storm, Boseley, Louise Fox, Christine Madafferi, and Robert Greenberg. In November 1999, pre-production of the fourth series began, with principal photography starting in February 2000 and ending in May 2000.

Edgar was executive producer and producer. The line producer was Helen Watts, with directors David Swann, Arnie Custo, and Boseley. Filming for the series started on 7 February 2000, and continued for three months in and around Melbourne, in the Crawford Productions' studio, Williamstown Primary School, and Airey's Inlet. Most of the main cast from Season 3 returned for Season 4.

=== Feature film ===
A full-length Round the Twist feature film was developed and written by Storm and Boseley. In October 1994, a storyline workshop for the feature film was held under Storm's guidance. Production was planned for 1997–98, but funding for the project was not granted. Edgar explains in her book Bloodbath that feature films based on television are rarely financed by distributors, must compete with big-budget films, and are typically launched during the school holidays, among many other complicating factors. Despite Edgar's best efforts to have the Round the Twist feature film come to fruition, the project was scrapped.

== Reception ==
In the United Kingdom, Round the Twist aired on BBC One during the channel's Children's BBC strand several times in the 1990s and early 2000s. It was rerun in 2007 on Channel 5 on Sunday mornings. It also regularly appeared on Network 2 in Ireland, and was popular in Germany and the Netherlands.

It was shown in Sri Lanka by the Sri Lanka Rupavahini Corporation with Sinhalese subtitles under the name "ට්විස්ට් පවුලේ අපූරු චාරිකා" (ṭvisṭ pavulē apūru chārikā), lit. 'The Amazing Adventures of the Family Twist'. In Canada, it won the Banff Television Festival award for "Best Children's Program" in 2000. In Australia, it won the Logie Award for "Outstanding Children's Program" in 2001 (tied with Hi-5) and 2002. It was nominated for an award at the Australian Film Institute.

=== Series 1 ===
In 1995, TV 4 Sweden advised that the Round the Twist series won its time slot in the afternoons with a 25 percent audience share. TV 2 Denmark also screened the series in 1995 and reported excellent ratings. In Denmark, Round the Twist is called “The Children Of The Lighthouse”. In Germany, it is called “Twist Totale”. The Finnish Broadcasting Company and Wharf Cable in Hong Kong acquired Round the Twist in March 1995. AVRO, a Dutch public channel, acquired the second series in June 1995.

The ACTF received letters and phone calls from viewers of Les Twist Famille in France, many of whom had watched the program on Canal J, the French children's channel. In Canada, CBC Television started screening the program in May 1995. The French-language version was broadcast on sister channel Télévision de Radio-Canada later that year. The CBC reported that a significant number of university students had been among the correspondents writing to them to express their appreciation of the series.

=== Series 2 ===
The second series was pre-sold to the BBC and Ravensburger in Germany, and received an upfront distribution advance from DARO for Spain, Portugal, Albania, Bulgaria, Hungary, Poland, Rumania, USSR, Africa (excluding South Africa), Ireland, Greece, Belgium, Brazil, New Zealand, Czechoslovakia, Yugoslavia, Turkey, Iceland, and South Korea.

In 1995, Series 1 of Round the Twist screened in Sweden for the first time by TV4. It was so popular that TV4 contacted the ACTF to acquire the second series so that it be immediately aired.

The second series of Round the Twist aired on TV 2 in Denmark in January 1995, and was shown on Canal J in France. The ACTF received letters and telephone calls from young viewers in France who loved the series.

In 1997, Round the Twist was named "Kids’ Vid of the Week" and given four stars by The Age Green Guide.

The acquisition of Round the Twist by FOX Network coincided with the repeat of series one on BBC1 in the UK. The series reached number two in the Top 10 Children's Programs.

There were 6,109 hits on the Round the Twist website from Finland during the second week in July 1997, which reflected local viewer interest.

Round The Twist series 1 and 2 sold and resold in 54 countries including the US.

==== Launch ====
To launch the program, the ACTF and the Australian Broadcasting Corporation (ABC) transformed one of the ABC's Elsternwick studios into a Round the Twist set. Four Foundation staff members attended the MIPCOM market in Cannes, France, in October 1992 to launch the second series of Round the Twist and Lift Off on the international market.

The second series of Round the Twist was a major success when it was screened on BBC1 in the United Kingdom in early 1993. It was rated the first most popular children's program in the United Kingdom by the time it had finished airing. BBC Enterprises entered into a contract with the ACTF for the release of Round the Twist in the United Kingdom. Series 2 was also sold to Germany, Austria, Italy, France, Portugal, Ireland, Greece, Zimbabwe, and Thailand in 1993.

==== Family Album on ABC ====
In 1994, the ABC presented a family viewing hour, Family Album, from 6.00 pm to 7.00 pm on Saturday, from 26 February 1994 to January 1995. The slot was conceived by Edgar in recognition of 1994 being the International Year of the Family.

The Foundation produced a study guide to accompany the Family Album series, which included information on individual programs and activities for students to supplement Round the Twist, and was sent out to all schools in Australia.

==== ACTF Programs in Children's Hospitals ====
The ACTF donated 210 videos to the Starlight Fun Centre Trolley program operating in pediatric wards in hospitals around Australia; Round the Twist and Lift Off were particularly requested.

=== Series 3 ===
Round the Twist rated number one on the BBC in the middle of 1998. The BBC screened the third series at 4:30 pm on Monday afternoons from 10 January – 10 April 2000. Figures supplied by the BBC Broadcast Strategy Channel Development group indicated that the BBC audience viewership in the 4:30 pm slot increased by 13–18% share over the period when the program aired. The BBC's average audience in those weeks was approximately two million people or 37% of the audience watching television at that time.

In Finland, the series aired daily during the summer holidays in June 2000. Yle described the screening as a "great success" with an average rating of 8.0. The audience share achieved was never less than 55% and it peaked at 75% in the 10- to 14-year-old age group.

Series 3 was a critical and popular success. In the 5.00 pm time slot, season 3 was consistently watched by 323,300 people, including:

- An average of 61% of children between the ages of 5–12 years old (compared to averages of between 9-19% on the other networks at this time)
- Over 31% of children in the 13-17 year age group

=== Series 4 ===
==== The Queen's visit ====
The Foundation hosted Queen Elizabeth II during her Australian tour in March. She visited the Melbourne set of the fourth series on 23 March 2000, where she was greeted by Edgar, Janet Holmes à Court, and Dame Margaret Guilfoyle.

The Queen included Round the Twist as part of her itinerary in recognition of the ACTF's achievements on behalf of young people since its inception in 1982. Round The Twist was the most commercially successful and popular Australian children's drama series ever made. The third series (which was screened on the ABC and BBC when the Queen visited the set) attracted 2.1 million viewers in the UK in 2000 and was the highest-rated program for 5–12-year-olds in the 5:00 pm timeslot in Australia.

==== Studio City ====
Studio City at Melbourne Docklands opened in 2002. The ACTF signed a contract for a major children's attraction at the proposed Paramount-branded theme park, and the attraction included the characters and adventures of the popular series, and featured a tree spirit, a Viking shipwreck, and a hall of distortion that culminated in a slide from the series’ lighthouse icon.

Edgar said the attraction would enable local families and overseas visitors to interact with the characters and storylines from Round The Twist.

We have been in discussion with Studio City for some time. Our interest is to provide a unique, thoroughly Australian experience. Round The Twist provides the right ingredients. It's scary, outrageous, quirky, surprising, with a big 'yuk' factor and lots of laughs. Strange things will happen in the Round The Twist attraction at Studio City.

— Patricia Edgar

Studio City, backed by Viacom, comprises a theme park, film and television studios, and a recreational precinct.

==== Melbourne International Festival and Museum ====
The cast members from Round the Twist were at the Big Box Family Children's Festival. Two episodes from the fourth series, filmed earlier in the year, were screened at the new Melbourne Museum's theatre. Many fans met their favourite characters from Round the Twist at the Festival on 29 October 2000; the Festival was jointly hosted by the Melbourne Festival and the Melbourne Museum.

The cast were the emcees for the day, and they introduced national and international performers including Ethiopian Circus and Wild Moves.

== Awards and nominations ==
Round The Twist Series 1
Year	Nominated work	Award event	Category	Result	Reference
1990	Wunderpants	Australian teachers of Media (ATOM), Melbourne	Children's Narrative Award	Highly Commended	
1990	Cinematographer of Cabbage Patch Fib: Jan Kenny	Australian Cinematographers Society (ACS), New South Wales	Cinematographer	Merit	
1990	Round The twist	AWGIE Awards	Children's (TV) Award	Winner	
1991	Without My Pants	ATOM	Children's Award - Narrative Section	Winner	
1991	Lucky Lips	ATOM	Children's Award - Narrative Section	Winner	
1991	Lucky Lips	ATOM	General Award - Narrative Section	Winner	
1991	Cabbage Patch Fib	Banff Television Festival, Canada	Children's Program	Selected for screening	
1991	Spaghetti Pig Out	Banff Television Festival, Canada	Children's Program	Selected for screening	
1991	Cabbage Patch Fib	AFI Awards, Melbourne	Best Children's Television Drama	Nominated	
1991	Wunderpants	AFI Awards, Melbourne	Best Children's Television Drama	Winner	

Round The Twist Series 2

Year	Nominated work	Award event	Category	Result	Reference
1993	Little Squirt	AFI Awards, Melbourne	Best Children's Television Drama	Winner	
1993	Writers of Nails: Paul Jennings and Esben Storm	AWGIE Awards	Children's Adaptation (TV)	Winner	
1993	Writers of Copy Cat: Paul Jennings and Esben Storm	AWGIE Awards	Children's Adaptation (TV)	Nominated	
1993	Round The twist 2	International Emmy Awards, New York	Children's and Young People Section	Finalist	
1994	Little Squirt	ATOM	Primary Student Judging Panel Award	Winner	
1994	Little Black Balls	ATOM	Children's (TV) Award	Winner	
1994	Little Squirt	Prix Jeunesse, Munich	Age 7-12 Fiction Category	Winner	
1996	Round The twist 2	Cairo International Film Festival for Children, Egypt	Australian Children's Panorama	Screened	

Round The Twist Series 3

Year	Nominated work	Award event	Category	Result	Reference
2000	Whirling Derfish	Banff Rockie Awards, Canada	Children's program	Finalist	
2000	Episodes 3, 6, 9 and 10	ATOM, Melbourne	Best Children's Television Series	Nominated	
2000	The Nirandathal Beast	Museum of Television & Radio, New York and California	Ninth International Children's Television Festival	Selected for screening	
2000	Writer & Director of Whirling Derfish: Ray Boseley	Banff Rockie Awards, Canada	Children's Program	Winner	
2000	Whirling Derfish	BAFTA Awards, London	Entry into judging	Accepted	
2000	Tears of Innocence	The Film Council of Greater Columbus (aka The Chris Awards)	Media of Print	Honourable Mention	
2000	Whirling Derfish	The Film Council of Greater Columbus (aka The Chris Awards)	Media of Print	Honourable Mention	
2000	Whirling Derfish	The Film Council of Greater Columbus (aka The Chris Awards)	Media of Print	Certificate of Recognition	

Round The Twist Series 4

Year	Nominated work	Award event	Category	Result	Reference
2001	The Princess and Pete	AWGIE Awards	Children's Screen and Radio	Nominated	
2001	Skunkman	AWGIE Awards	Children's Screen and Radio	Winner	
2001	Welcome Back	BAFTA Awards, London	Membership vote	Qualified in top four	
2002	Round The twist 4	TV Week Logie Awards, Melbourne	Logie Award - Most Outstanding Children's Program on Australian Television for 2001	Winner (Note: Round the Twist was tied with Hi-5.)	
2002	Round The twist 4	ATOM, Melbourne	Best Children's TV Series	Finalist	

== Marketing and publishing ==
A tie-in book written by Jennings was published by Puffin Books in June 1990. Out of an initial print run of 22,000 copies, 16,000 were sent to the retail and education market. The book was released to tie in with the screening of the series on the Australian Television Network from 26 August 1990.

=== Series 1 ===
In 1989, the television rights for the thirteen 25-minute drama series were pre-sold to the Australian Television Network.

The series was promoted at MIP-TV in April 1989 and sales were achieved during MIPCOM in October 1989.

As part of a package distribution arrangement, Round the Twist was sold to Spain, Portugal, Albania, Bulgaria, Czechoslovakia, Hungary, Poland, Romania, USSR, Yugoslavia, Africa, Ireland, Greece, and Belgium.

The ACTF sold the program on videotape and reported 3,602 copies sold on 30 June 1991.

The ACTF distributed the Round the Twist 1 videotapes and to 30 June 1993 had sold more than 5,800 units.

By 30 June 1994 7,207 copies of Series 1 videotapes had been sold to schools. Compilation videotapes of the series were sold in department stores by CEL.

=== Series 2 ===
In 1992, Round the Twist was sold in Italy, Israel, Ireland, and Thailand. The ACTF had also sold more than 5,000 copies of the series by the end of the 1992 financial year.

Penguin Books Australia released the first Round the Twist graphic novels to coincide with the series premiere. The first volume featured the stories "Pink Bow Tie" and "Nails".

The ACTF sold the French-language versions of Series 1 and 2 to TFO in Canada; the French dub of the second series was also sold to France 2 and Canal J in France. The Knowledge Network in Canada acquired both series of Round The Twist in English.

CEL Home Video released Round The Twist 2 compilation videos on 25 December 1993. It continued to sell Round the Twist videos in 1996.

Series 1 and 2 were sold to the NHK in Japan. The ACTF received a large quantity of fan mail from Japanese children who enjoyed the series.

The BBC re-licensed terrestrial rights in both series of Round The Twist, while cable and satellite rights in both series were acquired by Nickelodeon UK.

In 1996, the Foundation finalised the sale of Round the Twist to the FOX Kids Network in the United States.

Series 1 and 2 were acquired by broadcasters in Ghana, Hungary, the Cook Islands, and Spain. Both series were re-licensed by the BBC in the UK. The first series went to air on BBC 1 in April and May 1997, where it was named the second most popular children's program in the ratings published by Broadcast magazine during that period. Alliance Canada acquired the Canadian video rights for both series, while Tring Plc in the UK acquired the rights for the first.

The ACTF also entered into a distribution agreement with Southern Star Sales for the distribution of Series 1 and 2 into South America.

Series 1 & 2 were acquired by Pakistan Television Corporation, FETV in Panama, United Family Communications (for pay television across Latin America), and the Zimbabwe Broadcasting Corporation.

=== Series 3 ===
Pre-sale commitments to the third series were acquired from the ABC, the BBC, Walt Disney Television International (for European Disney Channels excluding the UK), and Nickelodeon UK. The ACTF successfully applied to the Australian Film Finance Corporation Pty Limited (FFC) for investment in the series.

=== Series 4 ===
Series 4 was delivered to the ABC in December 2000 and pre-sold to the BBC, Buena Vista International (for its Disney Channels in France, Germany, Italy, and Spain), and Nickelodeon UK.

In 2001, the fourth series was released and immediately sold to Yle and TV 2. Cyprus Broadcasting Corporation and The Disney Channel Australia acquired both Series 3 and 4.

In 2003, ABC Enterprises later released a compilation CD featuring the Round the Twist theme, along with other themes of shows produced by the ACTF (The Genie From Down Under and Li'l Elvis Jones and the Truckstoppers). Series 4 was sold on DVD through distributor Magna Home Entertainment.

== Website ==
The Foundation built a dedicated Round the Twist website which went online in February 2000 to coincide with the ABC's first screening of the third series. The site has a Meet The Cast section, a Where Are They Now section (for cast members from earlier series), information about where the program was screening around the world, and information about the availability of books and videos of the series. Visitors to the site could e-mail the Foundation with their comments and questions about the series. New information was added to the site throughout 2000 to include a “behind the scenes” material from the fourth series. The ACTF established links to the site from various broadcasters that screened the series, such as the ABC and BBC.

The website was redesigned with the transmission of the fourth season on ABC and BBC.

== Home releases ==
In Australia, the series was released on DVD through Magna Home Entertainment in 2000–01 as seven volumes Magna Pacific DVD07500–DVD07506:

- Volume 1: Series 1 (1989) 9 episodes (2 discs), 216 mins
- Volume 2: Series 1 & 2 (1989, 1992) 9 episodes (2 discs), 216 mins
- Volume 3: Series 2 (1992) 8 episodes (2 discs), 192 mins
- Volume 4: Series 3 (1999) 6 episodes, 146 mins
- Volume 5: Series 3 (1999) 7 episodes (2 discs), 168 mins
- Volume 6: Series 4 (2001) 6 episodes, 146 mins
- Volume 7 (mislabeled as Volume 2): Series 4 (2001) 6 episodes 144 minutes

In the UK, Round The Twist was released on DVD. the first three DVDs were given a U rating and the fourth was given a PG rating.

In 2005, the seven volumes were sold as a boxed set of the entire series before being repacked and reissued in 2009.

On 2 February 2010, Magna re-released the whole series as a new packaged box set named the "Completely Twisted Collection".

On 19 April 2023, the Australian entertainment company Via Vision released the entire series in an eight-disc DVD package, entitled Round the Twist: The Complete Series (Remastered).

== Stage adaptation ==
A stage musical based on the television series was developed, with book, music and lyrics by Paul Hodge incorporating the original theme song. It premiered in Brisbane at the Playhouse, Queensland Performing Arts Centre in November 2024, directed by Simon Phillips for Queensland Theatre.

== See also ==
- List of Australian television series
