= Driven Crazy =

- Created by: Paul Jennings
- Developed by: Barron Television
- Country of origin: Australia
- No. of episodes: 13

Production
- Executive producers: Paul Barron; Joan Peters
- Running time: 25 minutes

Original release
- Network: Network Ten
- Release: 4 September – 27 November 1998

Driven Crazy is an Australian children's television series, based on the short stories by author Paul Jennings. It first aired in 1998 on Network Ten, and was the second television series based on his works.

== Plot ==
Driven Crazy follows the adventures of the Bourke family, who decide to drive across the continent. There, not only their old Chevy causes trouble.

== Cast ==
Actor	Character
Anthony Hammer	Ned Bourke
Molly McCaffrey	Danni Bourke
Fred Whitlock	Mr. Bourke
Alison Whyte	Mrs. Bourke
Michael Barallon	Crunch
Thomas Blackburne	Rolly
Reuben Liversidge	Ralph
Shannon Nunn	Charlie Burke
Steven Redmond	Possum
Ebonnie Masini	Sabine
Rhys Muldoon	McAvity
John Bluthal	Great Grandpa
Simon Palomares	Pierre
Michael Veitch	Mr. Bellows
Louise Siversen	Daisy
Rhona Rees	Silk
Katie Campbell	Kez
Fiona Corke	Rhonda
Chris Bidlo	Cinema Patron
Valentina Levkowicz	Mrs McGillicuddy
Alan Hopgood	Mr Tuck
Drew Forsythe	Sidney Drayton Mousechap
Frank Gallacher	Morris
Nicholas Bell	Principal
Michael Veitch	Mr Bellows
Brett Swain	Fred
Julia Blake	Miss Baker
Mike Bishop	Tom

== Production ==
All thirteen episodes were based on short stories from Paul Jennings' books, including Undone! and Uncovered!, both of which were released after the first two series of Round The Twist, which were similarly based on Jennings' short stories. After writing the scripts for the first two seasons of Round The Twist, Jennings left, after which new writers took over. The debut broadcast of first and only season of Driven Crazy occurred just two years before that of the third season of Round The Twist (in which – along with the subsequent fourth series – Jennings had no input).

== Episode list ==
=== Season 1 (1998) ===
#	Original Air Date	Episode	Notes
1	4 September 1998	Wobby Gurgle	Based on "You Be the Judge"
2	11 September 1998	The Moonies	
3	18 September 1998	The Cat	Based on "Singenpoo Strikes Again"
4	25 September 1998	One Shot Toothpaste	
5	2 October 1998	Noseweed	One scene is based on "Cow Dung Custard"
6	9 October 1998	Listen Ear	
7	16 October 1998	Lame Excuses	
8	23 October 1998	Liquid Zombies	Based on "Sneeze'n Coffin"
9	30 October 1998	Love Bug	Based on "Clear as Mud"
10	6 November 1998	Barely There	Based on "On the Bottom"
11	13 November 1998	Wake Up To Yourself	
12	20 November 1998	Mousechap	
13	27 November 1998	Too Many Rabbits	
