= Tongue tied (disambiguation) =

Tongue tied refers to ankyloglossia, a medical condition in which the lingual frenulum is unusually short, causing restricted movement of the tongue.

Tongue-tie, tongue tied or tongue-tied can also refer to:

== Literature ==
- Tongue-Tied (short story collection), a 2002 collection of short stories by Paul Jennings
  - "Tongue-Tied" a short story included in the collection
- Tongue-Tied: How a Tiny String Under the Tongue Impacts Nursing, Speech, Feeding, and More, a 2018 non-fiction book by Dr. Richard Baxter
- Tongue-Tied, a 1997 novel by Liselotte Marshall

== Music ==
- "Tongue Tied" (Red Dwarf song), 1988
- "Tongue Tied" (Boom Crash Opera song), 1995
- "Tongue Tied" (Faber Drive song), 2007
- "Tongue Tied" (Grouplove song), 2011
- "Tongue Tied" (Marshmello, Yungblud and Blackbear song), 2019
- "Tongue Tied" (AleXa song), 2026
- "Tongue Tied", a song by Eve 6 from their 1998 album Eve 6
- "Tongue-Tied", a song by Earshot from their 2004 album Two
- "Tongue Tied", a song by Status Quo from their 2007 album In Search of the Fourth Chord
- "Tongue Tied", a song by Stereo Skyline from their 2010 album Stuck on Repeat
- "Tongue Tied", album and song by Kate Earl, 2017

== Other uses ==
- Tietongue, a tropical tree
- Tongue-tie (tack), a piece of equipment sometimes used on racehorses
- "Tongue-Tied" (Orange Is the New Black), a 2015 television episode
- Miley Cyrus: Tongue Tied, a 2014 short film starring Miley Cyrus
