= Nevin Paynter =

Australian rules footballer

Personal information
- Full name: Nevin Frederick Paynter
- Born: 1 June 1930; Bentleigh, Victoria
- Died: 28 April 1981 (aged 50); Warrnambool, Victoria
- Original team: Hampton Rovers
- Height: 180 cm (5 ft 11 in)
- Weight: 80.5 kg (177 lb)

Playing career^{1}
Years	Club	Games (Goals)
1950–51, 1953	Melbourne	12 (0)
- ^{1} Playing statistics correct to the end of 1953.

Nevin Frederick Paynter (1 June 1930 – 28 April 1981) was an Australian rules footballer who played with Melbourne in the Victorian Football League (VFL).

== Family ==
The son of Frederick Paynter (1903–1967), and Ruby May Paynter (1903–1990), née Martin, Nevin Frederick Paynter was born at Bentleigh, Victoria on 1 June 1930.

== Death ==
He died at Warrnambool on 28 April 1981.
