= Unseen (short story collection) =

- First edition (publ. Puffin Books)
- Author: Paul Jennings
- Language: English
- Genre: Short story collection
- Publisher: Puffin Books
- Publication date: 1 January 1998
- Publication place: Australia
- Media type: Print
- Pages: 157 pp.
- ISBN: 0140389989

Unseen is a short story collection by Australian author Paul Jennings. It was first released in Australia in 1998 by Puffin Books is the ninth in a series of collections of short stories by Jennings.

The collection consists of eight stories.

== The stories ==
=== One-Finger Salute ===
A boy called Digit always gets the rude finger from the school bully when he walks home from school, and does nothing about it because he doesn't have middle fingers himself. So one day, he eats a lizard's tail, and he ends up growing new fingers. However, it is not long before his fingers become more of an embarrassment than anything else.

=== Round the Bend ===
On the way to a sports game, two boys called Ned and Derek run over a dog; they try to get the dog replaced before its owners find out. But later they find out the dogs owner keeps throwing stuffed dogs in front of cars, and guilts the man to buy another dog. WORTH $1000

=== Seeshell ===
A boy called Alan gets a job fishing with triplet brothers. He gets a crush on their sister, Shelly, though the brothers really hate it when anyone kisses her. One day, while fishing, they find a seashell that has an eye in it; whenever the shell opens, the nearest person sees a vision about something that does eventually come true.

=== Piddler on the Roof ===
A sequel to the Unmentionable story Little Squirt. When the water in Sydney becomes contaminated, Weesle is forced to stay with his aunt in the countryside. He dislikes his aunt because she is a health freak, and her son enjoys dobbing on Weesle whenever he does anything slightly wrong.

=== Ticker ===
An old man has a watch that runs on his movement whenever he wears it. When he dies, he loses it, and his wife is unable to feel happy. However, their grandson, Keith, tries to get the watch back and make his grandmother happy.

=== Guts ===
A man tries to buy land from another man. When the man owning the land refuses, the other man steals his car. The man sends his children, Nelson and Danni, to look for the car; however, the forest they live near is believed to be haunted by a ghost that can change shape, force people and animals into it, and eat them.

=== Shadows ===
A boy called Richard goes to the fairground, but has no money, so he offers a job to clean the floor of the house of mirrors. However, all the reflections seem to come to life.

=== Squawk Talk ===
A rude and foul mouthed boy gets a toilet seat stuck to his head (and a parrot following him) and insults whoever teases him about it. But when the boy tries to ask for help or when someone offers him help, the parrot forces him to repeat the insults he had said previously.

== Reception and awards ==
Unseen won the Queensland Premier's Literary Award for Children's Books in 1999.
