= Once (novel) =

Novel by Morris Gleitzman

- Author: Morris Gleitzman
- Series: Felix and Zelda
- Release number: 1
- Publisher: Puffin Books
- Publication date: 2005
- Pages: 160
- ISBN: 9780143301950
- OCLC: 76888577
- Dewey Decimal: 823.914
- LC Class: PZ7.G4824
- Followed by: Then (2009)

Once is a 2005 Best-Seller children's novel by Australian author Morris Gleitzman. It is about a Jewish boy named Felix who lived in Poland and is on a quest to find his book-keeper parents after he sees Nazis burning the books from a Catholic orphanage where he lived for over three years. He finds a girl named Zelda, unconscious in a burning house with her dead parents, and takes her with him. He protects her from confronting her parents' death through storytelling. Although Once is a work of fiction, Gleitzman was inspired by the story of Janusz Korczak, the events of World War II, and Hitler's attempt to exterminate the Jewish population of Europe.

Once was translated into German (Einmal) and was nominated for the 2010 Deutscher Jugendliteraturpreis; it won the 2011 Katholischer Kinder- und Jugendbuchpreis.

The sequels to the book are Then (2009), Now (2010), After (2012), Soon (2015) Maybe (2017), and Always (2021).In chronological order of Felix's life, the books are Once, Then, After, Soon, Maybe, Now, and Always.

== Development ==
Although Once is a work of fiction, Gleitzman was inspired by the story of Janusz Korczak, the events of World War II, and Hitler's attempt to exterminate the Jewish population of Europe. As research for the novel, Gleitzman read several books about and by young people in the Holocaust, including The King of Children by Betty Jean Lifton (a biography of Janusz Korczak), Salvaged Pages: Young Writers' Diaries of The Holocaust, edited by Alexander Zapruder, The Hidden Children by Jane Marks, Words to Outlive Us: Eyewitness Accounts From the Warsaw Ghetto, edited by Michał Grynberg, Witness: Voices From The Holocaust, edited by Joshua M. Greene and Shiva Kumar, A Childhood by Jona Oberski, Maus by Art Spiegelman, The Diary of a Young Girl by Anne Frank, Born Guilty by Peter Sichrovsky, The Hidden Children by Howard Greenfeld, Children of the Ghetto by Sheva Glas-Wiener, Konin: A Quest by Theo Richmond, The Boys by Martin Gilbert, Flares of Memory: Stories of Childhood During The Holocaust, edited by Anita Brostoff with Sheila Chamovitz, Yiddishland by Gerard Silvain and Henri Minczeles, Children With a Star by Debórah Dwork, and Ghetto Diary by Janusz Korczak.

== Reception ==
The Horn Book Guide described Once as "this is the rare Holocaust book for young readers that doesn't alleviate its dark themes with a comforting ending".

The School Library Journal recommends this book as a 'read aloud' book, and notes how it contrasts "how children would like to imagine their world with the tragic way that life sometimes unfolds."

Kirkus Reviews describes Felix's misconceptions of the world "heartbreaking", and described his story as being "packed with sadness", with a tinge of hope offered by the character inspired by Janusz Korczak.
