= Two Weeks with the Queen =

Novel by Morris Gleitzman

- Author: Morris Gleitzman
- Original title: Two Weeks in London
- Cover artist: Moira Millman
- Language: English
- Genre: Young adult, drama
- Publisher: Pan Books
- Publication date: 1990
- Publication place: Australia; England; United States
- Media type: Print (paperback)
- Pages: 127
- ISBN: 0-330-27183-0

Two Weeks with the Queen is a 1990 novel by Australian author Morris Gleitzman. It focuses on a boy named Colin Mudford, who is sent to live with relatives in England, while his brother is being treated for cancer.

== Plot summary ==
Colin Mudford, a 12 year old Australian, is sent to stay with his uncle Bob, aunt Iris and cousin Alistair in London while his brother, Luke, is being treated for cancer. In England, Colin, wanting to ask the Queen for good doctors, attempts to break into Buckingham Palace with Alistair, only for them both to get caught by the police.

After an unsuccessful attempt to sneak into the best cancer hospital in London, Colin meets a Welshman named Ted, whose friend Griff also has cancer. Ted introduces Colin to one of England's leading cancer experts, who then contacts Luke's doctors in Sydney and confirms that the cancer which Luke has is terminal. Colin then attempts revenge on the doctors by slashing the tyres on their cars, including Mercedes, BMW, Jaguar and Audi, only to be caught by Ted. Colin then storms back to Bob and Iris's house distraught, where Alistair gives Colin the idea that a possible cure may be found in South America.

Colin convinces Alistair to stow away with him on a cargo ship to South America the next day. However, when Colin admits that he slashed the tyres of several doctors' cars and that Ted caught him, Alistair warns Colin that Ted could be blamed for this, so Colin delays their trip to South America. The next day, Colin visits Ted at his home, and finds that he has been badly injured. Ted tells him that he was attacked by people in the street who disliked him, because he is gay. He then confesses to Colin that Griff is actually his lover, who is dying of AIDS.

As Ted is unable to walk due to his injuries, Colin goes to the hospital on his behalf to meet Griff, bringing him a letter from Ted as well as Griff's favourite food, tangerines. After enjoying a conversation with Colin, Griff asks him to visit him again. After Griff is taken back to his ward by a nurse, Colin finds a spare wheelchair in the hospital which he gives to Ted to allow him to leave his house. Colin then takes Ted to the hospital to see Griff and the couple thank Colin for reuniting them. Several days later, after Ted has recovered, Colin goes to visit the couple in the hospital, only to learn that Griff has died.

When Alistair confesses to Iris his and Colin's plans to travel to South America, she punishes both boys, and the house is fortified against any escape attempts. When Colin decides to accept Luke's fate, he asks Iris to let him return to his family, but she forbids it, saying that any attempt to escape will not work because they will not allow him on the plane with his return ticket, unless he is seen off by an adult guardian.

The next morning, with much difficulty, Colin sneaks out of the house and meets Ted at the airport. Ted signs Colin's forms and they say their goodbyes. Iris catches Colin trying to escape and conflict is created; Alistair stands up to her, which forces Iris to see reason and let Colin go. Colin travels back to Sydney to see Luke, who wakes up, happy to see Colin.

== Characters ==
- Colin Mudford: A 12-year-old Australian boy determined to convince a cancer expert to treat his younger brother. He is kind, friendly, and adventurous.
- Luke Mudford: Colin's 8-year-old brother who has terminal cancer. He is in Sydney for the entire novel, undergoing treatment.
- Alistair: Colin's shy 13-year-old English cousin. While Colin is in London, Alistair becomes involved with Colin's ambitious schemes to find a cure for Luke's cancer.
- Aunty Iris: Colin's aunt and Alistair's overbearing mother. She is friendly toward Colin but is frightened that he is so open about Luke's cancer.
- The Queen: Elizabeth II is unconcerned about Luke's illness and does not respond to any of Colin's letters and requests. A liaison officer writes a letter to Colin on her behalf at the end of the book, which Colin leaves in an aeroplane's ashtray.
- Uncle Bob: Uncle Bob is Colin's grumpy uncle. He thinks lowly of the British royal family, as well as the City of London. He often joins his wife in telling their son, Alistair, what to do.
- Ted Caldicot: A gay Welshman who listens to Colin about Luke as his partner, Griff, has a similar issue. Contrasted with the other adults in the book Ted is characterized as warm and open, especially about cancer.
- Griff Price: Ted's partner of six years is being treated for AIDS-related cancer in the hospital. His favourite food is tangerines.

== Themes ==
Gleitzman depicts the denial and anger that accompany grief, portraying Colin's egocentricity, spunk, and pain compassionately and without condescension. Neatly tied together by the incidents involving the Queen, this mixture of genuine emotion and humor makes for an engaging story.

== Adaptation for theatre ==
The book was adapted for the stage by Mary Morris in April 1992, and premièred at the Sydney Festival in the same year. Directed by Wayne Harrison, it received praise from its first performances, and has since been shown throughout the world, including England, Canada, Japan, the United States, Cuba, and Portugal.

== Reception ==
Two Weeks with the Queen won the Family Award in 1990.

Todd Morning, reviewing the book for School Library Journal, describes Colin as "incredibly feisty and brave", and criticises the book's "breakneck" pace, stating that this made it difficult to get to know Colin. Reviewers for the School Library Journal described Gleitzman's pacing in the audiobook as "wonderful", showing Colin's growing maturity.

Stephens regards Two Weeks with the Queen as being unusual in contemporary Australian children's literature because Colin is presented as having agency – he is capable of making decisions and taking action to change the world around him – even though he does not do so in the way he first intended. Maya Sen, writing for The Canberra Times, praises Colin's determination and character development, and enjoyed the book's humour and direct treatment of its themes.

When the play was performed in the United Kingdom, according to Gleitzman, the Australian Republican themes of the play proved controversial.
