= Tongue-Tied (short story collection) =

First edition

Tongue-Tied is the tenth in a series of collections of short stories by Australian author Paul Jennings. It was released in 2002.

== The stories ==
=== Tongue-Tied ===
A boy called Jeremy tries to get a rare fish for a girl in his school called Jill, believing that doing so will make her want to kiss him.

=== Lennie Lighthouse ===
A boy called Lennie has teeth that glow in the dark. He has never lived with his mother. But one day, when he finds a letter mentioning where his mother might be, his friend Ritcho tries to help him meet her for the first time.

=== Sniffex ===
A sequel to the Unmentionable story Ex Poser. Boffin has now invented a smell detector, which he hopes will help him find out who has been flatulating every day in class.

=== The Hat ===
A boy called Jason moves from Melbourne to the Queensland rainforest to live with his father (because his mother, who had divorced, has died). The last thing Jason has to remind him of his mother is a hat, which he always tries to retrieve every time he loses it (even if it means risking his life), but his abilities are pushed to the limit when he loses it while being ordered to stand guard over the last known individual of a species of bilby.

=== Spot the Dog ===
While sick in bed, a boy called Tony is asked to play a game of Spot the Dog by his mother, whose pictures of landmarks in their home town are very detailed, but lack people. While looking over the picture, the boy seems to end up sucked into the game, and can't figure out how to get out of this strange world.

=== Hailstone Bugs ===
As punishment for allowing his mouse to breed, a boy called Troy has his head-lopper confiscated, which upsets him because he was planning to use it in an upcoming act. Soon after he finds a weird species which lives inside hailstones, and he tries to put them to a good use.

=== Shake ===
Two twin brothers, Byron and Gavin, find a box while digging in the vegetable patch; they fight over who should own it, despite the fact that they are so close to each other that they rarely fight. But when Gavin decides to stop arguing, Byron refuses his brother's handshake. Gavin then has an accident and dies, resulting in Byron feeling guilty about his decision, and wants nothing but to shake Gavin's hand, even though he knows it's never going to happen. But one day, he discovers what is in the box: an enchanted pair of glasses, which can allow him to do something he never thought he'd be able to do.

=== Popping Off ===
A boy called Bill is at risk of getting kicked out of his flat, because he has a dog that flatulates because it can't bark.
