= Bentleigh West Primary School =

Coordinates: 37°55′11″S 145°01′38″E

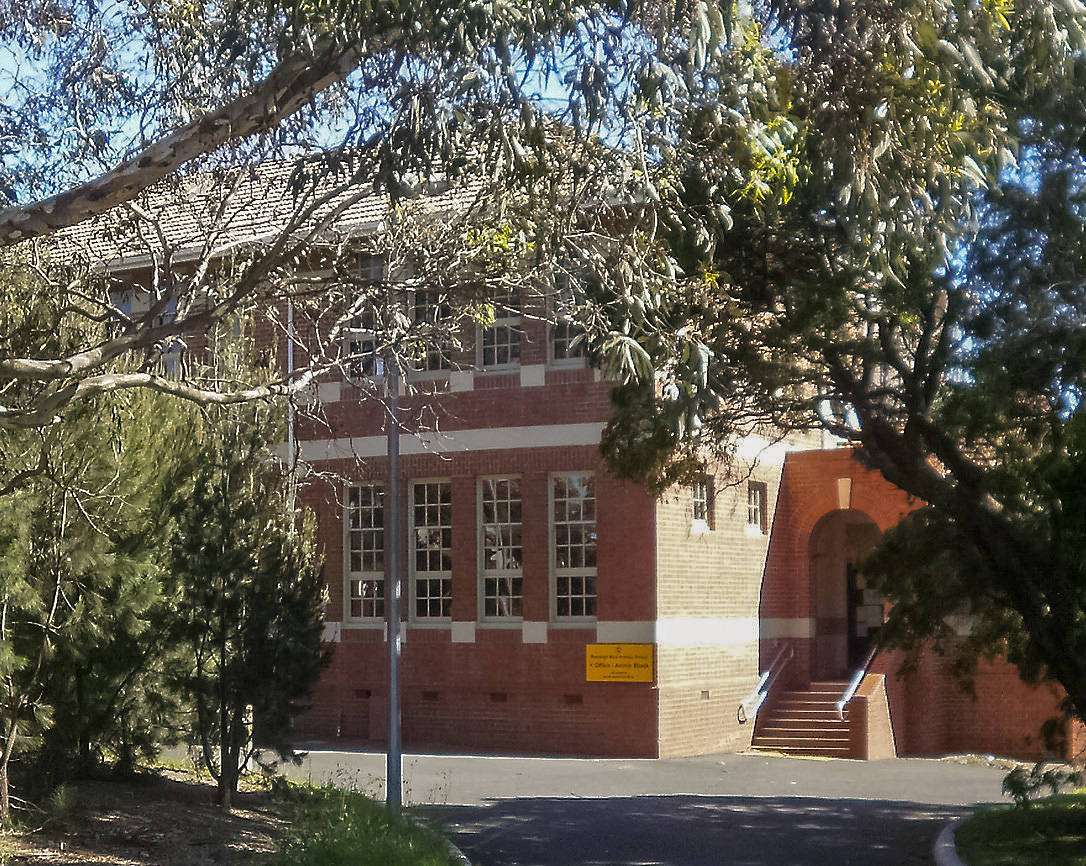
- Bentleigh west primary school
- Bentleigh; City of Glen Eira, Victoria; Australia

Information
- School type: Primary school
- Principal: Sarah Asome
- Years offered: Prep–6
- Website: www.bentleighwestps.vic.edu.au

Bentleigh West Primary School is a government primary school located in the suburb of Bentleigh in the City of Glen Eira, about 13 kilometres (8.1 mi) out of Melbourne's city centre, in the state of Victoria, Australia.

The school has won a number of environmental awards. As of 2023 the principal is Sarah Asome.

== History ==
The school was established in the 1930s and named Bentleigh West, despite the lack of a suburb of that name, as it was considered more fashionable to live on the western side of Bentleigh (west of the Frankston railway line), closer to Brighton East and Brighton than the other side of the line.

Major building works were finished in late 2010.

== Staff ==
As of 2023 the principal is Sarah Asome.

== Awards ==
=== Environmental awards ===
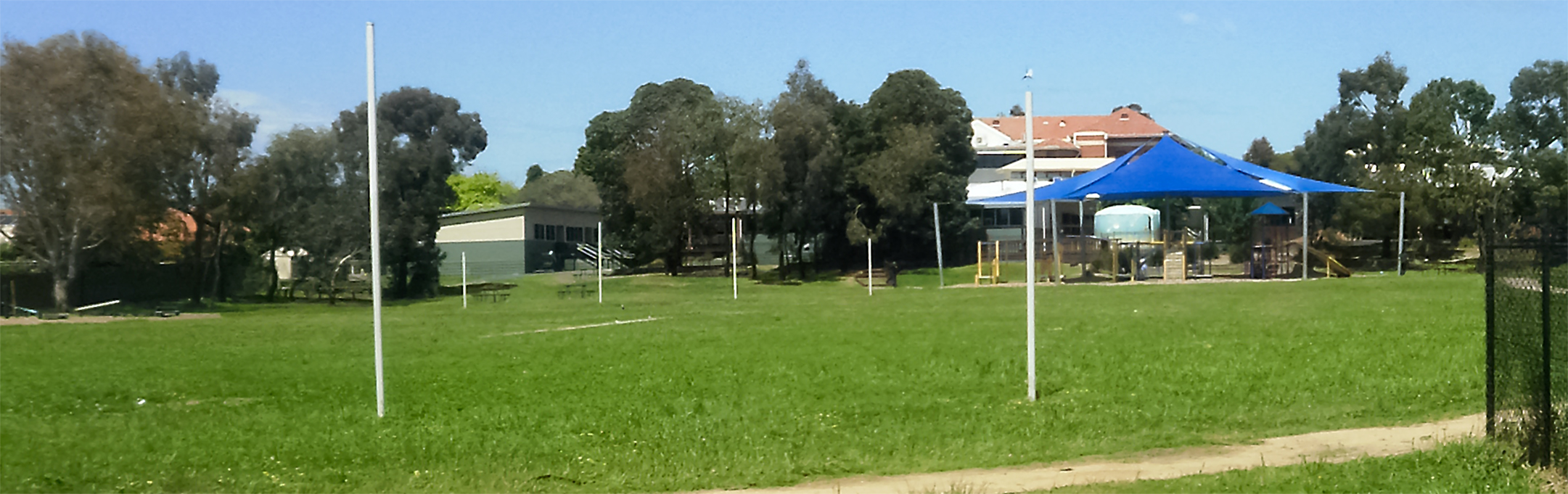
Bentleigh west primary school

It has been awarded the Australian Sustainable Schools Accreditation 5 Star Award, the Water Wise Accreditation, the Water - Learn it! Live it! accreditation, and was 2005 Regional Winner of the State Gardens Award.

The school was one of ten selected for a "greening grant in May 2005" from Greening Australia.

In 2007 the school was recognised for its efforts in the Education Programs category of the Savewater! Awards.

In the 2015 ResourceSmart Education Awards, Bentleigh West won ResourceSmart Water School of the Year, and was a finalist in both the Community Leadership category and overall School of the Year. In addition, Mrs Brown was also nominated as Teacher of the Year.

=== Faculty awards ===
Leonie Brown, who co-ordinates the school's environmental program, was chosen from 2,400 teachers to win one of the Australian Scholarships Group Community Merit Awards 2005.

Sarah Asome won the Outstanding Primary Teacher Award at the 2015 Victorian Education Excellence Awards, for her work in the area of dyslexia.

=== Sport ===
Student Theodore Petrakos won one of four 2006 Victorian School Sports Awards.

=== Other school awards ===
The school was a finalist in the Outstanding Inclusive Education Award for 2015.

The school has also been awarded Performance and Development Culture Accreditation.

=== Awards offered by the school ===
The Paul Jennings Award is a competition that takes place every year. Grade 5 and 6 students each enter a short story containing a sentence from one of Paul Jennings' books. The award is presented to the best story and the medal is presenting on the last day of term 4.

== Notable alumni ==
- John Romeril, Australian playwright
- Paul Jennings, Australian children's author
- Georgie Stone, Australian transgender activist
- Jeffrey Walker, actor director
