= Oh! (TV channel) =

Australian TV channel

- Country: Australia

Programming
- Language(s): English
- Picture format: 4:3 576i (SDTV)

Ownership
- Owner: Optus Television

History
- Launched: 1 October 1999
- Closed: 30 November 2002
- Replaced by: FOX8

Oh! was an Australian cable TV channel owned by Optus Television. It served as the services's premier general entertainment channel until it was replaced by FOX8 in 2002. Programming was mostly sourced from Warner Brothers Television. After the channel's closure, the content was given to Foxtel and XYZnetworks channels, with most of the Warner Brothers shows moving to Arena.

== Programming ==
- 77 Sunset Strip
- Action
- ALF
- Baby Blues
- Babylon 5
- Batman: The Animated Series
- The Client
- The Crocodile Hunter
- The Drew Carey Show
- The Dukes of Hazzard
- Family Matters
- Friends
- Full House
- Growing Pains
- Hangin' with Mr. Cooper
- Head of the Class
- Here's Lucy
- I'll Fly Away
- The Jenny Jones Show
- Kung Fu: The Legend Continues
- La Femme Nikita
- Lawless
- Lois & Clark: The New Adventures of Superman
- Maverick
- Men in Black: The Series
- Mr. & Mrs. Smith
- The Oblongs
- The Road Runner Show
- SeaChange
- The Secret Life of Us
- The Sopranos
- Static Shock
- Suddenly Susan
- Superman: The Animated Series
- Trinity
- WCW Thunder
- WCW Saturday Night
- Wicked!
- The Zeta Project
