= Toad Rage =

1999 children's novel by Morris Gleitzman

- First edition cover.
- Author: Morris Gleitzman
- Language: English
- Publisher: Puffin Books
- Publication date: 1999
- Publication place: Australia
- Pages: 152 pp (first edition)
- ISBN: 0-141-30655-6
- Followed by: Toad Heaven

Toad Rage is a children's novel by Australian author Morris Gleitzman. It was first published in Australia in 1999 by Puffin Books.

Laika Studios was planning to make a CGI feature-length or short film based on the book by Morris Gleitzman.

== Plot summary ==
Limpy, a young cane toad who narrowly escapes from becoming roadkill, enters the gates of the Olympic Games and finds a sweet girl who once again saves him from being squashed. Limpy tries and fails to have cane toads become the Sydney Olympic mascots. Limpy finally finds a way to protect his family from the terror of the highway. Soon, Limpy's plan succeeds, and cane toads everywhere (or almost everywhere) are safe again.

== Sequels ==
This book was followed by four other books: Toad Away, Toad Heaven, Toad Surprise, and Toad Delight.

== Reception ==
Reviews for Toad Rage were positive, with Publishers Weekly describing the book as "saucy fun from start to finish". The School Library Journal review notes the adventurous story and the colourful use of Australian slang (with a glossary in the back) as being key to a "hugely funny read". A review of the audiobook by SLJ recommends it for boys and reluctant readers due to the "gross-out" humour. The Washington Post review gives some context of how cane toads in Australia are viewed and notes some practices might make readers squeamish but otherwise recommends the book. A reviewer for Kirkus Reviews described Toad Rage as "both solid entertainment and a barbed commentary on the importance of looks". A reviewer for Booklist recommends it for grades 3-6 and says it will give readers "plenty of laughs".
