= Sticky Beak =

Novel by Morris Oleitzman

- Author: Morris Gleitzman
- Language: English
- Series: Blabber Mouth
- Genre: Children's novel
- Publisher: multiple
- Publication date: 1993
- Publication place: Australia
- ISBN: 1-74093-009-6
- Preceded by: Blabber Mouth
- Followed by: Gift of the Gab

Sticky Beak is a children's novel first published in 1993. Written by English-born Australian writer Morris Gleitzman, it is the sequel to Blabber Mouth. The novel is set in Australia and follows the misadventures of a mute Australian girl called Rowena Batts. Sticky Beak won the CROW award in 1994.

== Plot summary ==
Sticky Beak picks up from where Blabber Mouth ends. Rowena's father is now married to her teacher, and at a function she throws a plate of custard and jelly into a fan, splattering it over everyone. As she tries to avoid the consequences, she rescues an abused cockatoo from the neighbourhood bully, Darryn Peck.
