= Paul Jennings (Australian author) =

Australian children's author (born 1943)

Paul Jennings AM
- Born: 30 April 1943 (age 83); Heston, Middlesex, England
- Occupation: Novelist
- Children: 6
- Writing career
- Period: 1985–present
- Genre: Twist ending
- Website: www.pauljennings.com.au

Paul Jennings AM (born 30 April 1943) is an English-born Australian writer for children, young adults and adults. He is best known for his short stories that lead the reader through an unusual series of events and end with a twist. Many of Jennings' stories were adapted for the cult classic children's television series Round the Twist. He collaborated with Morris Gleitzman on the book series Wicked!, which was adapted into an animated TV series in 2000, and Deadly!.

== Early life and education ==
Paul Jennings was born on 30 April 1943 in Heston, Middlesex (now part of Hounslow in London). In 1949, his family emigrated to Australia.

Jennings first attended Bentleigh West Primary School in Bentleigh, a suburb of Melbourne, and then Caulfield Grammar School.

Jennings graduated with a Bachelor of Education Studies from Frankston Teachers' College and taught at Frankston State School, Kangaroo Flat State School, the Turana Youth Training Centre and the Royal Children's Hospital State School in Mount Eliza. He then went to the Lincoln Institute of Health Sciences (now part of Monash).

== Career ==
After graduating, Jennings worked as a speech pathologist then lecturer in special education at the Burwood State College and later, in 1979, Senior Lecturer in Language and Literature at Warrnambool Institute of Advanced Education (both now part of Deakin University).

In 1985, Jennings' first book of short stories, Unreal!, was published, during which he worked as a teacher, lecturer and speech therapist. Jennings began writing for children when his son, aged 11, was having trouble reading.

Jennings' short stories were adapted for the first two seasons of children's television series Round the Twist in 1989 and 1992, and then later in 1998 for the only season of series Driven Crazy.

In 2020 Jennings' memoir, Untwisted: The Story of My Life, was published by Allen & Unwin. He started writing it 10 years earlier, and it is his longest piece of writing. In it, Jennings examines many aspects of his life, including harbouring feelings of guilt about disliking his cold and emotionally abusive father, and having thoughts of attacking him.

== Personal life ==
Jennings first marriage was at age 22. He has six children and is a great-grandfather. Jennings' third wife is comedian Mary-Anne Fahey. He has two stepchildren and two adopted children, who have helped to inform some of his stories about children looking for their biological parents. Jennings currently resides in Warrnambool, Victoria.

== Awards and honours ==
- In 1992, Jennings received a Gold Puffin Award, for selling one million books in Australia.
- In 1993, Jennings won an Angus & Robertson Bookworld Award, as Australian Author – Children's Literary Medal Criteria, "Best Selling Author" and "Most Valued Author".
- In 1993, Jennings was made Victorian of the Year – Western Region, presented by the Australia Day (Victoria) Committee, for services to the Victorian community.
- In 1995, Jennings was appointed Member in the General Division of the Order of Australia (AM), in the Australia Day 1995 Honours List, for service to children's literature.
- In 1998, Jennings was named Favourite Australian Author in Dymocks Children's Choice Awards.
- In 2000, Jennings was awarded the Dromkeen Medal, for significant contributions to the appreciation and development of children's literature.
- In 2010, Jennings was made a Fellow of Monash University.
- In 2019, Jennings received a Lifetime Achievement Award from the Children's Book Council of Australia.

=== Awards for titles ===
Young Australians' Best Book Award (YABBA):

1987 Unreal! – Winner, best book for older readers;
1988 Unbelievable! – Winner, best book for older readers;
1989 Uncanny! – Winner, best book for older readers;
1989 The Cabbage Patch Fib – Winner, best book for younger readers;
1990 The Paw Thing – Winner, best book for younger readers;
1991 Round The Twist – Winner, best book for older readers;
1992 Quirky Tails – Winner, fiction for younger readers;
1992 Unmentionable! – Winner, fiction for older readers;
1993 Unbearable! – Winner, fiction for older readers;
1994 Spooner Or Later – Winner, picture book section;
1994 Undone! – Winner, fiction for younger readers;
1995 Duck For Cover – Winner, picture book section;
1995 The Gizmo – Winner, fiction for younger readers;
1996 The Gizmo Again – Winner, fiction for younger readers;
1998 Wicked! – Winner, fiction for older readers;
2002 Tongue Tied – Winner, fiction for Younger Readers.

Canberra's Own Outstanding List (COOL Award):

1991 Round The Twist – Winner, Primary Section;
1992 The Cabbage Patch Fib – Winner, Primary Section;
1993 Unreal! – Winner, Primary Section;
1995 The Gizmo – Winner, Primary Section;
1997 The Paw Thing – Winner, Secondary Section;
1998 Wicked! – Winner, Primary Section;
2001 The Paw Thing – Winner, Coolest Book of the Decade.

West Australian Young Readers' Book Award (WAYRBA):

1989 Unreal! – Winner of Special Award, Highest Ranked Australian Author, Secondary Readers Section;
1991 The Paw Thing – Winner of Hoffman Award, Highest Ranked Australian Author and Primary Readers Section;
1992 Uncanny! – Winner of Hoffman Award, Highest Ranked Australian Author and Primary Readers Section;
1994 Unbearable! – Winner of Hoffman Award, Highest Ranked Australian Author and Primary Readers Section;
1995 Undone! – Winner of Hoffman Award, Highest Ranked Australian Author and Primary Readers Section.

Kids Own Australian Literature Award (KOALA):

1990 Unreal! – Winner Secondary Readers Section;
1992 Unmentionable! – Winner Infant/Primary Readers Section;
1993 Unbearable! – Winner Infant/Primary Readers Section;
1994 Undone! – Winner Infant/Primary Readers Section;
1995 Duck For Cover – Winner Infant/Primary Readers Section;
1996 Uncovered! – Winner Senior Book.

Kids Reading Oz Choice Award (KROC):

1990 Uncanny! – Winner Most Popular Oz Book;
1991 Unbelievable! – Winner Most Popular Oz Book;
1992 Unreal! – Winner Most Popular Oz Book;
1993 Undone! – Winner Most Popular Oz Book;
1994 Undone! – Winner Most Popular Oz Book;
1995 The Gizmo – Winner Most Popular Oz Book;
1996 Round the Twist – Winner Most Popular Oz Book;
1997 Wicked! – Winner Most Popular Oz Book;
1998 Wicked! – Winner Most Popular Oz Book;
1999 The Gizmo – Best Oz Children's Book;
2000 – No.s 1, 3, 4, 6, 7 and 10 in the Top Ten Books.

Books I Love Best Yearly (BILBY Award):

1992 Unreal! – Winner Read Alone Primary Section;
1994 Undone! – Winner Read Alone Primary Section;
1996 The Gizmo – Winner Read Australian Primary Section.

Australian Writers' Guild:

1990, AWGIE Award – Best Children's Adaptation (TV) Round The Twist;
1993, AWGIE Award – Best Children's Adaptation (TV) Round The Twist – Episode 5.

ABPA Joyce Nicholson Award:

1993, Spooner Or Later – winner, best designed children's book of the year.

Wilderness Society Environment Award for Children's Literature:

1994, Picture Book – The Fisherman and the Theefyspray.

Prix Jeunesse Award:

1994 – Winner Round The Twist (Television Series).

Australian Publishers Association – Book Industry Awards:

1997 – Peoples Choice Award for Children's Books for Come Back Gizmo.

Christian Schools' Book Award:

1998 – awarded to Paul Jennings and Jane Tanner for The Fisherman and the Theefyspray.

Dymocks Children's Choice Awards:

1998 – Favourite Australian Younger Reader Book, Sink The Gizmo;
1998 – Favourite Australian Older Reader Book, Wicked.

Queensland Premiers Literary Award:

1999 – Best Children's Book Unseen!.

== Bibliography ==
=== Short story collections ===
- Unreal! Eight Surprising Stories (1985)
- Unbelievable! More Surprising Stories (1986)
- Quirky Tails! More Oddball Stories (1987)
- Uncanny! Even More Surprising Stories (1988)
- Unbearable! More Bizarre Stories (1990)
- Unmentionable! More Amazing Stories (1991)
- The Naked Ghost, Burp! and Blue Jam (1991)
- Undone! More Mad Endings (1993)
- Uncovered! Weird, Weird Stories (1995)
- Unseen! (1998)
- Tongue Tied! (2002)

=== Picture books ===
==== Rascal series ====
- Rascal The Dragon
- Rascal in Trouble
- Rascal's Trick
- Rascal Takes Off
- Rascal at the Show
- Rascal and the Cheese
- Rascal And Little Flora
- Rascal and the Hot Air Balloon
- Rascal and the Monster
- Rascal Goes Fishing
- Rascal and the Dragon Droppings
- Little Rascal to the Rescue
- Rascal Plays Up
- Rascal Runs Away
- Rascal's Shadow
- Rascal and the Bad Smell
- Rascal Bumps His Head
- Rascal's Big Day

==== Miscellaneous ====
- Teacher Eater (1991)
- Grandad's Gifts (1992)
- The Fisherman and the Theefyspray (1994)

=== Chapter books ===
==== Cabbage Patch series ====
- The Cabbage Patch Fib (1988)
- The Cabbage Patch War (1996)
- The Cabbage Patch Pong (2002)
- The Cabbage Patch Curse (2004)

==== Gizmo series ====
- The Gizmo (1994)
- The Gizmo Again (1995)
- Come Back Gizmo (1996)
- Sink The Gizmo (1997)

==== Singenpoo series ====
- The Paw Thing (1989)
- Singenpoo Strikes Again (1998)
- Singenpoo Shoots Through (1999)
- Singenpoo's Secret Weapon (2001)

==== Miscellaneous ====
- The Spitting Rat (1999)
- Sucked In (2000)
- Maggot (2003)
- The Lorikeet Tree (2023)

=== Novels ===
Deadly series (co-written with Morris Gleitzman)

1. Nude (2000)
2. Brats (2000)
3. Stiff (2000)
4. Hunt (2000)
5. Grope (2000)
6. Pluck (2000)

Wicked series (co-written with Morris Gleitzman)

1. The Slobberers (1997)
2. Battering Rams (1997)
3. Croaked (1997)
4. Dead Ringer (1997)
5. The Creeper (1997)
6. Till Death Do Us Apart (1997)

==== YA novels ====
- How Hedley Hopkins Did a Dare (2005)
- The Nest (2009)

=== Puzzle and joke books ===
1. Spooner or Later (1992)
2. Freeze A Crowd (1996)
3. Duck For Cover (1997)
4. Spit It Out (2003)

=== Compilations and bind-ups ===
- Thirteen! Unpredictable Tales (1995)
- Wicked: All six books in one (1998)
- Uncollected: Every Story from Unreal!, Unbelievable!, and Quirky Tails (1998)
- Uncollected: Volume Two: Every Story from Uncanny!, Unbearable!, and Unmentionable! (1999)
- Uncollected: Volume Three: Every Story from Undone!, Uncovered!, and Unseen! (2000)
- Deadly: All six books in one (2000)
- The Fantastic And Amazing Gizmo (2002)
- The Many Adventures of Singenpoo (2002)
- The Cabbage Patch Fibs (2002)
- Paul Jennings' Funniest Stories (2005)
- Paul Jennings' Weirdest Stories (2006)
- Paul Jennings' Spookiest Stories (2007)
- Paul Jennings' Trickiest stories (2008)
- Unreal! The Ultimate Collection: 30 Stories in 30 Years (2015)

=== Miscellaneous ===
- Round the Twist (1989)
- Round The Twist #1: Pink Bow Tie & Nails (a graphic novel) (1993)
- The Paul Jennings Superdiary 1996
- The Paul Jennings Superdiary 1997
- The Paul Jennings Superdiary 2002
- The Bird Said Nothing (eBook) (2012)

=== Adult non-fiction ===
The Reading Bug...and how you can help your child to catch it (2008)

=== Memoir ===
- Untwisted : the story of my life. Crows Nest, NSW: Allen & Unwin. 2020.

=== Critical studies and reviews of Jennings's work ===
Untwisted

- Smith, Barnaby (January–February 2021). "Winning the lottery : Paul Jennings's unusual new memoir". Australian Book Review. 428: 36–37.

== Television ==
- Round The Twist (1989–2001)
- Driven Crazy (1998)
- Wicked! (2000-2001)

== See also ==
- List of Caulfield Grammar School people
