= Morris Gleitzman =

Australian writer

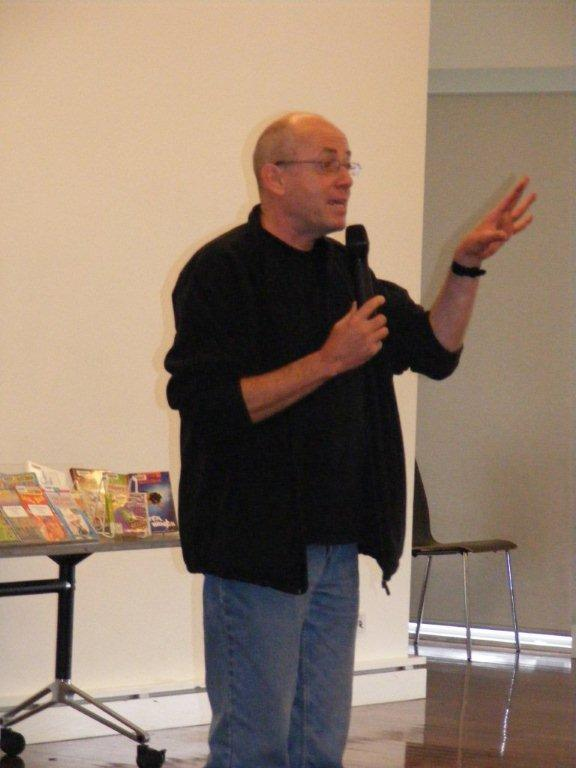
- Gleitzman in 2011
- Born: 9 January 1953 (age 73); Sleaford, Lincolnshire, England
- Education: University of Canberra
- Occupation: Novelist
- Writing career
- Notable works: The Toad series, The Once series, Two Weeks with the Queen
- Website: morrisgleitzman.com

Morris Gleitzman (born 9 January 1953) is an Australian author of children's and young adult fiction. He has gained recognition for sparking an interest in AIDS in his novel Two Weeks with the Queen (1990).

He has co-written many children's series with another Australian children's author, Paul Jennings. One of Gleitzman and Jennings's collaborations, the Wicked! book series, was adapted into an animated series in 2000.

Gleitzman has also published three collections of his newspaper columns for The Age and The Sydney Morning Herald as books for an adult readership, and he used to write for the popular Norman Gunston Show in the 1970s. His latest book in the Once series, Always, was released in 2021. He is also known for his Toad series of books.

In February 2018, Gleitzman was named the Australian Children's Laureate for 2018/2019.

== Early life ==
Gleitzman was born in the town of Sleaford, Lincolnshire, on 9 January 1953. He has one brother and one sister. His dad, Phillip Gleitzman, is an auditor, and his mother, Pamela, was a Bates employee.

He attended Chislehurst and Sidcup Grammar School in Bexley, England.

In 1969, when Gleitzman was 16, he and his family moved to Sydney. In Australia he got a job as a paperboy, bottle-shop shelf-stacker, store Santa Claus, frozen chicken defroster, fashion-design assistant and sugar-mill employee. He attended the University of Canberra.

After university Gleitzman worked for ten years as a screenwriter. During these years he wrote, among other things, material for the Norman Gunston album Nylon Degrees.

== Bibliography ==
Year	Title	Imprint	ISBN	Notes
1987	The Other Facts of Life	Penguin Books	ISBN 014008410X	First novel, adapted from screen play
1989	Two Weeks with the Queen	Pan Books	ISBN 0330271830	
1990	Second childhood	McPhee Gribble/Penguin	ISBN 014014465X	
1991	Misery Guts	Pan Australia	ISBN 0330272314	
1992	Worry Warts	Piper Australia	ISBN 0330272462	Sequel to Misery Guts.
1993	Blabber Mouth	Piper Australia	ISBN 0330273531	Adapted into a play of the same name by Mary Morris in 1996.
1994	Sticky Beak	Piper Australia	ISBN 0330274066	Sequel to Blabber Mouth.
1995	Puppy Fat	Piper	ISBN 0330342118	Sequel to Misery Guts and Worry Warts.
1996	Belly Flop	Pan Books	ISBN 0330356844	
1997	Water Wings	Pan Macmillan Australia	ISBN 0330358863	Loose sequel to Belly Flop.
1998	Bumface	Puffin Books	ISBN 0140387978	
1998	Wicked!	Puffin Books	ISBN 0141300396	Co-written with Paul Jennings.
1999	Gift of the Gab	Puffin Books	ISBN 0140387986	Sequel to Blabber Mouth and Sticky Beak.
2000	Toad Rage	Puffin Books	ISBN 0141306556	
2000	Self Helpless: 57 Pieces of Crucial Advice for People Who Need a Bit More Time to Get It Right	Penguin	ISBN 014029256X	
2001	Adults Only	Penguin	ISBN 0141308370	
2001	Deadly!	Puffin Books	ISBN 0143300245	Co-written with Paul Jennings.
2001	Toad Heaven	Puffin Books	ISBN 014130880X	Sequel to Toad Rage.
2002	Boy Overboard	Puffin Books	ISBN 0141308389	
2003	Teacher's Pet	Penguin Books	ISBN 0140387994	
2003	Toad Away	Puffin Books	ISBN 0143300474	Sequel to Toad Rage and Toad Heaven.
2004	Worm Story	Penguin Books	ISBN 0143301969	
2004	Girl Underground	Puffin Books	ISBN 0143300466	Sequel to Boy Overboard.
2005	Once	Puffin Books	ISBN 0143301950	"...Gleitzman delivers a sharp sense of what it must have been like to be a child during the Holocaust, forced to grow up far too quickly."
2006	Aristotle's Nostril	Penguin Books	ISBN 0143301977	
2006	Doubting Thomas	Puffin Books	ISBN 9780143302612	
2007	Give Peas a Chance	Puffin Books	ISBN 9780141324111	Collection of short stories. Features characters from Misery Guts, Blabber Mouth, Second Childhood, Belly Flop, Adults Only, Teacher's Pet, Worm Story and Aristotle's Nostril.
2008	Toad Surprise	Puffin Books	ISBN 9780143304166	Sequel to Toad Rage, Toad Heaven and Toad Away.
2008	Then	Penguin	ISBN 9780670072781	Sequel to Once.
2009	Grace	Viking	ISBN 0670073903	
2010	Now	Viking	ISBN 9780670074372	Sequel to Once and Then "Readers of the first two books will recognize a great deal, and those who have not should read them to gain a fuller picture of the years before and those in which we live."
2010	Tickled Onions and Other Funny Stories	Puffin Books	ISBN 9780143305606	Collection of short stories. Contains some stories from Give Peas a Chance.
2011	Too Small to Fail	Puffin Books	ISBN 9780143306429	
2011	Pizza Cake: And Other Funny Stories	Puffin Books	ISBN 9780143305989	Collection of short stories. Contains some stories from Tickled Onions.
2012	After	Penguin Books	ISBN 9780670075447	Sequel to Once, Then and Now.
2013	Extra Time	Penguin Books	ISBN 9780143307754	
2014	Loyal Creatures	Penguin Books	ISBN 9780670077427	
2015	Soon	Viking	ISBN 0670078875	Sequel to Once, Then, Now and After.
2016	Toad Delight	Penguin Random House	ISBN 0143309234	Sequel to Toad Rage, Toad Heaven, Toad Away and Toad Surprise.
2016	Snot Chocolate	Penguin Random House	ISBN 9780143309222	Collection of short stories.
2017	Maybe	Penguin Random House	ISBN 9780670079377	Sequel to Once, Then, Now, After and Soon
2018	Funny Stories: and Other Funny Stories	Puffin Books	ISBN 0143793381	Collection of short stories. Contains all stories from Give Peas A Chance, Pizza Cake and Snot Chocolate, plus one new story.
2018	Help Around the House	Puffin Books	ISBN 0143793233	
2021	Always	Viking	ISBN 9780143793243	Sequel to Once, Then, Now, After, Soon and Maybe.
2023	Digging Up Dad: And Other Hopeful (and Funny) Stories	Penguin Random House	ISBN 9781760890940	Collection of short stories.
2024	Tweet	Penguin Random House	ISBN 9781761343742	

== Awards ==
- 1993
  - BILBY Award (Blabber Mouth)
  - CROW Award (Blabber Mouth)
- 1994
  - CROW Award (Sticky Beak)
- 1997
  - COOL Award (Belly Flop)
- 1998
  - BILBY Award (Bumface)
  - COOL Award (Bumface)
  - KOALA Award (Bumface)
  - YABBA Award (Bumface)
- 2001
  - YABBA Award: Older Readers (Toad Rage)
- 2008
  - ANTO Cole Award (Toad Rage)
- 2013
  - COOL Award (Pizza Cake)
- 2016
  - Children's Book Council of Australia Book of the Year: Younger Readers (Soon)
