= Wicked! (TV series) =

- Genre: Comedy horror
- Created by: Paul Jennings; Morris Gleitzman
- Written by: Mary Morris; Andrea Del Bosco
- Directed by: Jo Boag; Paul Leadon
- Composers: Ian Nichols; Phillip Lane
- Countries of origin: Australia; France; Germany
- Original language: English
- No. of seasons: 1
- No. of episodes: 26 (+1 film)

Production
- Executive producers: Gerry Travers; John Travers; Carmel Travers; Philip Bowman (film); Michael Carrington (for the BBC)
- Producers: Margaret Parkes; Suzanne Ryan
- Running time: 22 minutes
- Production companies: Energee Entertainment; RTV Family Entertainment; France Animation

Original release
- Network: Seven Network (Australia); TF1 (France); BBC (United Kingdom)
- Release: 18 November 2000 – 2001

Wicked! is an Australian animated television series based on the book series of the same name by Paul Jennings and Morris Gleitzman. It was co-produced by Energee Entertainment in Sydney, Australia and France Animation.

The series is about two step-siblings named Rory and Dawn as they try to protect their own town from viruses caused by the Appleman, a man with a head shaped like a half-eaten apple. It was intended as a "comedy of horrors" aimed at children aged 8 to 13.

Wicked! began with 13 short webisodes released on the eKidz website in late 2000. The series ran for 26 episodes and an 80-minute film. By the end of 2001, it had become Energee Entertainment's most successful series, with over €8 million in sales. However, the producers were unable to continue the series, as Energee shut down in 2002 due to financial losses from its film The Magic Pudding.

In Australia, the series aired on both the Seven Network and the Oh! channel by Optus Television. Internationally, the series was picked up by the BBC in the United Kingdom and TF1 in France.

== Plot ==
Dawn and Rory are two step-siblings who live with their newlywed parents in a small Australian town called Terngabbie. They find themselves terrorized by the Appleman, a mysterious evil scientist with a head shaped like an eaten apple. He is infected with a virus and plans to contaminate everything around him with the help of his mutants.

== Characters ==
The main characters.

- Dawn is a redheaded girl who lost her mom in a bus accident. She likes sports and video games, but she has some trouble in school, where she is failing science and gets bullied by Tori and Tiffany. Dawn and her new stepbrother Rory are always bickering, but they find themselves forced to work together to stop the Appleman's schemes.
- Rory is a smart brown-haired boy whose parents got a divorce. His biological dad mysteriously vanished years ago, but Rory receives a package from him on the day of his mother's wedding. The package has an apple-headed doll inside, and it is later revealed that the Appleman himself is Rory's dad.
- The Appleman is the main villain. He lives in his lab, hidden deep within an abandoned refinery full of animals that he treats as his minions. He has a rotten apple for a head and wears a suit with a blue tie. The Appleman's goal is to make others miserable by contaminating things with his virus, which feeds off of negative emotions.
- Jack is Dawn's dad and Rory's stepdad. He works as a sheep shearer.
- Eileen is Rory's mum and Dawn's stepmum who drives a motorcycle. She works as a mail courier.
- Gramps is Dawn's grandfather. He is a veteran of World War II and often helps Dawn and Rory.
- Tori and Tiffany are Dawn's bratty rivals at school. Tori has dirty blonde hair and wears green, while Tiffany has dark brown hair and wears pink.

== Episodes ==
No.	Title
1	"Slobberers"
On the day of their step parents wedding Rory receives a package from his missing father containing an Appleman doll with a nasty surprise inside. Strange little worms that grow larger in the presence of negative emotion. When doll is accidentally taken by the newlyweds the new step siblings must aside their differences to save their parents from the hungry Slobberers.
2	"Croaked"
Rory has not been feeling well since being bitten by the Sloberer and feels that everyone is against him. Things go from bad to worse when helping Gramps to re introduce frogs into the local lake, the wound infects the frogs with the virus.
3	"Curdled"
The interschool race runs into trouble when much of the student population falls ill with a "stomach bug". Rory is certain the Appleman is involved but, the step siblings soon learn that virus tainted milk might be the least of their problems come race day.
4	"Face to Face"
After a series of difficulties Rory decides to explore the old refinery and get to the bottom of the mystery of the Virus and the Appleman; discovering a functional lab and the Appleman waiting for him. Rory narrowly escapes being eaten by a monstrously large Slobberer but, when he brings Dawn and his parents back to show them the "proof" it has all vanished. Or has it?
5	"Carnivorous"
The Appleman creates a new strain of the virus that is capable of contaminating petrol and soon the city is a polluted mess. Dawn and Rory must convince the mayor to invest in a clean air initiative while also making sure Gramps does not fail his driving test.
6	"Fever"
Gold fever has struck Terngabby with people discovering deposits of gold all over the place. It seems to good to be true and heading warnings from Gramps on the danger of Gold fever Dawn and Rory must save their parents and the town from a flood caused by the digging.
7	"Stitched"
A new fashion trend leaves Dawn feeling left our but, gives the Appleman a wicked new idea to spread misery. A new laundromat is raking in the customers but, these "glowing" clean clothes have a bit to much life in them.
8	"Bad Weather"
After a day of bad weather Diane takes the children out for the day but, more than just storm clouds follows them out into the countryside. Can the step siblings hope to stop the strange virus related weather before they are literally blown away?
9	"Composted"
The annual flower festival is coming up and Gramps is determined to win against an old rival. He even receives some help in the form of a new kind of compost but, the kids quickly learn this is no normal grow formula. Now, Rory and Dawn have to save the down from being turned into mulch.
10	"Indigestion"
11	"Shear Terror"
12	"Lemon Twist"
13	"Insectified"
14	"Claws"
15	"Big Mess"
16	"Death Disk!"
17	"Spooked"
18	"Bad Medicine"
19	"Mod Cons"
20	"Collected"
21	"Fit Wits"
22	"Decayed"
23	"Sand Trap"
24	"Feathered"
25	"Double Troubled"
26	"Apple Cored"
