= How Hedley Hopkins Did a Dare =

Novel by Paul Jennings

How Hedley Hopkins Did a Dare...
- Author: Paul Jennings
- Language: English
- Genre: Children's book
- Publisher: Puffin Books
- Publication date: May 2005
- Publication place: Australia
- Media type: Print (Paperback)
- Pages: 224 pages
- ISBN: 0-14-132043-5
- OCLC: 60512542

How Hedley Hopkins Did a Dare, robbed a grave, made a new friend who might not have really been there at all, and while he was at it committed a terrible sin which everyone was doing even though he didn't know it (ISBN 0-14-132043-5) is a children's book written by Australian author Paul Jennings, and published by Puffin Books in May 2005. The story covers a short time in the life of young Hedley Hopkins, an English immigrant to Australia in the 1950s. The book was launched at St. Mary's Cathedral College.

An afterword of the novel states that a good deal of the story is autobiographical in nature.
