= Unmentionable! =

Short story collection by Paul Jennings

- First edition cover
- Author: Paul Jennings
- Genre: Short story collection
- Publisher: Puffin Books
- Publication date: March 1, 1993
- ISBN: 0-670-84734-8
- Preceded by: Unbearable
- Followed by: Undone

Unmentionable! More Amazing Stories is the sixth in a series of collections of short stories by Australian author Paul Jennings, first released in 1991.

== The stories ==
=== Ice Maiden ===
A man hangs out a different ice sculpture at the front of his fish shop every month. But when he makes a maiden sculpture that is a copy of his cousin, one of his friends wants to keep that one. The boy, who is the protagonist, ends up holding the sculpture and kissing it. As his flesh is stuck to the ice sculpture, he tries to scream out words to other people but all he gets are laughs because of his nasal noises. He eventually runs into water and the ice sculpture melts, and the boy is near drowning. However, his hair has actually saved his life because the man saw it floating in the water! The boy wakes up and sees both the man and his cousin looking down at him, only to see what the ice sculpture was based on, the fish man's cousin. Was later adapted as an episode of Round The Twist.

=== Birdman ===
A boy called Sean is entering a flying contest; the wings that he has built are broken and his hang-glider has been stolen by the school bully Jack Buggins (who is also entering the contest), so he relies on a cat-shaped hat that has washed ashore. This hat seems to come to life every now and then; whenever it does, it opens its eyes, and it forces whoever wears it to do whatever it sees someone else doing. The cat-shaped hat sees a bird flying and Sean flies up with it. After, Jack tries on the hat but it sees a pile of faeces and Jack ends up going towards it. Was later adapted as an episode of Round the Twist.

=== Little Squirt ===
A boy called Weesle always gets beaten by his older brother Sam, especially at running and at urinating as high as possible. However, he spends a week training, making him a lot better. Finally, the boy beats his brother at the urinating contest and his brother hits the roof. Was later loosely adapted as an episode of Round The Twist.

=== The Mouth Organ ===
Seven years ago before the events of this story, a bushfire was raging out of control. A group of four young girls — among them the then-six year old protagonist, Nicole — (called the Brownies in the book), led by Mr. and Mrs. Hardbristle were escaping for their lives. When they reached town, no one was in sight and Mrs. Hardbristle sacrificed her life by digging a hole for her husband and the four girls, she suffocated in the smoke. A small magnolia tree was planted in the same hole to honor her sacrifice. Mr. Hardbristle however was depressed, he thought he was a coward and states to Nicole that he won't be happy until the tree blooms, as it tells him his wife has forgiven him.

Seven years have passed and Nicole, now thirteen and using a bucket full of what she thought was fertilizer, accidentally destroys the magnolia tree due to it being blackberry killer instead. Feeling guilty, she now works as a busker to pay up for a new one, costing one thousand dollars. Back in the present, a young man (called Young Ponytail) gives her an enchanted mouth organ that, whenever a song is played on it, causes whoever hears it to act to the lyrics and tells her to "use her own tunes, not other peoples". He tells her he will be back for it, tomorrow at noon, he then leaves.

A tourist bus heading for Sydney pulls up to see the tree. Due to it being dead, they were about to leave when Nicole plays on the mouth organ, but not her own songs. She starts with, "Tom Dooley" by The Kingston Trio, which magically causes the tourists to cry. Next she plays the cancan, it magically causes the tourists to do the dance. The tourists freak out at this and scramble to the bus. Desperately, Nicole tries two more songs, those being "Kookaburra" and "You Can Leave Your Hat On". However, upon realizing the last one was striptease music, she tries to stop playing the song but she couldn't, the song must be played fully. After this, she lets the frightened tourists go, with no money in her hat.

It is here Nicole finally remembers what Young Ponytail told her: "Play your own tune. Not other peoples. You have your own melodies, use them." So she does and several people come out and put money in her hat, including Mr. Windfall the owner of his new rebuilt general store, her teacher Mr. Ralph, a tough Year Seven girl called Sue Rickets and two other tough kids as well. By the time it is over, Nicole has gained eighty-four dollars. Tomorrow comes, and she takes the mouth organ and the money to school, she wonders if she can get the one thousand dollars before 12 o'clock.

At school the mouth organ suddenly trembles in Nicole's hands, she then sees Young Ponytail by the school gate through the school window, she ends up not giving back the mouth organ as greed takes over her mind, declaring the mouth organ to be hers instead. Almost immediately things look different, no one was looking at Nicole anymore and no one asked her to play it, the mouth organ became cursed. As Nicole forces the organ to her mouth, instead of the soothing melodies a horrible noise fills the room and the class groans. The mouth organ turns hostile and twists and turns in Nicole's hands as she blows into it again and it suddenly jams inside her mouth, becoming a real mouth organ!

As Nicole staggers to her feet, a discordant melody fills the air and everyone in the classroom started to come after Nicole, angry at her. Nicole breaks free from the furious students and runs outside. The weather turned to rain and everyone in town chases after her desperate to stop the awful noise of the organ until they corner Nicole at the dead magnolia tree. Nicole then wishes everyone was made of wood, like it. With another screech from the organ, it grants her wish. Everyone suddenly turns into wood in front of Nicole's very eyes! A doctor (Dr. Jensen) comes out, but is turned to wood as well when the first notes hit his ears. Nicole realizes that if she went home, her parents would turn into wood as well. She knows that there is one thing she must do: return the mouth organ to Young Ponytail.

By sacrificing her guitar (and the eighty-four dollars), Nicole gets the man's attention and he plucks the organ out of her mouth, he speaks to her, "It does good for those who do good, and does bad for those who do bad". He gives her the mouth organ and together they walk back to the town, as he tells her to play the song turns the people turned into wood back to normal. She then notices Mr. Hardbristle's face through his window and he comes out and stares at the magnolia tree... the song revived the tree! After Young Ponytail tells her she had one more song to play and Nicole does, a tune of love. When she finally opens her eyes, Mr. Hardbristle and everyone in town is smiling... the magnolia tree is in full bloom.

=== The Velvet Throne ===
Tired of being bossed around by his brother Gobble, who is extremely overweight and spends his whole time lying in bed watching TV and eating junk food, while he just spends the whole day working, a young man called Mr. Simpkin runs away from home; when he stops at a toilet block, he gets locked in. The messages in the graffiti written around the toilet block seem to come true. The effects of the message include: The toilet paper roll in the holder starting to "rock'n'roll," the toilet block getting locked, people gathering around and dancing, a rat being flushed away into the toilet and a velvet throne replacing the toilet. As the toilet block opens, Mr. Simpkin writes a message saying that his brother disappears.

=== Cry Baby ===
A boy called Gavin burns his buttocks after trying to photocopy them, causing him to feel pain whenever he sits down. He then helps his grandfather find a water-holding frog, but they get trapped in the desert without water. Knowing that neither of them can go on any further, Gavin sits down on his burnt bottom and tears rush from his eyes as he feels the unbearable pain. His tears fall onto the ground, causing a ton of frogs to appear on the ground and the grandfather's wish is granted.

=== Ex Poser ===
A boy called Boffin invents a lie detector that works exactly as intended. His friend, David, uses it on the two richest children in his class, hoping to embarrass them.

=== Sloppy Jalopy ===
When a boy called Smacka gets his earrings confiscated at school, he buys a new one. But this one is enchanted; it causes whoever wears it to get rubbish attracted to them. Was later adapted as an episode of Round The Twist.

=== Eyes Knows ===
A boy called Harry's parents are getting divorced, and he can't decide whom to stay with. So he invents a robot man with green eyes and red eyes; whenever he is in a difficult situation, he spins the eyes; both colours cause a different outcome.
