= Uncovered (short story collection) =

Short story collection by Paul Jennings

First edition (publ Puffin Books)

Uncovered is the eighth in a series of collections of short stories by Australian author Paul Jennings. It was first released in 1995.

== The stories ==
=== For Ever ===
A deliberately humorless melancholic drama about a terminally-ill boy called Tim who wants nothing more than to see snow. His non-verbal brother, Richard, is obsessed with toilet paper and honey and says nothing but "Aargh". Could this obsession be linked to his brother's desire?

=== Too Many Rabbits ===
A boy called Philip, whose parents own a bookshop, buys a rabbit from a girl who owns a junk shop. When the rabbit has babies, he keeps them hidden in a secret room but the breeding starts to get out of control. Caring for and hiding hundreds of rabbits soon becomes an impossible task. Was adapted as an episode of Driven Crazy.

=== A Mouthful ===
A girl has a father who loves playing practical jokes on her friends whenever they come for a sleepover. One night, however, he ends up becoming the victim of his own joke.

=== Listen Ear ===
When a boy called Brad looks at and accidentally hides his father's compass and then lies about it, he is forced to stay home and be babysat while the rest of his family goes to the movies. The babysitter doesn't come because her car breaks down, there is a power outage, and Brad ends up being chased by his own reflection. He then tells the reflection that he'll never lie again, and the reflection disappears. Eventually, the family comes home to check if Brad is okay. He tells them his story about the reflection but they don't believe him. They find the compass under his father's desk; the rats actually stole it. Brad then asks if his family believes it but they are suddenly unable to speak. Was adapted as an episode of Driven Crazy.

=== Picked Bones ===
A boy called Terry receives a box from his late uncle. It bears a warning that it must be kept away from his cat – but not because the cat will damage the contents.

=== Just Like Me ===
A 21-year-old man called Ben visits the site of his primary school, which had since been demolished for a shopping centre. When he was 12, he buried a time capsule containing a letter to his girlfriend here. He hopes that someone will uncover that time capsule, as it was supposed to be uncovered nine years from its burial.

=== Ringing Wet ===
A girl called Misty who wets the bed enjoys spying on her neighbour who she believes has buried his wife. When her divorced mother takes her and her brother to an amusement park, they are forced to go home early due to a prank played by her brother. Their father makes a bet that when one of them talks, the other gets 50 dollars.

=== Backward Step ===
A 14-year-old boy called John has the ability to travel through time. He decides to travel to just before his mother was killed and stop her from going on the walk that kills her.

=== Pubic Hare ===
A boy called Peter is the first in his class to grow pubic hair and feels embarrassed about it, so he gains from an old man the ability to move objects with his mind.
