= Bentleigh, Victoria =

Bentleigh
- Suburb
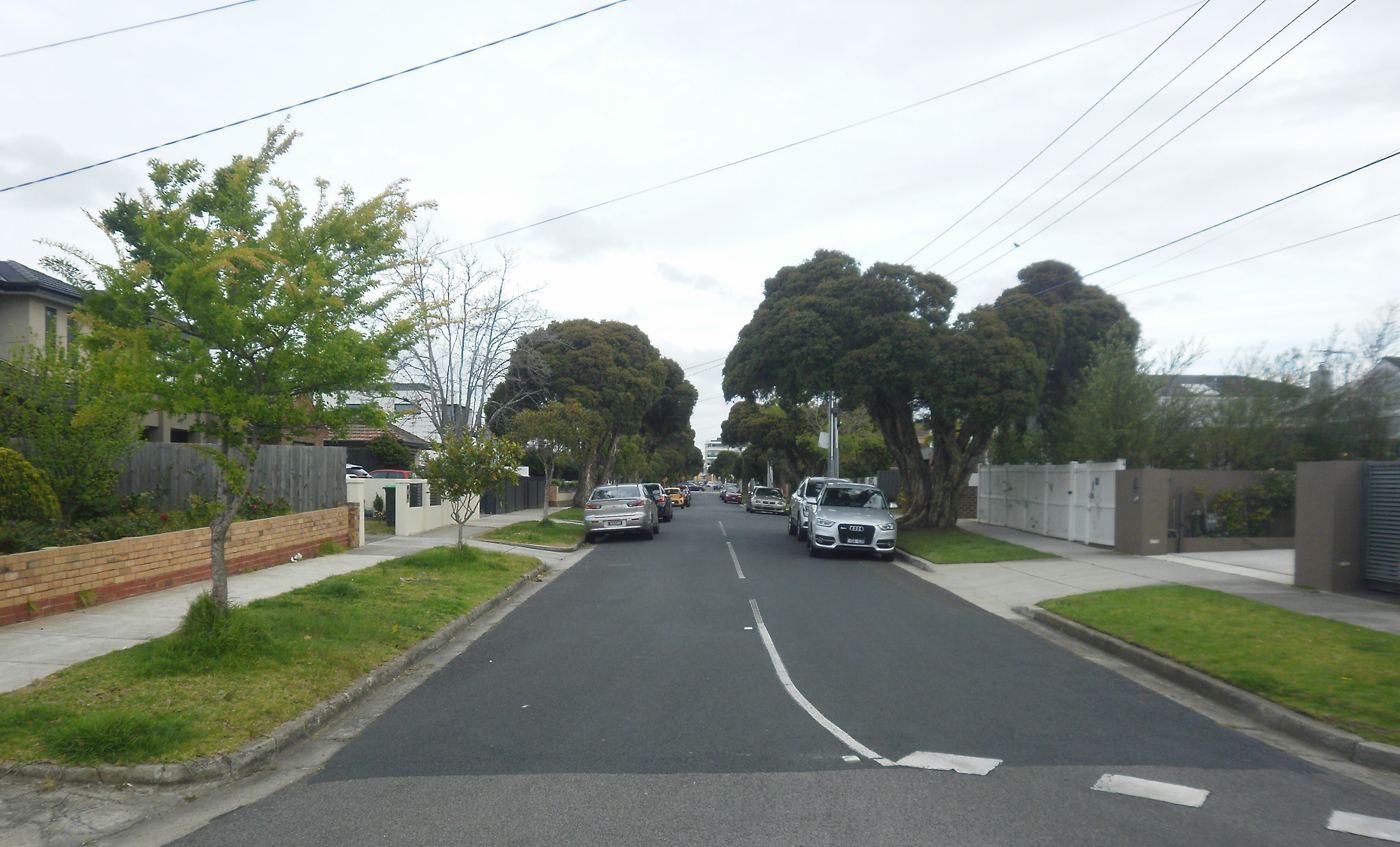
- Gilmour Rd Bentleigh

- Interactive map of Bentleigh
- Coordinates: 37.922°S 145.036°E
- Country: Australia
- State: Victoria
- City: Melbourne
- LGA: City of Glen Eira
- Location: 13 km (8.1 mi) from Melbourne

Government
  - State electorate: Bentleigh
  - Federal division: Goldstein

Area
  - Total: 4.7 km^{2} (1.8 sq mi)
- Elevation: 35 m (115 ft)

Population
  - Total: 17,921 (SAL 2021)
- Postcode: 3204
Suburbs around Bentleigh
Brighton East	McKinnon	Bentleigh East
Brighton East	Bentleigh	Bentleigh East
Hampton East	Moorabbin	Moorabbin

Bentleigh is a suburb in Melbourne, Australia, 13 km south-east of Melbourne's Central Business District, located within the City of Glen Eira local government area. Bentleigh recorded a population of 17,921 at the 2021 census. Within Bentleigh is the unbounded locality of Patterson. Neighbouring suburbs include Bentleigh East, Brighton East, Moorabbin and McKinnon.

== History ==
=== Etymology ===
Formerly known as East Brighton, the area was renamed Bentleigh in 1908 after Victorian Premier, Sir Thomas Bent. This brought the suburb name in line with the name of the local railway station.

=== 19th Century ===
The first Post Office in the area opened on 1 July 1865 as Jasper Road. After the railway arrived it moved to near the station in 1882 and was named Brighton East.

=== 20th Century ===
A Patterson Post Office opened in 1948. In 1961 it was renamed Patterson West when a new Patterson office opened near the railway station.

=== 21st Century ===
Bentleigh is home to Alnutt Park, Victory Park, Halley Park, and Bentleigh Memorial Gardens. The strip shopping centre along Centre Road is the biggest in the area, of over 250 retail businesses, and convenient car parking. The shopping centre has a focus on fresh food, continental delis and cake shops, restaurants and cafes. It has bank branches, fashion and shoe shops, doctors surgeries, dentists and other medical services, an independent bookshop, a newsagent, a toy shop and three supermarkets. It has other services like hairdressers, picture framers, op shops for second-hand retail, and an interior decorator. There is a weekly market next to the train station.

There is also Patterson road shopping centre that has a café, two coffee shops, a Chinese restaurant, an Indian restaurant, a newsagent, a supermarket, a bakery, an organic green grocer, a fishmonger, a travel agent, a pizza shop, a nail technician, a violin maker, a remedial massage centre and three hairdressers.

Its schools are Our Lady of the Sacred Heart College, Bentleigh West Primary School, and St. Paul's Primary School.

Recreational facilities were developed at Halley Park around 1994.

In 2021 the Bentleigh Library closed to be redeveloped.

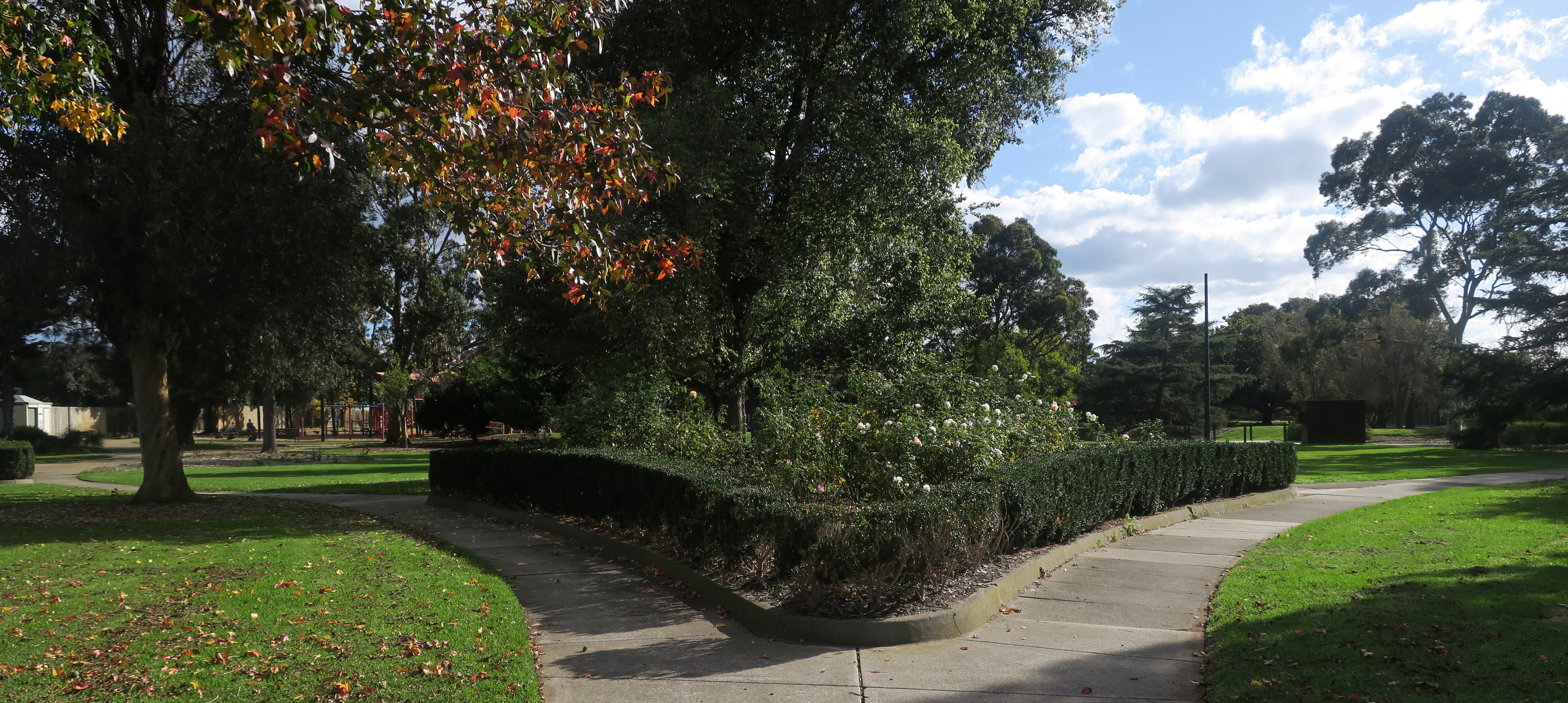
Halley Park Bentleigh

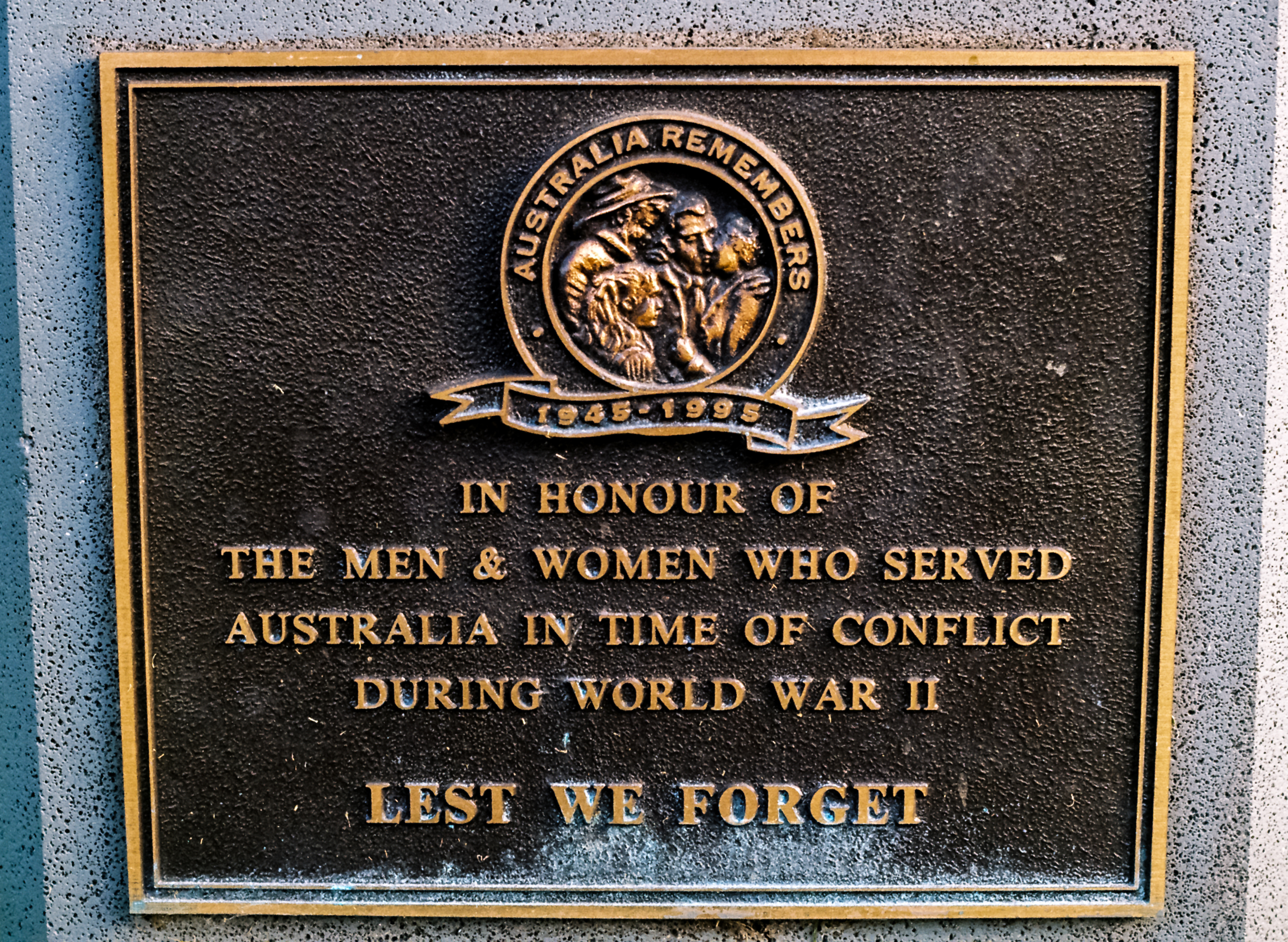
Plaque at Halley Park dedicated to those who served in the second world war

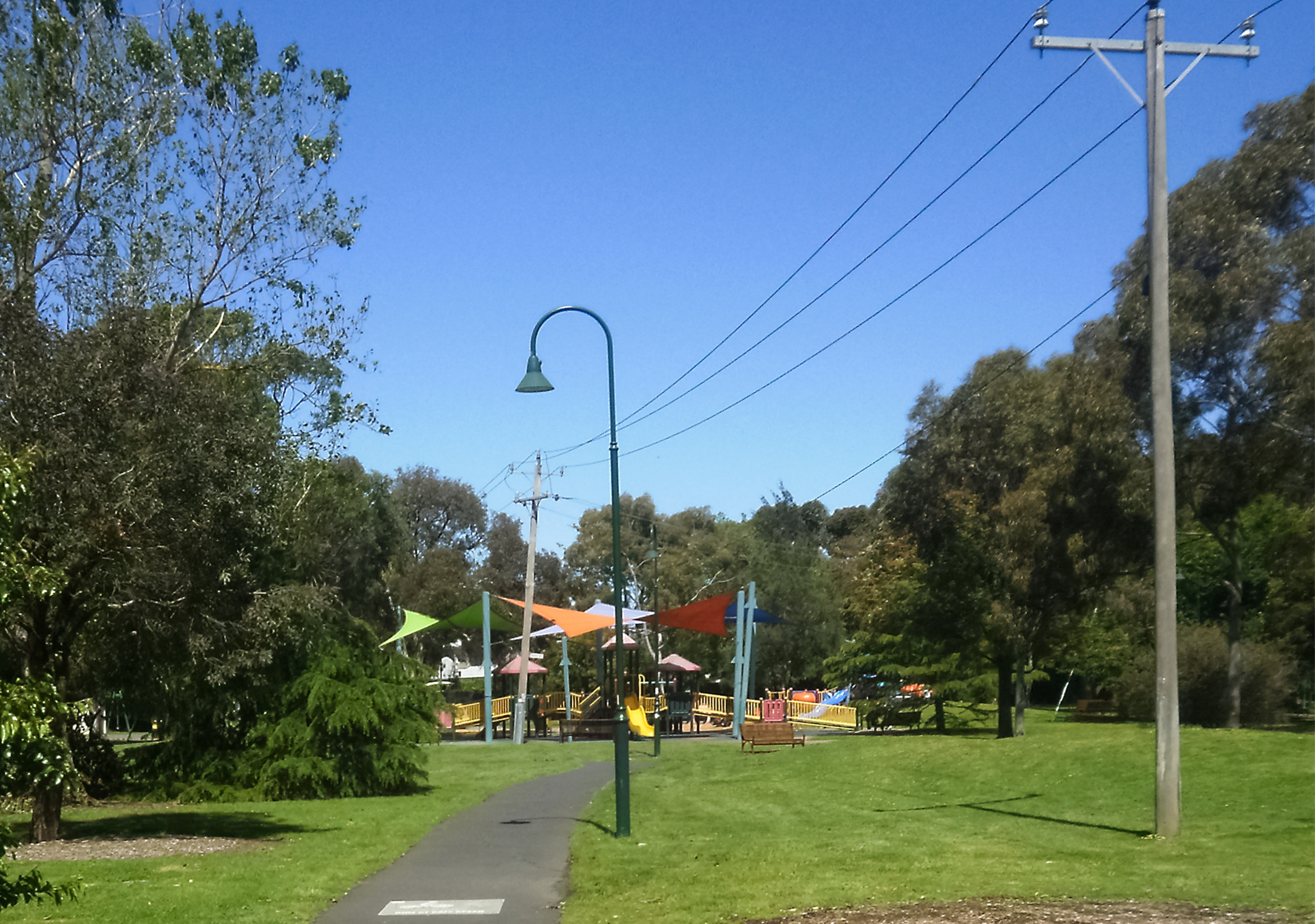
Allnut Park playground

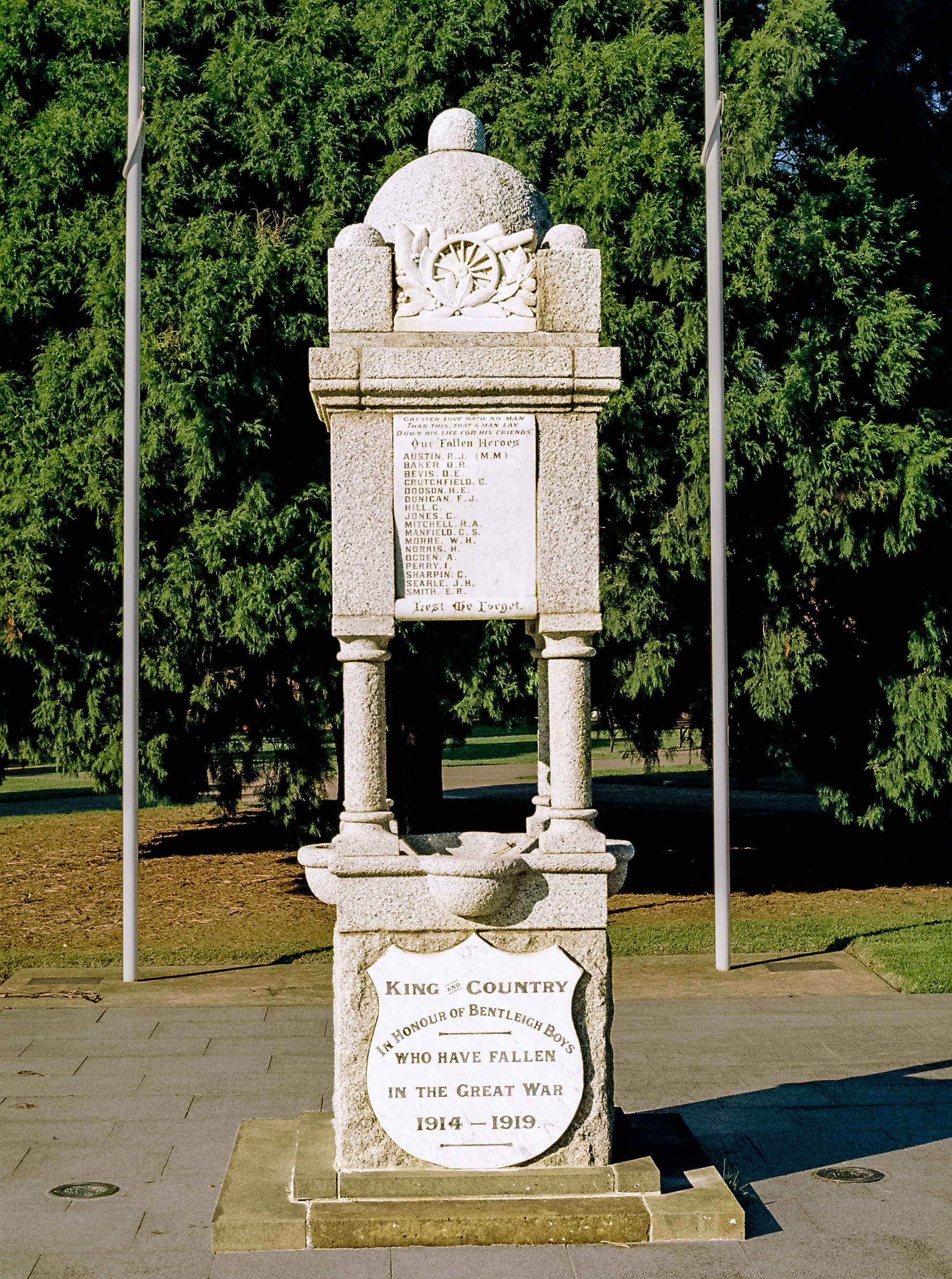
King & Country memorial at Bentleigh Memorial gardens

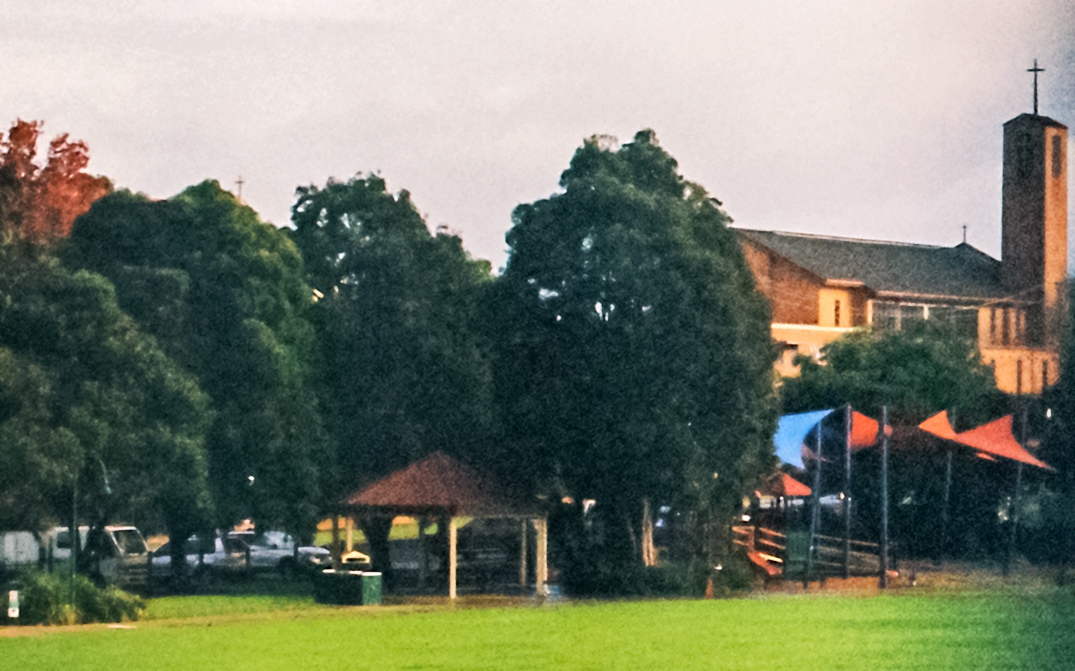
Hodgson reserve

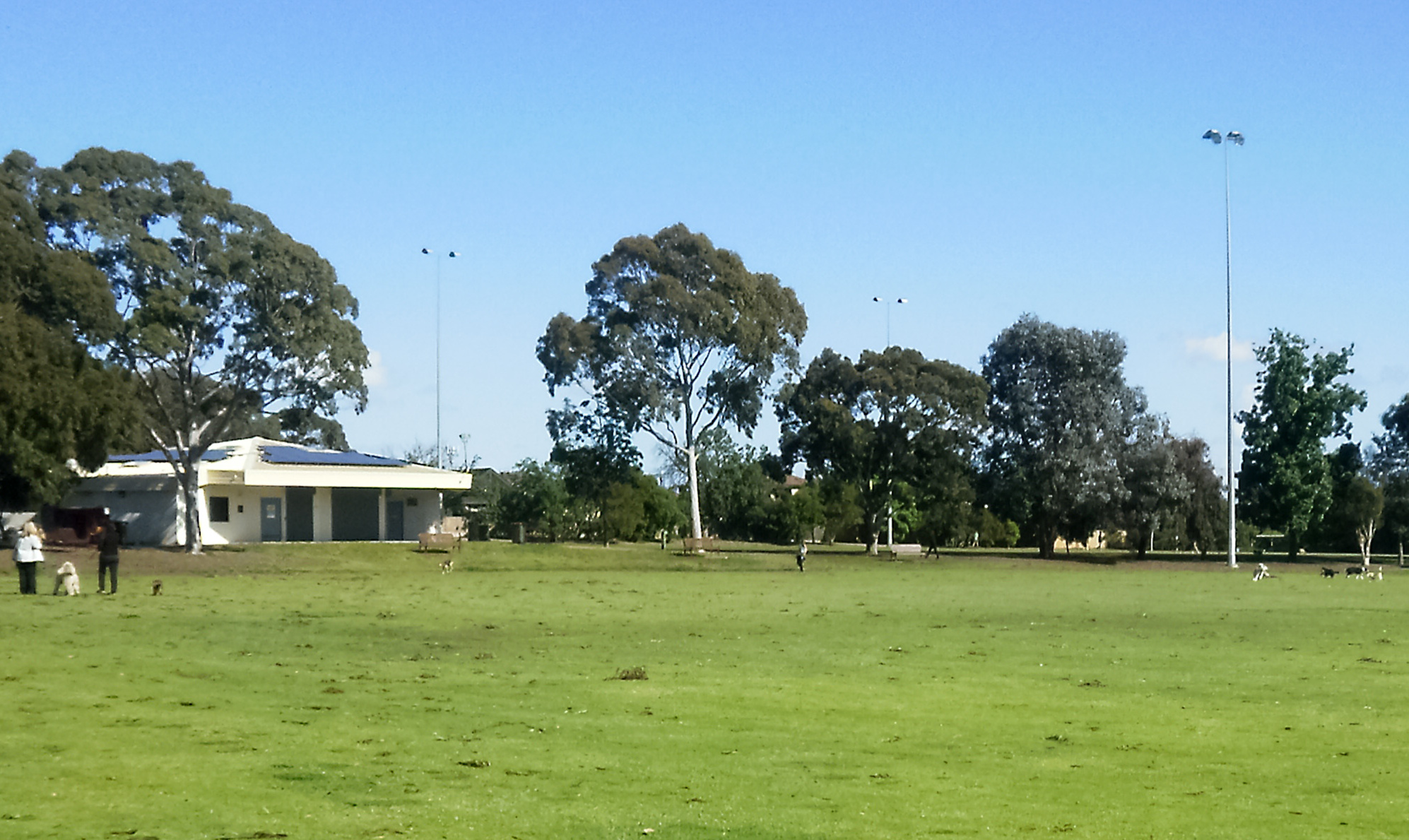
Victory Park

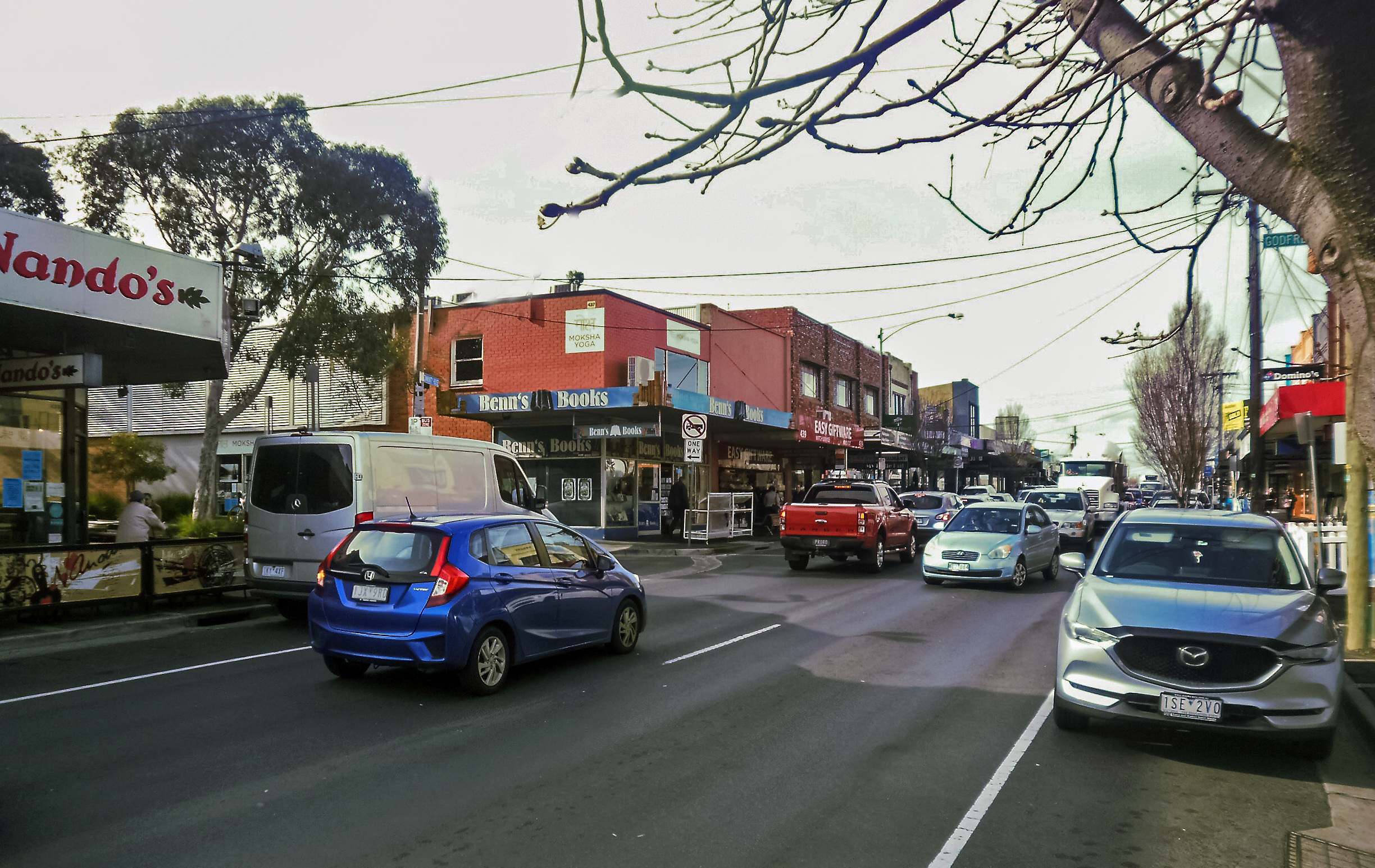
Bentleigh in 2021

== Population ==
In the 2016 Census, there were 16,153 people in Bentleigh. 61.6% of people were born in Australia. The next most common countries of birth were China 5.6%, England 3.4%, India 2.8%, New Zealand 1.9% and Greece 1.5%. 67.2% of people only spoke English at home. Other languages spoken at home included Mandarin 6.4%, Greek 4.2%, Russian 2.8%, Italian 2.1% and Cantonese 1.1%. The most common responses for religion were No Religion 34.4% and Catholic 23.2%.

== Public Transport ==
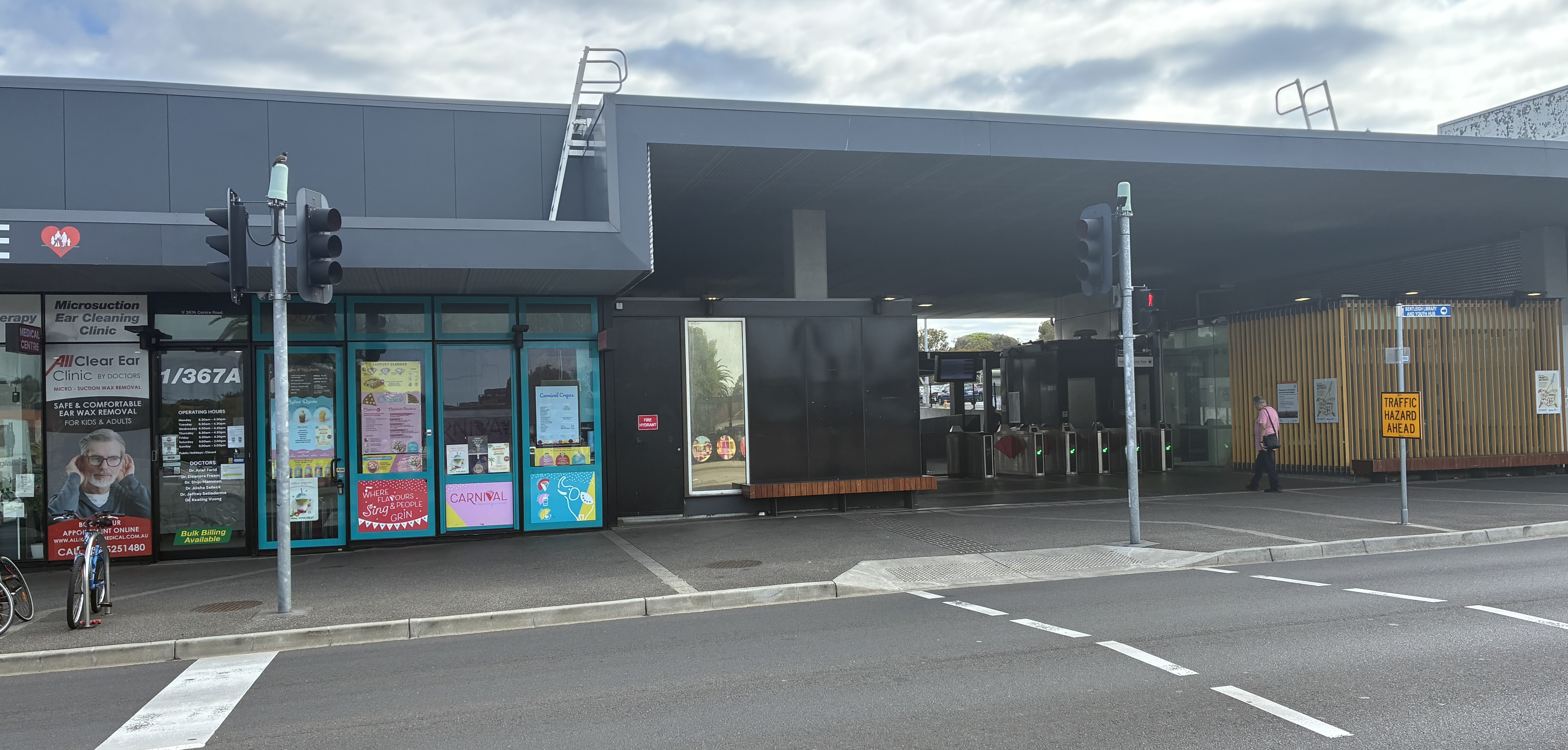
Entrance to Bentleigh station

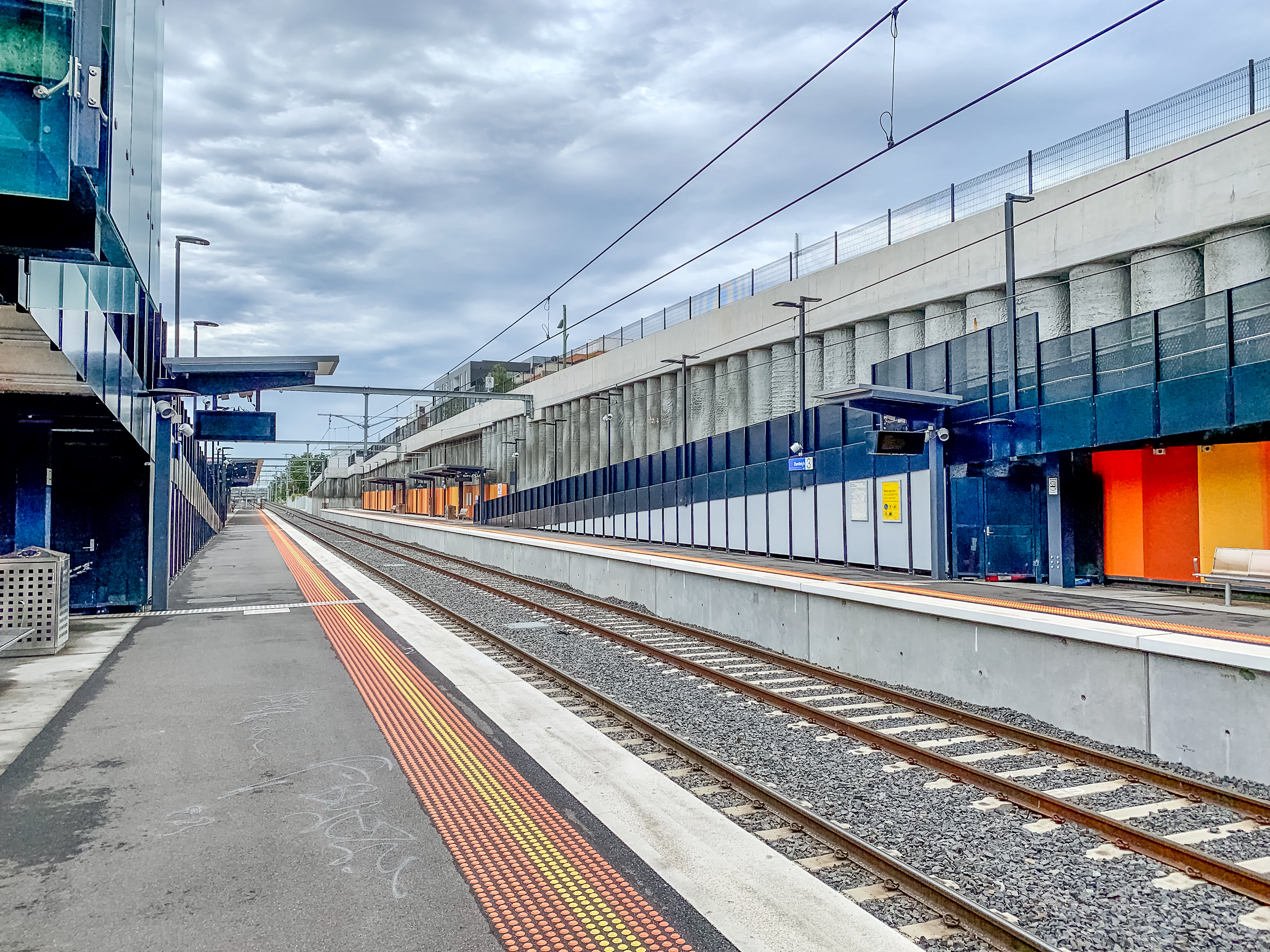
The station platforms

Bentleigh has two railway stations, Bentleigh and Patterson; the former is the end of Zone 1 on the Frankston line.

The level crossing at Bentleigh railway station was upgraded in 2006 at a cost of A$1.2 million and included sirens as well as bells, red man lights, 'Another Train is Coming' lights and latches on the emergency exit. This was after several fatal accidents at the crossing involving pedestrians.

In 2016, the level crossing was upgraded once again as part of the 'Level Crossing Removal Project' initiative. Boom gates no longer occupy the road crossing, as the tracks have been modified to pass underneath. The station has been upgraded to a more modern look.

Bentleigh is also serviced by two bus services. The 703 is a SmartBus service which runs from Middle Brighton to Blackburn through Bentleigh's main shopping strip Centre Road. The 701 service starts from Bentleigh railway station and terminates at Oakleigh railway station. As part of the State Government's $10.5 billion transport plan the 701 service has been upgraded and the operating hours expanded to run seven-days-a-week for the first time.

== Sport ==
The Bentleigh Football Netball Club competes in the Southern Football Netball League (SFNL) and is based at Bentleigh Hodgson Reserve. The Metropolitan Amateur Football Association (MAFA) B Section grand final was played at the Bentleigh football ground in 1930.

== Art and Culture ==
Bentleigh is home to several murals and public art installations. The most notable is a 150 square metre wall of mosaics outside Patterson Station called Stationary Faces, installed by artist Pamela Irving in 2012. Since 2018, the Glen Eira City Council has been commissioning murals near the Centre Road shops.

== Education ==
=== St. Paul's Primary School ===
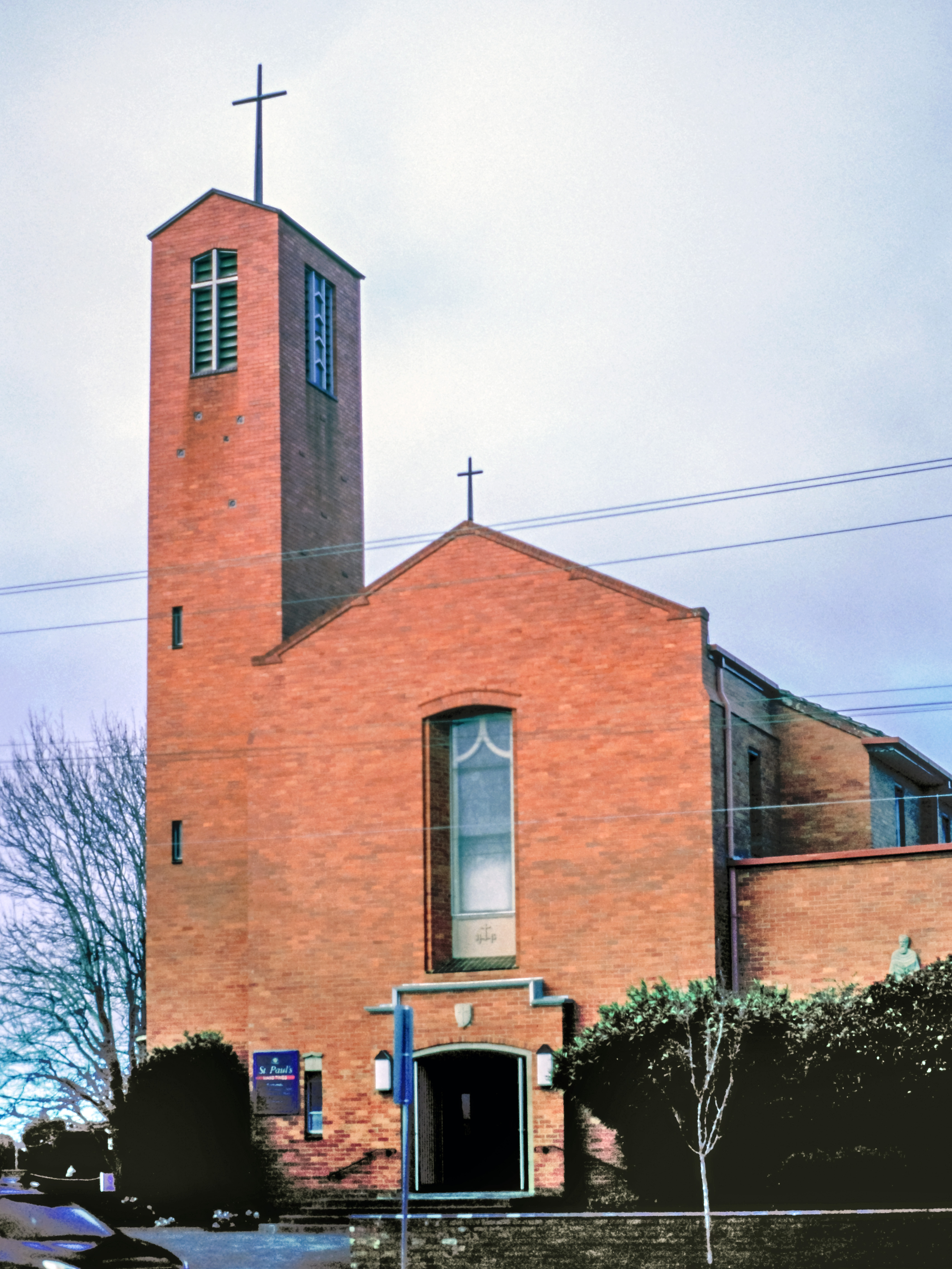
St Paul's Church

St. Paul's Primary School is a Catholic coeducational primary school located in Bentleigh on Jasper Road it is next to a Church with the same name. Established in 1928, it was managed by the Daughters of Our Lady of the Sacred Heart until 1993. Catherine Tammesild is the current principal.

=== Bentleigh West Primary School ===
Bentleigh West is a state coeducational Primary school located on Brewer Road.

=== Our Lady of Sacred Heart College ===
Our Lady of Sacred Heart College (OLSH) is a Catholic girls secondary school located on the corner of Jasper Road and Patterson Road. It was founded in 1938 by the Daughters of Our Lady of the Sacred Heart.

== Notable people ==
- Paul Jennings - children's author, attended Bentleigh West Primary School
- John Romeril - playwright, was educated in Bentleigh West state school
- Nick Staikos - Labour politician, representative of Legislative seat of Bentleigh, and lifelong local
- Jeffrey Walker - film and television director, was educated in the suburb
- David Williamson - playwright, grew up in Bentleigh

== See also ==
- City of Moorabbin – Bentleigh was previously within this former local government area.
- Electoral district of Bentleigh
