= Undone (short story collection) =

1993 collection of short stories by Paul Jennings

First edition (publ. Puffin Books)

Undone is the seventh in a series of collections of short stories by Australian author Paul Jennings. It was first released in 1993 and was the first book in the series not to have any short stories be adapted into an episode of Round the Twist.

== The stories ==
=== Moonies ===
When an illiterate boy called Adam moves to a new school, the school bully has him sign a contract, which he does because he doesn't want anyone to know about his disability. Unfortunately, the contract means he has to moon his principal, ruining his chances of having his painting hung in the art gallery. However, Adam calls him a coward because the bully wouldn't moon and so he ends up doing it, but unfortunately for the bully, he gets into trouble. Was adapted as an episode of Driven Crazy.

=== Noseweed ===
A 95-year-old man enjoys cod-liver oil; his grandson Anthony does not. One day, while trying to breed a new species of apple in honour of his dead wife, Anthony comes over and is given his home-made muesli mixed with cod-liver oil in exchange for money for the movies. But since Anthony is unable to swallow it, the grandfather accompanies him to the movies. However, by leaving the oiled muesli in his mouth for too long, a plant grows on his face, which eventually produces the apple his grandfather wanted to invent. Was adapted as an episode of Driven Crazy.

=== Wake Up to Yourself ===
A boy called Simon is always picked last for sports teams. However, he is about to get a baby brother. While sleeping on the night just before his brother is born, he dreams about a world where he has a mate called Matthew who helps him all the time; Matthew turns out to be a grown-up version of his brother. In the dream he also finds that his mother has died and he lives with his grown up version of his little brother, who is called Matthew but is nicknamed Possum. When Simon's baby brother is born his mother cleans him and admires the new born and says "What a lovely little possum". Possum also has a birth mark the shape of Australia just like the dream version of himself. Was adapted as an episode of Driven Crazy.

=== Thought Full ===
When a boy called Bomber gets a new calf, his father wants to get rid of it, but Bomber likes it so much, so he doesn't want that to happen. He eventually gets a bottle that, when drunk from, allows him to read people's minds.

This is the only Paul Jennings short story that is told from a second-person point of view. This is because Bomber wants the reader to experience how he felt.

=== Clear as Mud ===
When a new boy called Nigel arrives at school, the school bully Eric gives him a very hard time. But when Nigel discovers an unidentified species of beetle, he becomes respected by the school - with the exception of Eric, of course. So when the school tries to show the beetle to the authorities, Eric steals it and expresses a desire to pass it as his own discovery. However, he gets bitten; throughout the following day at school, his skin starts to become see-through. When it spreads to his entire body, he becomes a sideshow; embarrassed, he spends 10 years away from civilization. Eric decides to commemorate the tenth anniversary of his exile by eating the beetle; the beetle bites him again, and he kills it. Afterwards, Eric's skin returns to normal and he decides to return to society, only to discover that everyone else in the world has developed see-through skin. Was adapted as an episode of Driven Crazy and was renamed to "Love Bug."

=== What a Woman ===
Sally is the only girl at a 16-student school gets teased often by all the boys, for the dual reasons of being the only girl and being the worst of all of them in athletic venues. However, when she brings her dead aunt's good-luck charm to school, she suddenly becomes better than them.

=== You Be the Judge ===
A boy and his father live in the middle of the desert; despite the lack of customers at their tiny motel/petrol station, they believe that there will be even more because of a legend of a creature that lives in that area. One night, the boy goes out and spends several days wandering the desert, trying to find this legendary creature. Was adapted as the first episode of Driven Crazy and was renamed to "Wobby Gurgle."
