= Queensland Literary Awards =

Australian literary awards

- Location: Brisbane
- Country: Australia
- First award: 4 September 2012
- Website: www.qldliteraryawards.org.au

The Queensland Literary Awards is an awards program established in 2012 by the Queensland literary community, funded by sponsors and administered by the State Library of Queensland. Like the former Queensland Premier's Literary Awards, the QLAs celebrate and promote outstanding Australian writing. The awards aim to seek out, recognize and nurture great talent in Australian writing. They draw national and international attention to some of our best writers and to Queensland's recognition of outstanding Australian literature and publishing.

These awards have a focus on supporting new writing through the Emerging Queensland Writer – Manuscript Award and Unpublished Indigenous writer – David Unaipon Award. "They give local writers and new writers something to aspire to."

In March 2026 the State Library of Queensland announced that had ended its management. The awards will be organised through the Brisbane Writers Festival in future.

== History ==
The Queensland Literary Awards was established by a not-for-profit association of passionate Queensland volunteers and advocates for literature, in response to Queensland Premier Campbell Newman disestablishing the Queensland Premier's Literary Awards in 2012.

In 2012 and 2013 the program was run by a volunteer workforce. Following consultation with the QLA Inc. governing committee, 2014 saw the management of the QLA transition to State Library of Queensland (SLQ). While SLQ took on a leadership role in delivering the program, the aim was to continue to build on the existing collaborative model where the community and writing sector partners are key stakeholders.

The original Premier's awards were established by Peter Beattie, the then Premier of Queensland in 1998 and first awarded in 1999.

== Award categories ==
There are currently twelve award categories including:

- Queensland Premier's Award for a work of State Significance
- Queensland Premier's Young Publishers and Writers Award
- Queensland Writers Fellowships
- The University of Queensland Fiction Book Award
- The University of Queensland Non-Fiction Book Award
- Young Adult Book Award
- Children's Book Award
- University of Southern Queensland Steele Rudd Award for a Short Story Collection
- Judith Wright Calanthe Award for a Poetry Collection
- David Unaipon Award for an Emerging Aboriginal and/or Torres Strait Writer
- Glendower Award for an Emerging Queensland Writer
- The Courier-Mail People's Choice Queensland Book of the Year

== Judging ==
The awards are judged by independent panels of writers, critics, journalists, academics and booksellers. They are presented to works the judges determine possess the highest literary merit.

== Winners ==
=== 2026 ===
The shortlist was announced in July 2026. Winners were announced on 8 October 2026.

List of 2026 Queensland Literary Awards Recipients
Category	Author	Title	Result
Queensland Premier's Award for a Work of State Significance	Lenora Thaker	The Pearl of Tagai Town	Winner
Queensland Premier's Award for a Work of State Significance	Debra Dank	Terraglossia	Finalist
Queensland Premier's Award for a Work of State Significance	Melissa Lucashenko	Not Quite White in the Head	Finalist
Queensland Premier's Award for a Work of State Significance	Henry Reynolds	Looking from the North	Finalist
Queensland Premier's Award for a Work of State Significance	Juliet Rieden	Quentin Bryce	Finalist
The University of Queensland Non-Fiction Book Award	Micaela Sahhar	Find Me at the Jaffa Gate	Winner
The University of Queensland Non-Fiction Book Award	Debra Dank	Terraglossia	Finalist
The University of Queensland Non-Fiction Book Award	Richard King	Brave New Wild	Finalist
The University of Queensland Non-Fiction Book Award	Erin Vincent	Fourteen Ways of Looking	Finalist
The University of Queensland Non-Fiction Book Award	Kate Wild	The Red House	Finalist
The University of Queensland Fiction Book Award	Claire Thomas	On Not Climbing Mountains	Winner
The University of Queensland Fiction Book Award	Johanna Bell	Department of the Vanishing	Finalist
The University of Queensland Fiction Book Award	Rhett Davis	Arborescence	Finalist
The University of Queensland Fiction Book Award	Gail Jones	The Name of the Sister	Finalist
The University of Queensland Fiction Book Award	Sita Walker	In A Common Hour	Finalist
Young Adult Book Award	Julianne Negri	The Belly of a Wolf	Winner
Young Adult Book Award	Karen Comer	Once Upon Tomorrow	Finalist
Young Adult Book Award	Jason Gent	This Season's Draft	Finalist
Young Adult Book Award	Gary Lonesborough	Good Young Men	Finalist
Young Adult Book Award	Anna Whateley	Tearing Myself Together	Finalist
Children's Book Award	Zeno Sworder	Once I Was a Giant	Winner
Children's Book Award	Leesa Allinson	One Koala, One Hundred Trees	Finalist
Children's Book Award	Seetha Dodd & Peter Cheong	Myra in the Middle	Finalist
Children's Book Award	Kate Gordon	The Midlands	Finalist
Children's Book Award	Ellen van Neerven	Ruby's Web	Finalist
Judith Wright Calanthe Award for a Poetry Collection	Eunice Andrada	KONTRA	Winner
Judith Wright Calanthe Award for a Poetry Collection	Zarah Butcher-McGunnigle	Leaves Fall Off to Create Drama	Finalist
Judith Wright Calanthe Award for a Poetry Collection	Liam Ferney	Shark of Messina	Finalist
Judith Wright Calanthe Award for a Poetry Collection	James Lucas	Jack Mundey in Red Square	Finalist
Judith Wright Calanthe Award for a Poetry Collection	Luke Patterson	A Savage Turn	Finalist
Steele Rudd Award for a Short Story Collection	Helena Pantsis	Mother Salad	Winner
Steele Rudd Award for a Short Story Collection	Alex Cothren	Playing Nice Was Getting Me Nowhere	Finalist
Steele Rudd Award for a Short Story Collection	Murray Middleton	U Want It Darker	Finalist
Steele Rudd Award for a Short Story Collection	Lucy Nelson	Wait Here	Finalist
The Courier-Mail People's Choice Queensland Book of the Year Award	Sita Walker	In a Common Hour	Winner
The Courier-Mail People's Choice Queensland Book of the Year Award	Heather Anderson	People Powered Radio	Finalist
The Courier-Mail People's Choice Queensland Book of the Year Award	Kimberley Allsopp	Rise and Shine	Finalist
The Courier-Mail People's Choice Queensland Book of the Year Award	Kimberley Freeman	The Secret Year of Zara Holt	Finalist
The Courier-Mail People's Choice Queensland Book of the Year Award	Kathleen Jennings	Honeyeater	Finalist
The Courier-Mail People's Choice Queensland Book of the Year Award	Astrid Jorgensen	Average At Best	Finalist
The Courier-Mail People's Choice Queensland Book of the Year Award	Grantlee Kieza	Mary Penfold	Finalist
The Courier-Mail People's Choice Queensland Book of the Year Award	Ian Kemish	Two Islands	Finalist
The Courier-Mail People's Choice Queensland Book of the Year Award	Angie Faye Martin	Melaleuca	Finalist
The Courier-Mail People's Choice Queensland Book of the Year Award	Frances Whiting	The Nocturnals	Finalist
David Unaipon Award for an Emerging Aboriginal and/or Torres Strait Islander Writer	Lukas Williams	"When the Circle Speaks"	Winner
David Unaipon Award for an Emerging Aboriginal and/or Torres Strait Islander Writer	Rick Slager	"The South Paddock"	Finalist
Manuscript Award for Emerging Queensland Author	Helen Crampton	" The Passion Hunters "	Winner
Manuscript Award for Emerging Queensland Author	Jing Cram	"Clean"	Finalist
Manuscript Award for Emerging Queensland Author	Sonya Gellert	"Best Served Cold"	Finalist
Manuscript Award for Emerging Queensland Author	Karen Kenny	"Crew Cut"	Finalist
Manuscript Award for Emerging Queensland Author	Kate Mayne	"The Cult"	Finalist
Queensland Premier's Young Publishers and Writers Award	Svetlana Sterlin		Winner
Queensland Premier's Young Publishers and Writers Award	Emily Lighezzolo		Finalist
Queensland Premier's Young Publishers and Writers Award	Waverley Stanley Jr.		Finalist
Queensland Premier's Young Publishers and Writers Award	Grace Wilson		Finalist
Queensland Premier's Regional Writer and Publisher Award	Abi Stephenson		Winner
Queensland Premier's Regional Writer and Publisher Award	Ian McIntosh		Finalist
Queensland Premier's Regional Writer and Publisher Award	Terry Phillips		Finalist

=== 2025 ===
The shortlist was announced in early September 2025. Winners were announced on 26 September 2025.

List of 2025 Queensland Literary Awards Recipients
Category	Author	Title	Result
Queensland Premier's Award for a Work of State Significance	Amy McQuire	Black Witness	Winner
Queensland Premier's Award for a Work of State Significance	Lech Blaine	Australian Gospel: A Family Saga	Finalist
Queensland Premier's Award for a Work of State Significance	Simon Cleary	Everything is Water	Finalist
Queensland Premier's Award for a Work of State Significance	Cheryl Leavy & Christopher Bassi	Yanga Mother	Finalist
Queensland Premier's Award for a Work of State Significance	Darren Rix & Craig Cormick	Warra Warra Wai	Finalist
The University of Queensland Non-Fiction Book Award	Clare Wright	Näku Dhäruk: The Bark Petitions	Winner
The University of Queensland Non-Fiction Book Award	Santilla Chingaipe	Black Convicts	Finalist
The University of Queensland Non-Fiction Book Award	Helen Garner	The Season	Finalist
The University of Queensland Non-Fiction Book Award	Stan Grant	Murriyang: Song of time	Finalist
The University of Queensland Non-Fiction Book Award	Darren Rix & Craig Cormick	Warra Warra Wai	Finalist
The University of Queensland Fiction Book Award	Emily Maguire	Rapture	Winner
The University of Queensland Fiction Book Award	Laura Elvery	Nightingale	Finalist
The University of Queensland Fiction Book Award	Charlotte McConaghy	Wild Dark Shore	Finalist
The University of Queensland Fiction Book Award	Josephine Rowe	Little World	Finalist
The University of Queensland Fiction Book Award	Gretchen Shirm	Out of the Woods	Finalist
Young Adult Book Award	C. G. Drews	Don't Let the Forest In	Winner
Young Adult Book Award	Lauren Draper	Return to Sender	Finalist
Young Adult Book Award	Kate Gordon	My Brother, Finch	Finalist
Young Adult Book Award	Erin Gough	Into the Mouth of the Wolf	Finalist
Young Adult Book Award	Ambelin Kwaymullina	Liar's Test	Finalist
Children's Book Award	Sandy Bigna	Little Bones	Winner
Children's Book Award	Sophie Beer	Thunderhead	Finalist
Children's Book Award	Aaron Fa'Aoso & Michelle Scott Tucker	Spirit of the Crocodile	Finalist
Children's Book Award	Katrina Nannestad	All the Beautiful Things	Finalist
Children's Book Award	Shivaun Plozza	Summer of Shipwrecks	Finalist
Judith Wright Calanthe Award for a Poetry Collection	Chris Andrews	The Oblong Plot	Winner
Judith Wright Calanthe Award for a Poetry Collection	Judith Beveridge	Tintinnabulum	Finalist
Judith Wright Calanthe Award for a Poetry Collection	Luke Johnson	Kangaroo Unbound	Finalist
Judith Wright Calanthe Award for a Poetry Collection	Isabella G. Mead	The Infant Vine	Finalist
Judith Wright Calanthe Award for a Poetry Collection	Alan Wearne	Mixed Business	Finalist
The Courier-Mail People's Choice Queensland Book of the Year Award	Laura Elvery	Nightingale	Winner
The Courier-Mail People's Choice Queensland Book of the Year Award	Santilla Chingaipe	Black Convicts	Finalist
The Courier-Mail People's Choice Queensland Book of the Year Award	Simon Cleary	Everything is Water	Finalist
The Courier-Mail People's Choice Queensland Book of the Year Award	Anita Heiss	Dirrayawadha	Finalist
The Courier-Mail People's Choice Queensland Book of the Year Award	Grantlee Kieza	Annette Kellerman, Australian Mermaid	Finalist
The Courier-Mail People's Choice Queensland Book of the Year Award	Tess Merlin	Red Dirt Blue Lights	Finalist
The Courier-Mail People's Choice Queensland Book of the Year Award	Steve MinOn	First Name Second Name	Finalist
The Courier-Mail People's Choice Queensland Book of the Year Award	Gari Tudor-Smith, Paul Williams & Felicity Meakins	Bina: First Nations Languages, Old and New	Finalist
David Unaipon Award for an Emerging Aboriginal and/or Torres Strait Islander Writer	E. S. Crismani	"Finding Billy Brown"	Winner
David Unaipon Award for an Emerging Aboriginal and/or Torres Strait Islander Writer	Vika Mana	"Eskos"	Finalist
David Unaipon Award for an Emerging Aboriginal and/or Torres Strait Islander Writer	B. S. Windon	"Neurodiverging Into [He]ARTS"	Finalist
Queensland Writers Fellowships	Vuong Pham	"Reborn"	Winner
Queensland Writers Fellowships	Mykaela Saunders	"Dear Uncle"	Winner
Glendower Award for Emerging Queensland Author	Gillian Hagenus	"Commonplaces"	Winner
Glendower Award for Emerging Queensland Author	Bronte Coates	"The Curse"	Finalist
Glendower Award for Emerging Queensland Author	Mindy Gill	"Easy Living"	Finalist
Glendower Award for Emerging Queensland Author	Karen Lee	"The Burning Season"	Finalist
Glendower Award for Emerging Queensland Author	Dani Ringrose	"The Lyrebirds"	Finalist
Queensland Premier’s Young Publishers and Writers Award	Alex Philp		Winner
Queensland Premier’s Young Publishers and Writers Award	Sean West		Winner
Queensland Premier’s Young Publishers and Writers Award	Olivia J. Bennett		Finalist
Queensland Premier’s Young Publishers and Writers Award	Svetlana Sterlin		Finalist

=== 2024 ===
The shortlist was announced on 1 August 2024. Winners were announced on 5 September 2024.

List of 2024 Queensland Literary Awards Recipients
Category	Author	Title	Result
Queensland Premier's Award for a Work of State Significance	Melissa Lucashenko	Edenglassie	Winner
Queensland Premier's Award for a Work of State Significance	Graham Akhurst	Borderland	Finalist
Queensland Premier's Award for a Work of State Significance	Kris Kneen	Fat Girl Dancing	Finalist
Queensland Premier's Award for a Work of State Significance	J. M. Tolcher	Poof	Finalist
Queensland Premier's Award for a Work of State Significance	Ellen van Neerven	Personal Score: Sport, Culture, Identity	Finalist
The University of Queensland Non-Fiction Book Award	Abbas El-Zein	Bullet, Paper, Rock: A Memoir of Words and Wars	Winner
The University of Queensland Non-Fiction Book Award	James Bradley	Deep Water: The World In the Ocean	Finalist
The University of Queensland Non-Fiction Book Award	Bonny Cassidy	Monument	Finalist
The University of Queensland Non-Fiction Book Award	Antony Loewenstein	The Palestine Laboratory: How Israel Exports the Technology of Occupation Around the World	Finalist
The University of Queensland Non-Fiction Book Award	Ellen van Neerven	Personal Score: Sport, Culture, Identity	Finalist
The University of Queensland Fiction Book Award	Sharlene Allsopp	The Great Undoing	Winner
The University of Queensland Fiction Book Award	Katherine Brabon	Body Friend	Finalist
The University of Queensland Fiction Book Award	Yumna Kassab	Politica	Finalist
The University of Queensland Fiction Book Award	Siang Lu	Ghost Cities	Finalist
The University of Queensland Fiction Book Award	Melissa Lucashenko	Edenglassie	Finalist
Young Adult Book Award	sydney khoo	The Spider and Her Demons	Winner
Young Adult Book Award	Graham Akhurst	Borderland	Finalist
Young Adult Book Award	Barry Jonsberg	Smoke & Mirrors	Finalist
Young Adult Book Award	Will Kostakis	We Could Be Something	Finalist
Young Adult Book Award	Ann Liang	I Hope This Doesn't Find You	Finalist
Children's Book Award	Karen Comer	Sunshine on Vinegar Street	Winner
Children's Book Award	Trace Balla	Leaf-light	Finalist
Children's Book Award	Peter Carnavas	Leo and Ralph	Finalist
Children's Book Award	Jaclyn Moriarty, illustrated by Kelly Canby	The Impossible Secret of Lillian Velvet	Finalist
Children's Book Award	Blake Nuto	When You're a Boy	Finalist
Steele Rudd Award for a Short Story Collection	John Morrissey	Firelight	Winner
Steele Rudd Award for a Short Story Collection	David Cohen	The Terrible Event	Finalist
Steele Rudd Award for a Short Story Collection	Magdalena McGuire	Born For You	Finalist
Steele Rudd Award for a Short Story Collection	Laura Jean McKay	Gunflower	Finalist
Steele Rudd Award for a Short Story Collection	John Richards	The Gorgon Flower	Finalist
Judith Wright Calanthe Award for a Poetry Collection	L. K. Holt	Three Books	Winner
Judith Wright Calanthe Award for a Poetry Collection	Manisha Anjali	Naag Mountain	Finalist
Judith Wright Calanthe Award for a Poetry Collection	Jarad Bruinstroop	Reliefs	Finalist
Judith Wright Calanthe Award for a Poetry Collection	Mitchell Welch	Vehicular Man	Finalist
Judith Wright Calanthe Award for a Poetry Collection	Petra White	That Galloping Horse	Finalist
The Courier-Mail People's Choice Queensland Book of the Year Award	Carly-Jay Metcalfe	Breath	Winner
The Courier-Mail People's Choice Queensland Book of the Year Award	Sharlene Allsopp	The Great Undoing	Finalist
The Courier-Mail People's Choice Queensland Book of the Year Award	Melissa Ashley	The Naturalist of Amsterdam	Finalist
The Courier-Mail People's Choice Queensland Book of the Year Award	Wendy Cooper	The Bird Art of William T. Cooper	Finalist
The Courier-Mail People's Choice Queensland Book of the Year Award	Anna Jacobson	How to Knit a Human	Finalist
The Courier-Mail People's Choice Queensland Book of the Year Award	Grantlee Kieza	The Remarkable Mrs Reibey	Finalist
The Courier-Mail People's Choice Queensland Book of the Year Award	Siang Lu	Ghost Cities	Finalist
The Courier-Mail People's Choice Queensland Book of the Year Award	Anna McGahan	Immaculate	Finalist
David Unaipon Award for an Emerging Aboriginal and/or Torres Strait Islander Writer	Dominic Guerrera	Native Rage	Winner
David Unaipon Award for an Emerging Aboriginal and/or Torres Strait Islander Writer	Chella Goldwin	Politics	Finalist
David Unaipon Award for an Emerging Aboriginal and/or Torres Strait Islander Writer	Lulu Houdini	River Page	Finalist
Queensland Writers Fellowships	Jarad Bruinstroop	"For the Duration"	Winner
Queensland Writers Fellowships	Sarah Kanake	"Lazarus; or, The Whale"	Winner
Queensland Writers Fellowships	Cheryl Leavy	"Mudhunda—Song Country"	Winner
Glendower Award for Emerging Queensland Author	Emily Lighezzolo	Life Drawing	Winner
Glendower Award for Emerging Queensland Author	Myles McGuire	Tender Age	Finalist
Glendower Award for Emerging Queensland Author	Nicky Peelgrane	EndGain	Finalist
Glendower Award for Emerging Queensland Author	Lillian Telford	Lovesick	Finalist
Queensland Premier’s Young Publishers and Writers Award	Gavin Yuan Gao		Winner
Queensland Premier’s Young Publishers and Writers Award	Myles McGuire		Winner
Queensland Premier’s Young Publishers and Writers Award	Wallea Eaglehawk		Finalist
Queensland Premier’s Young Publishers and Writers Award	Alex Philip		Finalist
Queensland Premier’s Young Publishers and Writers Award	Sean West		Finalist

=== 2023 ===
The winners were announced on 6 September 2023.

List of 2023 Queensland Literary Awards Recipients
Category	Author	Title	Result
Queensland Premier's Award for a Work of State Significance	Sarah Holland-Batt	The Jaguar	Winner
Queensland Premier's Award for a Work of State Significance	Debra Dank	We Come With This Place	Finalist
Queensland Premier's Award for a Work of State Significance	Kate Foster	The Bravest Word	Finalist
Queensland Premier's Award for a Work of State Significance	Sally Piper	Bone Memories	Finalist
Queensland Premier's Award for a Work of State Significance	Alexis Wright	Praiseworthy	Finalist
The Courier-Mail People's Choice Queensland Book of the Year Award	Sita Walker	The God of No Good	Winner
The Courier-Mail People's Choice Queensland Book of the Year Award	Debra Dank	We Come With This Place	Finalist
The Courier-Mail People's Choice Queensland Book of the Year Award	Veronica Lando	The Whispering	Finalist
The Courier-Mail People's Choice Queensland Book of the Year Award	Kate Morton	Homecoming	Finalist
The Courier-Mail People's Choice Queensland Book of the Year Award	Sally Piper	Bone Memories	Finalist
The Courier-Mail People's Choice Queensland Book of the Year Award	Holly Ringland	The Seven Skins of Esther Wilding	Finalist
The Courier-Mail People's Choice Queensland Book of the Year Award	Marion Stell	The Bodyline Fix	Finalist
The Courier-Mail People's Choice Queensland Book of the Year Award	Penny van Oosterzee	Cloud Land	Finalist
The University of Queensland Fiction Book Award	Alexis Wright	Praiseworthy	Winner
The University of Queensland Fiction Book Award	Geraldine Brooks	Horse	Finalist
The University of Queensland Fiction Book Award	Fiona McFarlane	The Sun Walks Down	Finalist
The University of Queensland Fiction Book Award	Michael Meehan	An Ungrateful Instrument	Finalist
The University of Queensland Fiction Book Award	Shaun Prescott	Bon and Lesley	Finalist
The University of Queensland Non-Fiction Book Award	Debra Dank	We Come With This Place	Winner
The University of Queensland Non-Fiction Book Award	Joëlle Gergis	Humanity’s Moment	Finalist
The University of Queensland Non-Fiction Book Award	Louisa Lim	Indelible City	Finalist
The University of Queensland Non-Fiction Book Award	Anna Spargo-Ryan	A Kind of Magic	Finalist
The University of Queensland Non-Fiction Book Award	Sam Wallman	Our Members Be Unlimited	Finalist
Judith Wright Calanthe Award for a Poetry Collection	Lionel Fogarty	Harvest Lingo	Winner
Judith Wright Calanthe Award for a Poetry Collection	Michael Farrell	Googlecholia	Finalist
Judith Wright Calanthe Award for a Poetry Collection	Autumn Royal	The Drama Student	Finalist
Judith Wright Calanthe Award for a Poetry Collection	Simon Tedeschi	Fugitive	Finalist
Judith Wright Calanthe Award for a Poetry Collection	Rae White	Exactly As I Am	Finalist
University of Southern Queensland Steele Rudd Award for a Short Story Collection	Katerina Gibson	Women I Know	Winner
University of Southern Queensland Steele Rudd Award for a Short Story Collection	Paul Dalla Rosa	An Exciting and Vivid Inner Life	Finalist
University of Southern Queensland Steele Rudd Award for a Short Story Collection	Else Fitzgerald	Everything Feels Like the End of the World	Finalist
University of Southern Queensland Steele Rudd Award for a Short Story Collection	Chris Flynn	Here Be Leviathans	Finalist
Griffith University Young Adult Book Award	Biffy James	Completely Normal (and Other Lies)	Winner
Griffith University Young Adult Book Award	Helena Fox	The Quiet and the Loud	Finalist
Griffith University Young Adult Book Award	Nina Kenwood	Unnecessary Drama	Finalist
Griffith University Young Adult Book Award	Ann Liang	If You Could See the Sun	Finalist
Griffith University Young Adult Book Award	Jared Thomas	My Spare Heart	Finalist
Children's Book Award	Katrina Nannestad	Waiting for the Storks	Winner
Children's Book Award	Zana Fraillon	The Way of Dog	Finalist
Children's Book Award	Bob Graham	Jigsaw: A Puzzle in the Post	Finalist
Children's Book Award	Hakea Hustler, Carl Merrison & Samantha Campbell	My Deadly Boots	Finalist
Children's Book Award	Gabrielle Wang	Zadie Ma and the Dog Who Chased the Moon	Finalist
Queensland Premier's Young Publishers and Writers Award	Jasmin McGaughey		Winner
Queensland Premier's Young Publishers and Writers Award	Jonathan O'Brien		Winner
Queensland Premier's Young Publishers and Writers Award	Myles McGuire		Finalist
Queensland Premier's Young Publishers and Writers Award	Alex Philp		Finalist
Queensland Premier's Young Publishers and Writers Award	Sean West		Finalist
Queensland Writers Fellowships	Al Campbell	Door 64	Winner
Queensland Writers Fellowships	B. R. Dionysius	The Eromanga Sea	Winner
Queensland Writers Fellowships	Melanie Saward	The Next Chapter	Winner
Glendower Award for Emerging Queensland Author	Steve MinOn	First Name, Second Name	Winner
Glendower Award for Emerging Queensland Author	Fernanda Dahlstrom	The See-Saw	Finalist
Glendower Award for Emerging Queensland Author	Sandra Minke	Treasure	Finalist
Glendower Award for Emerging Queensland Author	Margot Shave	Exchange Me	Finalist
David Unaipon Award for an Emerging Aboriginal and/or Torres Strait Writer	Maria van Neerven	To Give Them a Voice	Winner
David Unaipon Award for an Emerging Aboriginal and/or Torres Strait Writer	Lulu Houdini	guniimara	Finalist
David Unaipon Award for an Emerging Aboriginal and/or Torres Strait Writer	Brooke Scobie	Always and Again	Finalist

=== 2022 ===
The winners were announced on 8 September 2022.

List of 2022 Queensland Literary Awards Recipients
Category	Author	Title	Result
Queensland Premier's Award for a Work of State Significance	Quentin Beresford	Wounded Country: The Murray-Darling Basin – a contested history	Winner
Queensland Premier's Award for a Work of State Significance	Sara El Sayed	Muddy People	Finalist
Queensland Premier's Award for a Work of State Significance	Mirandi Riwoe	The Burnished Sun	Finalist
Queensland Premier's Award for a Work of State Significance	John Shobbrook	Operation Jungle	Finalist
Queensland Premier's Award for a Work of State Significance	Chelsea Watego	Another Day in the Colony	Finalist
The Courier-Mail People's Choice Queensland Book of the Year Award	Chelsea Watego	Another Day in the Colony	Winner
The Courier-Mail People's Choice Queensland Book of the Year Award	Ed Ayres	Whole Notes	Finalist
The Courier-Mail People's Choice Queensland Book of the Year Award	Al Campbell	The Keepers	Finalist
The Courier-Mail People's Choice Queensland Book of the Year Award	Sara El Sayed	Muddy People	Finalist
The Courier-Mail People's Choice Queensland Book of the Year Award	Anita Heiss	Bila Yarrudhanggalangdhuray	Finalist
The Courier-Mail People's Choice Queensland Book of the Year Award	Krissy Kneen	The Three Burials of Lotty Kneen	Finalist
The Courier-Mail People's Choice Queensland Book of the Year Award	Nicolas Rothwell	Red Heaven	Finalist
The Courier-Mail People's Choice Queensland Book of the Year Award	Dime Sheppard	Crime Writer	Finalist
The University of Queensland Fiction Book Award	Michael Mohammed Ahmad	The Other Half of You	Winner
The University of Queensland Fiction Book Award	Jessica Au	Cold Enough for Snow	Finalist
The University of Queensland Fiction Book Award	Mandy Beaumont	The Furies	Finalist
The University of Queensland Fiction Book Award	Al Campbell	The Keepers	Finalist
The University of Queensland Fiction Book Award	Yumna Kassab	Australiana	Finalist
The University of Queensland Non-Fiction Book Award	Claire G. Coleman	Lies, Damned Lies	Winner
The University of Queensland Non-Fiction Book Award	Sara El Sayed	Muddy People	Finalist
The University of Queensland Non-Fiction Book Award	Amani Haydar	The Mother Wound	Finalist
The University of Queensland Non-Fiction Book Award	Krissy Kneen	The Three Burials of Lotty Kneen	
The University of Queensland Non-Fiction Book Award	Chelsea Watego	Another Day in the Colony	
Judith Wright Calanthe Award for a Poetry Collection	Pam Brown	Stasis Shuffle	Winner
Judith Wright Calanthe Award for a Poetry Collection	Eunice Andrada	Take Care	Finalist
Judith Wright Calanthe Award for a Poetry Collection	Dan Disney	accelerations & inertias	Finalist
Judith Wright Calanthe Award for a Poetry Collection	Gavin Yuan Gao	At the Altar of Touch	Finalist
Judith Wright Calanthe Award for a Poetry Collection	Ann Vickery	Bees Do Both: An antagonist’s carepack	Finalist
University of Southern Queensland Steele Rudd Award for a Short Story Collection	Tony Birch	Dark as Last Night	Winner
University of Southern Queensland Steele Rudd Award for a Short Story Collection	Merlinda Bobis	The Kindness of Birds	Finalist
University of Southern Queensland Steele Rudd Award for a Short Story Collection	Mirandi Riwoe	The Burnished Sun	Finalist
University of Southern Queensland Steele Rudd Award for a Short Story Collection	Fiona Robertson	If You’re Happy	Finalist
University of Southern Queensland Steele Rudd Award for a Short Story Collection	Su-May Tan	Lake Malibu and Other Stories	Finalist
Griffith University Young Adult Book Award	Felicity Castagna	Girls in Boys’ Cars	Winner
Griffith University Young Adult Book Award	Brian Falkner	Katipo Joe: Wolf’s lair	Finalist
Griffith University Young Adult Book Award	Michael Hyde	Morrison and Mr Moore	Finalist
Griffith University Young Adult Book Award	Kay Kerr	Social Queue	Finalist
Griffith University Young Adult Book Award	Carly Nugent	Sugar	Finalist
Children's Book Award	Kunyi June Anne McInerney	Kunyi	Winner
Children's Book Award	Peter Carnavas	My Brother Ben	Finalist
Children's Book Award	Shirley Marr	A Glasshouse of Stars	Finalist
Children's Book Award	Sandhya Parappukkaran, illus by Michelle Pereira	The Boy Who Tried to Shrink His Name	Finalist
Children's Book Award	Corey Tutt, illus by Blak Douglas	The First Scientists	Finalist
Queensland Premier's Young Publishers and Writers Award	Rebecca Cheers and Marilena Hewitt		Winner
Queensland Writers Fellowships	Melissa Ashley, Geneve Flynn and Mary-Rose MacColl		Winner
Glendower Award for Emerging Queensland Author	Yen-Rong Wong	Things Left Unsaid	Winner
Glendower Award for Emerging Queensland Author	John Richards	The Interventions	Finalist
Glendower Award for Emerging Queensland Author	A E Macleod	Do you like the artist Georgia O’Keeffe?	Finalist
Glendower Award for Emerging Queensland Author	Emily Winter	Sunshowers	Finalist
David Unaipon Award for an Emerging Aboriginal and/or Torres Strait Writer	Mykaela Saunders	Always Will Be – stories of Goori sovereignty, from the future(s) of the Tweed	Winner
David Unaipon Award for an Emerging Aboriginal and/or Torres Strait Writer	Edoardo Crismani	Finding Billy Brown	Finalist
David Unaipon Award for an Emerging Aboriginal and/or Torres Strait Writer	Julie-Ann ‘Garrimaa’ Moore	Wawun, Judulu and The Big Storm	Finalist
David Unaipon Award for an Emerging Aboriginal and/or Torres Strait Writer	Rick Slager	Untitled	Finalist
David Unaipon Award for an Emerging Aboriginal and/or Torres Strait Writer	Aunty Joan Tranter	Unplanned Journey: A personal account of one Indigenous woman’s life	Finalist

=== 2021 ===
The winners were announced on 9 September 2021.

List of 2021 Queensland Literary Awards Recipients
Category	Author	Title	Result
Queensland Premier's Award for a Work of State Significance	Fiona Foley	Biting the Clouds: A Badtjala perspective on the Aboriginals Protection and Restriction of the Sale of Opium Act, 1897	Winner
Queensland Premier's Award for a Work of State Significance	Lech Blaine	Car Crash	Finalist
Queensland Premier's Award for a Work of State Significance	Laura Elvery	Ordinary Matter	Finalist
Queensland Premier's Award for a Work of State Significance	Pattie Lees with Adam C Lees	A Question of Colour	Finalist
Queensland Premier's Award for a Work of State Significance	Jaya Savige	Change Machine	Finalist
The Courier-Mail People's Choice Queensland Book of the Year Award	Mary Li	Mary’s Last Dance: The untold story of the wife of Mao’s Last Dancer	Winner
The Courier-Mail People's Choice Queensland Book of the Year Award	Trent Dalton	All Our Shimmering Skies	Finalist
The Courier-Mail People's Choice Queensland Book of the Year Award	Sandra Hogan	With My Little Eye	Finalist
The Courier-Mail People's Choice Queensland Book of the Year Award	Kathleen Jennings	Flyaway	Finalist
The Courier-Mail People's Choice Queensland Book of the Year Award	Susan Johnson	From Where I Fell	Finalist
The Courier-Mail People's Choice Queensland Book of the Year Award	Grantlee Kieza	Banks	Finalist
The Courier-Mail People's Choice Queensland Book of the Year Award	Pattie Lees with Adam C Lees	A Question of Colour: My journey to belonging	Finalist
The Courier-Mail People's Choice Queensland Book of the Year Award	A G Slatter	All the Murmuring Bones	Finalist
The University of Queensland Fiction Book Award	Nardi Simpson	Song of the Crocodile	Winner
The University of Queensland Fiction Book Award	Kavita Bedford	Friends & Dark Shapes	Finalist
The University of Queensland Fiction Book Award	S L Lim	Revenge	Finalist
The University of Queensland Fiction Book Award	Amanda Lohrey	The Labyrinth	Finalist
The University of Queensland Fiction Book Award	Charlotte McConaghy	Migrations	Finalist
The University of Queensland Non-Fiction Book Award	Luke Stegemann	Amnesia Road: Landscape, violence and memory	Winner
The University of Queensland Non-Fiction Book Award	Lech Blaine	Car Crash	Finalist
The University of Queensland Non-Fiction Book Award	Eleanor Hogan	Into the Loneliness	Finalist
The University of Queensland Non-Fiction Book Award	Henry Reynolds	Truth-Telling	Finalist
The University of Queensland Non-Fiction Book Award	Marian Wilkinson	The Carbon Club	Finalist
Judith Wright Calanthe Award for a Poetry Collection	Ouyang Yu	Terminally Poetic	Winner
Judith Wright Calanthe Award for a Poetry Collection	Evelyn Araluen	Dropbear	Finalist
Judith Wright Calanthe Award for a Poetry Collection	Benjamin Dodds	Airplane Baby Banana Blanket	Finalist
Judith Wright Calanthe Award for a Poetry Collection	Jaya Savige	Change Machine	Finalist
Judith Wright Calanthe Award for a Poetry Collection	Elfie Shiosaki	Homecoming	Finalist
University of Southern Queensland Steele Rudd Award for a Short Story Collection	Laura Elvery	Ordinary Matter	Winner
University of Southern Queensland Steele Rudd Award for a Short Story Collection	Melissa Manning	Smokehouse	Finalist
University of Southern Queensland Steele Rudd Award for a Short Story Collection	Elizabeth Tan	Smart Ovens for Lonely People	Finalist
University of Southern Queensland Steele Rudd Award for a Short Story Collection	Adam Thompson	Born Into This	Finalist
University of Southern Queensland Steele Rudd Award for a Short Story Collection	Barry Lee Thompson	Broken Rules and Other Stories	Finalist
Griffith University Young Adult Book Award	Cath Moore	Metal Fish, Falling Snow	Winner
Griffith University Young Adult Book Award	Davina Bell	The End of the World is Bigger Than Love	Finalist
Griffith University Young Adult Book Award	Rebecca Lim	Tiger Daughter	Finalist
Griffith University Young Adult Book Award	Gary Lonesborough	The Boy From the Mish	Finalist
Griffith University Young Adult Book Award	Lili Wilkinson	The Erasure Initiative	Finalist
Griffith University Children's Book Award	Kirli Saunders & Dub Leffler	Bindi	Winner
Griffith University Children's Book Award	Sami Bayly	The Illustrated Encyclopedia of Dangerous Animals	Finalist
Griffith University Children's Book Award	Meg McKinlay, illus by Matt Ottley	How to Make a Bird	Finalist
Griffith University Children's Book Award	Jaclyn Moriarty, illus by Kelly Canby	The Stolen Prince of Cloudburst	Finalist
Griffith University Children's Book Award	Katrina Nannestad, illus by Martina Heiduczek	We Are Wolves	Finalist
Queensland Premier's Young Publishers and Writers Award	Allanah Hunt and Ellen Wengert		Winner
Queensland Writers Fellowships	Tabitha Bird, Ella Jeffery, and Kali Napier		Winner
Glendower Award for Emerging Queensland Author	Siang Lu	The Whitewash	Winner
Glendower Award for Emerging Queensland Author	Jason Gent	On the Exhale	Finalist
Glendower Award for Emerging Queensland Author	Natalie Sprite	The Luminous Heart	Finalist
Glendower Award for Emerging Queensland Author	Lillian Telford	It’s Chemical	Finalist
David Unaipon Award for an Emerging Aboriginal and/or Torres Strait Writer	Ngankiburka-mekauwe (Senior Woman of Water) Georgina Williams	Mekauwe=Tears Volume #1 Poems (Notes For Song) 1970–2020	Winner
David Unaipon Award for an Emerging Aboriginal and/or Torres Strait Writer	Chella Goldwin	Politiks	Finalist

=== 2020 ===
The winners were announced on 4 September 2020.

List of 2020 Queensland Literary Awards Recipients
Category	Author	Title	Result
Queensland Premier's Award for a Work of State Significance	Joe Gorman	Heartland: How Rugby League Explains Queensland	Winner
Queensland Premier's Award for a Work of State Significance	Melanie Myers	Meet Me at Lennon’s	Finalist
Queensland Premier's Award for a Work of State Significance	Mirandi Riwoe	Stone Sky Gold Mountain	Finalist
Queensland Premier's Award for a Work of State Significance	Jessica White	Hearing Maud	Finalist
The Courier-Mail People's Choice Queensland Book of the Year Award	Tabitha Bird	A Lifetime of Impossible Days	Winner
The Courier-Mail People's Choice Queensland Book of the Year Award	Phil Brown	The Kowloon Kid	Finalist
The Courier-Mail People's Choice Queensland Book of the Year Award	Margaret Cook	A River with a City Problem	Finalist
The Courier-Mail People's Choice Queensland Book of the Year Award	Darryl Jones	Feeding the Birds at Your Table	Finalist
The Courier-Mail People's Choice Queensland Book of the Year Award	Melanie Myers	Meet Me at Lennon's	Finalist
The Courier-Mail People's Choice Queensland Book of the Year Award	Amanda Niehaus	The Breeding Season	Finalist
The Courier-Mail People's Choice Queensland Book of the Year Award	Mirandi Riwoe	Stone Sky Gold Mountain	Finalist
The Courier-Mail People's Choice Queensland Book of the Year Award	Jessica White	Hearing Maud	Finalist
The University of Queensland Fiction Book Award	Mirandi Riwoe	Stone Sky Gold Mountain	Winner
The University of Queensland Fiction Book Award	Anna Krien	Act of Grace	Finalist
The University of Queensland Fiction Book Award	Philip Salom	The Returns	Finalist
The University of Queensland Fiction Book Award	Ronnie Scott	The Adversary	Finalist
The University of Queensland Fiction Book Award	Tara June Winch	The Yield	Finalist
The University of Queensland Non-Fiction Book Award	Helen Ennis	Olive Cotton: A Life in Photography	Winner
The University of Queensland Non-Fiction Book Award	James Dunk	Bedlam at Botany Bay	Finalist
The University of Queensland Non-Fiction Book Award	Brenda Niall	Friends and Rivals	Finalist
The University of Queensland Non-Fiction Book Award	Cassandra Pybus	Truganini: Journey Through the Apocalypse	Finalist
The University of Queensland Non-Fiction Book Award	Arnold Zable	The Watermill	Finalist
Judith Wright Calanthe Award for a Poetry Collection	П. O.	Heide	Winner
Judith Wright Calanthe Award for a Poetry Collection	Peter Boyle	Enfolded in the Wings of a Great Darkness	Finalist
Judith Wright Calanthe Award for a Poetry Collection	Stuart Cooke	Lyre	Finalist
Judith Wright Calanthe Award for a Poetry Collection	Ellen van Neerven	Throat	Finalist
Judith Wright Calanthe Award for a Poetry Collection	Charmaine Papertalk Green	Nganajungu Yagu	Finalist
University of Southern Queensland Steele Rudd Award for a Short Story Collection	Joey Bui	Lucky Ticket	Winner
University of Southern Queensland Steele Rudd Award for a Short Story Collection	Alice Bishop	A Constant Hum	Finalist
University of Southern Queensland Steele Rudd Award for a Short Story Collection	Yumna Kassab	The House of Youssef	Finalist
University of Southern Queensland Steele Rudd Award for a Short Story Collection	Sean O’Beirne	A Couple of Things Before the End	Finalist
University of Southern Queensland Steele Rudd Award for a Short Story Collection	Josephine Rowe	Here Until August	Finalist
Griffith University Young Adult Book Award	Lisa Fuller	Ghost Bird	Winner
Griffith University Young Adult Book Award	Sarah Epstein	Deep Water	Finalist
Griffith University Young Adult Book Award	Eliza Henry-Jones	How to Grow a Family Tree	Finalist
Griffith University Young Adult Book Award	Nina Kenwood	It Sounded Better in My Head	Finalist
Griffith University Young Adult Book Award	Vikki Wakefield	This Is How We Change the Ending	Finalist
Griffith University Children's Book Award	Penny Tangey	As Fast As I Can	Winner
Griffith University Children's Book Award	Tristan Bancks	Detention	Finalist
Griffith University Children's Book Award	Tamsin Janu	Winston and the Wondrous Wooba Gymnastics Club	Finalist
Griffith University Children's Book Award	Jess McGeachin	Fly	Finalist
Griffith University Children's Book Award	Caroline Magerl	Nop	Finalist
Queensland Premier's Young Publishers and Writers Award	Zenobia Frost and Yen-Rong Wong		Winner
Queensland Writers Fellowships	Sara El Sayed, Anna Jacobson and Amanda Niehaus		Winner
Glendower Award for Emerging Queensland Author	Fiona Robertson	If You're Happy	Winner
Glendower Award for Emerging Queensland Author	Bianca Millroy	The Solitary Light	Finalist
Glendower Award for Emerging Queensland Author	Jonathan O’Brien	Daddy & Other Father Figures	Finalist
Glendower Award for Emerging Queensland Author	Jenny Ruge	Without a Word	Finalist
Glendower Award for Emerging Queensland Author	Siall Waterbright	As We Knew It	Finalist
David Unaipon Award for an Emerging Aboriginal and/or Torres Strait Writer	Jazz Money	The Space Between the Paperbark	Winner
David Unaipon Award for an Emerging Aboriginal and/or Torres Strait Writer	Boyd Quakawoot	Valley of Cane and Crows	Finalist
David Unaipon Award for an Emerging Aboriginal and/or Torres Strait Writer	Mykaela Saunders	Last Rites of Spring	Finalist
David Unaipon Award for an Emerging Aboriginal and/or Torres Strait Writer	Melanie Saward	Burn	Finalist

=== 2019 ===
The winners were announced on 12 November 2019.

List of 2019 Queensland Literary Awards Recipients
Category	Author	Title	Result
Queensland Premier's Award for a Work of State Significance	Melissa Lucashenko	Too Much Lip	Winner
Queensland Premier's Award for a Work of State Significance	Matthew Condon	The Night Dragon	Finalist
Queensland Premier's Award for a Work of State Significance	Trent Dalton	Boy Swallows Universe	Finalist
Queensland Premier's Award for a Work of State Significance	Jake Goetz	meditations with passing water	Finalist
Queensland Premier's Award for a Work of State Significance	Krissy Kneen	Wintering	Finalist
The Courier-Mail People's Choice Queensland Book of the Year Award	Lindsay Simpson	Adani, Following Its Dirty Footsteps: A Personal Story	Winner
The Courier-Mail People's Choice Queensland Book of the Year Award	Toni Risson	Brisbane’s Greek Cafes: A Million Malted Milks	Finalist
The Courier-Mail People's Choice Queensland Book of the Year Award	Trent Dalton	Boy Swallows Universe	Finalist
The Courier-Mail People's Choice Queensland Book of the Year Award	James Halford	Requiem with Yellow Butterflies: A Memoir	Finalist
The Courier-Mail People's Choice Queensland Book of the Year Award	Krissy Kneen	Wintering	Finalist
The Courier-Mail People's Choice Queensland Book of the Year Award	Melissa Lucashenko	Too Much Lip	Finalist
The Courier-Mail People's Choice Queensland Book of the Year Award	Rick Searle	Charles Ulm	Finalist
The Courier-Mail People's Choice Queensland Book of the Year Award	Rohan Wilson	Daughter of Bad Times	Finalist
University of Queensland Fiction Book Award	Carrie Tiffany	Exploded View	Winner
University of Queensland Fiction Book Award	Nigel Featherstone	Bodies of Men	Finalist
University of Queensland Fiction Book Award	Melissa Lucashenko	Too Much Lip	Finalist
University of Queensland Fiction Book Award	Kristina Olsson	Shell	Finalist
University of Queensland Fiction Book Award	Rohan Wilson	Daughter of Bad Times	Finalist
University of Queensland Non-Fiction Book Award	Mary Hoban	An Unconventional Wife: The Life of Julia Sorell Arnold	Winner
University of Queensland Non-Fiction Book Award	Alice Gorman	Dr Space Junk vs The Universe: Archaeology and the future	Finalist
University of Queensland Non-Fiction Book Award	Stuart Kells	Shakespeare’s Library: Unlocking the greatest mystery in literature	Finalist
University of Queensland Non-Fiction Book Award	Harry Saddler	The Eastern Curlew	Finalist
University of Queensland Non-Fiction Book Award	Christina Thompson	Sea People: The puzzle of Polynesia	Finalist
University of Southern Queensland History Book Award	Mary Hoban	An Unconventional Wife: The Life of Julia Sorell Arnold	Winner
University of Southern Queensland History Book Award	Judith Brett	From Secret Ballot to Democracy Sausage: How Australia got compulsory voting	Finalist
University of Southern Queensland History Book Award	Kate Legge	Kindred: A Cradle Mountain love story	Finalist
University of Southern Queensland History Book Award	Elizabeth Malcolm and Dianne Hall	A New History of the Irish in Australia	Finalist
University of Southern Queensland History Book Award	Clare Wright	You Daughters of Freedom: The Australians who won the vote and inspired the world	Finalist
State Library of Queensland Poetry Collection – Judith Wright Calanthe Award	Alison Whittaker	Blakwork	Winner
State Library of Queensland Poetry Collection – Judith Wright Calanthe Award	Liam Ferney	Hot Take	Finalist
State Library of Queensland Poetry Collection – Judith Wright Calanthe Award	Keri Glastonbury	Newcastle Sonnet	Finalist
State Library of Queensland Poetry Collection – Judith Wright Calanthe Award	Marjon Mossammaparast	That Sight	Finalist
State Library of Queensland Poetry Collection – Judith Wright Calanthe Award	Omar Sakr	The Lost Arabs	Finalist
University of Southern Queensland Australian Short Story Collection – Steele Rudd Award	Debra Adelaide	Zebra: And Other Stories	Winner
University of Southern Queensland Australian Short Story Collection – Steele Rudd Award	Robert Drewe	The True Colour of the Sea	Finalist
University of Southern Queensland Australian Short Story Collection – Steele Rudd Award	Ryan O'Neill	The Drover's Wives	Finalist
Griffith University Young Adult Book Award	Karen Foxlee	Lenny’s Book of Everything	Winner
Griffith University Young Adult Book Award	Sarah Epstein	Small Spaces	Finalist
Griffith University Young Adult Book Award	Helena Fox	How it Feels to Float	Finalist
Griffith University Young Adult Book Award	Steven Herrick	The Bogan Mondrian	Finalist
Griffith University Young Adult Book Award	Ambelin Kwaymullina and Ezekiel Kwaymullina	Catching Teller Crow	Finalist
Griffith University Children's Book Award	Jaclyn Moriarty	The Slightly Alarming Tale of the Whispering Wars	Winner
Griffith University Children's Book Award	Lorraine Marwood	Leave Taking	Finalist
Griffith University Children's Book Award	Carl Merrison and Hakea Hustler	Black Cockatoo	Finalist
Griffith University Children's Book Award	Emily Rodda	His Name was Walter	Finalist
Griffith University Children's Book Award	Margaret Wild and Mandy Ord	Chalk Boy	Finalist
Queensland Premier's Young Publishers and Writers Awards	Ella Jeffery and Ellen van Neerven		Winner
Queensland Writers Fellowships	Claire Christian, Sarah Holland-Batt and Emily O'Grady		Winner
Glendower Award for Emerging Queensland Author for unpublished manuscript	Rhiannon Ratcliffe Wilde	Henry Hamlet’s Heart	Winner
Glendower Award for Emerging Queensland Author for unpublished manuscript	Sue Goldstiver	Little Birds	Finalist
Glendower Award for Emerging Queensland Author for unpublished manuscript	Karen Hollands	The Still Point of Being	Finalist
Glendower Award for Emerging Queensland Author for unpublished manuscript	Jack Lio	Apparitions	Finalist
Unpublished Indigenous Writer – David Unaipon Award	Not awarded.		
QUT Digital Literature Award	Mez Breeze	V[R]ignettes	Winner
QUT Digital Literature Award	Eda Gunaydin	Gothic Body, in Two Parts	Finalist
QUT Digital Literature Award	Benjamin Laird	Psychometric Researches	Finalist
QUT Digital Literature Award	C B Mako and M J Flamiano	ITERATION – Part 3/Chapter 3	Finalist
QUT Digital Literature Award	Jason Nelson	The Wonders of Lost Trajectories	Finalist

=== 2018 ===
List of 2018 Queensland Literary Awards Recipients
Category	Author	Title	Result
Queensland Premier's Award for a Work of State Significance	Jackie Ryan	We'll Show the World: Expo 88	Winner
Queensland Premier's Award for a Work of State Significance	Benjamin Allmon and David Kelly	The Saltwater Story	Finalist
Queensland Premier's Award for a Work of State Significance	Anna Broinowski	Please Explain	Finalist
Queensland Premier's Award for a Work of State Significance	Barbara Miller	White Woman Black Heart: Journey Home to Old Mapoon	Finalist
Queensland Premier's Award for a Work of State Significance	Beth Wilson	Brisbane Houses with Garden	Finalist
The Courier Mail People's Choice Queensland Book of the Year Award – Brisbane Houses with Gardens, Beth Wilson	Beth Wilson	Brisbane Houses with Gardens	Winner
The Courier Mail People's Choice Queensland Book of the Year Award – Brisbane Houses with Gardens, Beth Wilson	Venero Armanno	Burning Down	Finalist
The Courier Mail People's Choice Queensland Book of the Year Award – Brisbane Houses with Gardens, Beth Wilson	Eddie Ayres	Danger Music	Finalist
The Courier Mail People's Choice Queensland Book of the Year Award – Brisbane Houses with Gardens, Beth Wilson	Ben Hobson	To Become a Whale	Finalist
The Courier Mail People's Choice Queensland Book of the Year Award – Brisbane Houses with Gardens, Beth Wilson	Emily O'Grady	The Yellow House	Finalist
The Courier Mail People's Choice Queensland Book of the Year Award – Brisbane Houses with Gardens, Beth Wilson	Holly Ringland	The Lost Flowers of Alice Hart	Finalist
The Courier Mail People's Choice Queensland Book of the Year Award – Brisbane Houses with Gardens, Beth Wilson	Jackie Ryan	We'll Show the World: Expo 88	Finalist
The Courier Mail People's Choice Queensland Book of the Year Award – Brisbane Houses with Gardens, Beth Wilson	Charlie Veron	A Life Underwater	Finalist
University of Queensland Fiction Book Award	Kim Scott	Taboo	Winner
University of Queensland Fiction Book Award	Robbie Arnott	Flames	Finalist
University of Queensland Fiction Book Award	Shokoofeh Azar	The Enlightenment of the Greengage Tree	Finalist
University of Queensland Fiction Book Award	Mirandi Riwoe	The Fish Girl	Finalist
University of Queensland Fiction Book Award	Tim Winton	The Shepherd's Hut	Finalist
University of Queensland Non-Fiction Book Award	Alexis Wright	Tracker	Winner
University of Queensland Non-Fiction Book Award	Judith Brett	The Enigmatic Mr Deakin	Finalist
University of Queensland Non-Fiction Book Award	Phillipa McGuinness	The Year Everything Changed: 2001	Finalist
University of Queensland Non-Fiction Book Award	Charles Massy	Call of the Reed Warbler: A New Agriculture — A New Earth	Finalist
University of Queensland Non-Fiction Book Award	Michael Pembroke	Korea: Where the American Century Began	Finalist
University of Southern Queensland History Book Award	Jackie Ryan	We'll Show the World: Expo 88	Winner
University of Southern Queensland History Book Award	Judith Brett	The Enigmatic Mr Deakin	Finalist
University of Southern Queensland History Book Award	Billy Griffiths	Deep Time Dreaming: Uncovering Ancient Australia	Finalist
University of Southern Queensland History Book Award	Jayne Persian	Beautiful Balts: From Displaced Persons to New Australians	Finalist
University of Southern Queensland History Book Award	Christina Twomey	The Battle Within: POWs in Postwar Australia	Finalist
State Library of Queensland Poetry Collection – Judith Wright Calanthe Award	Michael Farrell	I Love Poetry	Winner
State Library of Queensland Poetry Collection – Judith Wright Calanthe Award	Pam Brown	click here for what we do	Finalist
State Library of Queensland Poetry Collection – Judith Wright Calanthe Award	Bonny Cassidy	Chatelaine	Finalist
State Library of Queensland Poetry Collection – Judith Wright Calanthe Award	Oscar Schwartz	The Honeymoon Stage	Finalist
State Library of Queensland Poetry Collection – Judith Wright Calanthe Award	Bella Li	Lost Lake	Finalist
University of Southern Queensland Australian Short Story Collection – Steele Rudd Award	Jennifer Down	Pulse Points	Winner
University of Southern Queensland Australian Short Story Collection – Steele Rudd Award	Claire Aman	Bird Country	Finalist
University of Southern Queensland Australian Short Story Collection – Steele Rudd Award	Tony Birch	Common People	Finalist
University of Southern Queensland Australian Short Story Collection – Steele Rudd Award	Stephanie Buckle	Habits of Silence	Finalist
University of Southern Queensland Australian Short Story Collection – Steele Rudd Award	Laura Elvery	Trick of the Light	Finalist
Griffith University Young Adult Book Award	Cally Black	In the Dark Spaces	Winner
Griffith University Young Adult Book Award	Victoria Carless	The Dream Walker	Finalist
Griffith University Young Adult Book Award	Scot Gardner	Sparrow	Finalist
Griffith University Young Adult Book Award	Erin Gough	Amelia Westlake	Finalist
Griffith University Young Adult Book Award	Pip Harry	Because of You	Finalist
Griffith University Children's Book Award	Peter Carnavas	The Elephant	Winner
Griffith University Children's Book Award	Sarah Brennan, illustrated by Jane Tanner	The Storm Whale	Finalist
Griffith University Children's Book Award	Jane Godwin, illustrated by Anna Walker	Go Go and the Silver Shoes	Finalist
Griffith University Children's Book Award	Emily Rodda	The Shop at Hoopers Bend	Finalist
Griffith University Children's Book Award	Anne Spudvilas	Swan Lake	Finalist
Queensland Premier's Young Publishers and Writers Awards	Anna Jacobson and Bri Lee		Winner
Queensland Writers Fellowships	Michael Gerard Bauer, Jackie Ryan and Laura Elvery		Winner
Glendower Award for Emerging Queensland Author for unpublished manuscript	Melanie Myers	Garrison Town	Winner
Glendower Award for Emerging Queensland Author for unpublished manuscript	Karen Herschell	fate, revenge and chipburgers	Finalist
Glendower Award for Emerging Queensland Author for unpublished manuscript	Laura Kenny	On Either Side	Finalist
Glendower Award for Emerging Queensland Author for unpublished manuscript	Christopher Przewloka	Hidebound	Finalist
Unpublished Indigenous Writer – David Unaipon Award	Kirstie Parker	The Making of Ruby Champion	Winner
Unpublished Indigenous Writer – David Unaipon Award	Melanie Saward	Why Worry Now	Finalist
Unpublished Indigenous Writer – David Unaipon Award	Wendy Somerville	Jilba's Song	Finalist
Unpublished Indigenous Writer – David Unaipon Award	Waiata Telfer	Song — The Story of a Girl, a Bird and a Teapot	Finalist
Unpublished Indigenous Writer – David Unaipon Award	Teila Watson	Destinations Past Present Future: Diving Through Timelines	Finalist
QUT Digital Literature Award	David Thomas Henry Wright, with Chris Arnold	Little Emperor Syndrome	Winner
QUT Digital Literature Award	Mez Breeze	Our Cupidity Coda	Finalist
QUT Digital Literature Award	Mez Breeze	A Place Called Ormalcy	Finalist
QUT Digital Literature Award	Benjamin Laird	Core Values	Finalist

=== 2017 ===
List of 2017 Queensland Literary Awards Recipients
Category	Author	Title	Result
Queensland Premier's Award for a Work of State Significance	Bill Wilkie	The Daintree Blockade: The Battle for Australia's Tropical Rainforests	Winner
Queensland Premier's Award for a Work of State Significance	Matthew Condon	Little Fish Are Sweet	Finalist
Queensland Premier's Award for a Work of State Significance	Mary-Rose MacColl	For a Girl	Finalist
Queensland Premier's Award for a Work of State Significance	Cathy McLennan	Saltwater	Finalist
The Courier Mail People's Choice Queensland Book of the Year Award	Cathy McLennan	Saltwater	Winner
The Courier Mail People's Choice Queensland Book of the Year Award	Melissa Ashley	The Birdman's Wife	Finalist
The Courier Mail People's Choice Queensland Book of the Year Award	Nick Earls	Vancouver	Finalist
The Courier Mail People's Choice Queensland Book of the Year Award	Richard Fidler	Ghost Empire	Finalist
The Courier Mail People's Choice Queensland Book of the Year Award	Ashley Hay	A Hundred Small Lessons	Finalist
The Courier Mail People's Choice Queensland Book of the Year Award	Anita Heiss	Barbed Wire and Cherry Blossoms	Finalist
The Courier Mail People's Choice Queensland Book of the Year Award	Joan Isaacs	To Prey and To Silence	Finalist
The Courier Mail People's Choice Queensland Book of the Year Award	Mary-Rose MacColl	For a Girl	Finalist
University of Queensland Fiction Book Award	Melissa Ashley	The Birdman's Wife	Winner
University of Queensland Fiction Book Award	Nick Earls	Vancouver	Finalist
University of Queensland Fiction Book Award	Ashley Hay	A Hundred Small Lessons	Finalist
University of Queensland Fiction Book Award	Hannah Kent	The Good People	Finalist
University of Queensland Fiction Book Award	Heather Rose	The Museum of Modern Love	Finalist
University of Queensland Non-Fiction Book Award	Cathy McLennan	Saltwater	Winner
University of Queensland Non-Fiction Book Award	Deng Adut and Ben Mckelvey	Songs of a War Boy	Finalist
University of Queensland Non-Fiction Book Award	Richard Fidler	Ghost Empire	Finalist
University of Queensland Non-Fiction Book Award	Mary-Rose MacColl	For a Girl	Finalist
University of Queensland Non-Fiction Book Award	Kim Mahood	Position Doubtful	Finalist
University of Southern Queensland History Book Award	Rebe Taylor	Into the Heart of Tasmania: A Search for Human Antiquity	Winner
University of Southern Queensland History Book Award	Rebecca Ananian-Welsh	The Tim Carmody Affair: Australia's Greatest Judicial Crisis	Finalist
University of Southern Queensland History Book Award	Andrew Lynch	Appleby	Finalist
University of Southern Queensland History Book Award	Paul Irish	Hidden in Plain View: The Aboriginal people of coastal Sydney	Finalist
University of Southern Queensland History Book Award	John Murphy	Evatt: A life	Finalist
State Library of Queensland Poetry Collection	Antigone Kefala	Judith Wright Calanthe Award – Fragments	Winner
State Library of Queensland Poetry Collection	Jordie Albiston	Euclid's Dog	Finalist
State Library of Queensland Poetry Collection	Carmen Leigh Keates	Meteorites	Finalist
State Library of Queensland Poetry Collection	Cassie Lewis	The Blue Decodes	Finalist
State Library of Queensland Poetry Collection	Omar Sakr	These Wild Houses	Finalist
University of Southern Queensland Australian Short Story Collection – Steele Rudd Award	Kyra Giorgi	The Circle and the Equator	Winner
University of Southern Queensland Australian Short Story Collection – Steele Rudd Award	Michelle Cahill	Letter to Pessoa	Finalist
University of Southern Queensland Australian Short Story Collection – Steele Rudd Award	Kyra Giorgi	The Circle and the Equator	Finalist
University of Southern Queensland Australian Short Story Collection – Steele Rudd Award	Tara June Winch	After the Carnage	Finalist
Griffith University Young Adult Book Award	Cath Crowley	Words in Deep Blue	Winner
Griffith University Young Adult Book Award	Simon Butters	The Hounded	Finalist
Griffith University Young Adult Book Award	Zana Fraillon	The Bone Sparrow	Finalist
Griffith University Young Adult Book Award	Mark Smith	The Road to Winter	Finalist
Griffith University Young Adult Book Award	Richard Yaxley	This is My Song	Finalist
Griffith University Children's Book Award	Lisa Shanahan	The Grand, Genius Summer of Henry Hoobler	Winner
Griffith University Children's Book Award	Gus Gordon	Somewhere Else	Finalist
Griffith University Children's Book Award	Paul Jennings	A Different Dog	Finalist
Griffith University Children's Book Award	Bren MacDibble	How to Bee	Finalist
Griffith University Children's Book Award	Wendy Orr	Dragonfly Song	Finalist
Queensland Premier's Young Publishers and Writers Awards	Lech Blaine and Mindy Gill		Winner
Queensland Writers Fellowships	Mirandi Riwoe, Zenobia Frost and Linda Neil		Winner
Emerging Queensland Author – Manuscript Award	Janet Lee	The Killing of Louisa	Winner
Emerging Queensland Author – Manuscript Award	Anna Jacobson	How to Knit a Human	Finalist
Emerging Queensland Author – Manuscript Award	Ben Marshall	The Gimp	Finalist
Emerging Queensland Author – Manuscript Award	Siall Waterbright	The Coming	Finalist
Unpublished Indigenous Writer – David Unaipon Award	Lisa Fuller	Mirrored Pieces	Winner
Unpublished Indigenous Writer – David Unaipon Award	Alicia Farmer	Mai Stori	Finalist
QUT Digital Literature Award	Jason Nelson	Nine Billion Branches	Winner
QUT Digital Literature Award	Mez Breeze	Inanimate Alice: Perpetual Nomads (Beta)	Finalist
QUT Digital Literature Award	Pascalle Burton	Generation Loss	Finalist
QUT Digital Literature Award	David Thomas Henry Wright	Paige and Power	Finalist
QUT Digital Literature Award	Marianna Shek	Limerence	Finalist

=== 2016 ===
List of 2016 Queensland Literary Awards Recipients
Category	Author	Title	Result
Queensland Premier's Award for a Work of State Significance	Lesley and Tammy Williams	Not Just Black and White	Winner
Queensland Premier's Award for a Work of State Significance	Nadia Buick and Madeleine King	Remotely Fashionable: A Story of Subtropical Style	Finalist
Queensland Premier's Award for a Work of State Significance	Matthew Condon	All Fall Down	Finalist
Queensland Premier's Award for a Work of State Significance	Elspeth Muir	Wasted: A Story of Alcohol, Grief and a Death in Brisbane	Finalist
Queensland Premier's Award for a Work of State Significance	P.J. Parker	The Long Goodbye	Finalist
The Courier Mail People's Choice Queensland Book of the Year Award	Mary-Rose MacColl	Swimming Home	Winner
The Courier Mail People's Choice Queensland Book of the Year Award	Trent Jamieson	Day Boy	Finalist
The Courier Mail People's Choice Queensland Book of the Year Award	Susan Johnson	The Landing	Finalist
The Courier Mail People's Choice Queensland Book of the Year Award	Cass Moriarty	The Promise Seed	Finalist
The Courier Mail People's Choice Queensland Book of the Year Award	Nadia Buick and Madeleine Kin	Remotely Fashionable: A Story of Subtropical Style	Finalist
The Courier Mail People's Choice Queensland Book of the Year Award	Matt Condon	All Fall Down	Finalist
The Courier Mail People's Choice Queensland Book of the Year Award	Elspeth Muir	Wasted: A Story of Alcohol, Grief and a Death in Brisbane	Finalist
The Courier Mail People's Choice Queensland Book of the Year Award	Cory Taylor	Dying: A Memoir	Finalist
University of Queensland Fiction Book Award	Georgia Blain	Between a Wolf and a Dog	Winner
University of Queensland Fiction Book Award	Tony Birch	Ghost River	Finalist
University of Queensland Fiction Book Award	David Dyer	The Midnight Watch	Finalist
University of Queensland Fiction Book Award	Patrick Holland	One	Finalist
University of Queensland Fiction Book Award	Charlotte Wood	The Natural Way of Thing	Finalist
University of Queensland Non-Fiction Book Award	Fiona Wright	Small Acts of Disappearance: Essays on Hunger	Winner
University of Queensland Non-Fiction Book Award	Madeline Gleeson	Offshore: Behind the Wire on Manus and Nauru	Finalist
University of Queensland Non-Fiction Book Award	Stan Grant	Talking to My Country	Finalist
University of Queensland Non-Fiction Book Award	Drusilla Modjeska	Second Half First	Finalist
University of Queensland Non-Fiction Book Award	Tim Winton	Island Home	Finalist
University of Southern Queensland History Book Award	Julia Martínez and Adrian Vickers	The Pearl Frontier: Indonesian Labour and Indigenous Encounters in Australia’s Northern Trading Network	Winner
University of Southern Queensland History Book Award	Vicken Babkenien and Peter Stanley	Armenia, Australia and the Great War	Finalist
University of Southern Queensland History Book Award	Stuart Macintyre	Australia’s Boldest Experiment	Finalist
University of Southern Queensland History Book Award	Jeff Maynard	Unseen Anzac	Finalist
University of Southern Queensland History Book Award	John Newton	The oldest foods on earth	Finalist
University of Southern Queensland History Book Award	Garry Wotherspoon	Gay Sydney	Finalist
State Library of Queensland Poetry Collection – Judith Wright Calanthe Award	David Musgrave	Anatomy of Voice	Winner
State Library of Queensland Poetry Collection – Judith Wright Calanthe Award	Joel Deane	Year of the Wasp	Finalist
State Library of Queensland Poetry Collection – Judith Wright Calanthe Award	Liam Ferney	Content	Finalist
State Library of Queensland Poetry Collection – Judith Wright Calanthe Award	Sarah Holland-Batt	The Hazards	Finalist
State Library of Queensland Poetry Collection – Judith Wright Calanthe Award	Chloe Wilson	Not Fox Nor Axe	Finalist
University of Southern Queensland Australian Short Story Collection – Steele Rudd Award	Elizabeth Harrower	A Few Days in the Country and other stories	Winner
University of Southern Queensland Australian Short Story Collection – Steele Rudd Award	Fiona McFarlane	The High Places	Winner
University of Southern Queensland Australian Short Story Collection – Steele Rudd Award	Tegan Bennett Daylight	Six Bedrooms	Finalist
University of Southern Queensland Australian Short Story Collection – Steele Rudd Award	Sonja Dechian	An Astronaut’s Life	Finalist
University of Southern Queensland Australian Short Story Collection – Steele Rudd Award	Julie Koh	Portable Curiosities	Finalist
Griffith University Young Adult Book Award	David Metzenthen	Dreaming the Enemy	Winner
Griffith University Young Adult Book Award	Will Kostakis	The Sidekicks	Finalist
Griffith University Young Adult Book Award	Glenda Millard	The Stars at October Bend	Finalist
Griffith University Young Adult Book Award	James Roy and Noël Zihabamwe	One Thousand Hills	Finalist
Griffith University Young Adult Book Award	Claire Zorn	One Would Think the Deep	Finalist
Griffith University Children's Book Award	Julie Hunt (author) and Dale Newman (illustrator)	KidGlovz	Winner
Griffith University Children's Book Award	Lucy Estela and Matt Ottley	Suri’s Wall	Finalist
Griffith University Children's Book Award	Bob Graham	How the Sun Got to Coco’s House	Finalist
Griffith University Children's Book Award	Libby Hathorn and Gaye Chapman	Incredibilia	Finalist
Griffith University Children's Book Award	Chris McKimmie	Me, Teddy	Finalist
Queensland Premier's Young Publishers and Writers Awards	Emily Craven and Michelle Law		Winner
Emerging Queensland Author – Manuscript Award	Not awarded.		
Unpublished Indigenous Writer – David Unaipon Award	Paul Collis	Dancing Home	Winner
Unpublished Indigenous Writer – David Unaipon Award	Yvonne Weldon	67 Days	Finalist
Unpublished Indigenous Writer – David Unaipon Award	B.A. (Boyd) Quakawoot	Song of Jessica	Finalist

=== 2015 ===
List of 2015 Queensland Literary Awards Recipients
Category	Author	Title	Result
Queensland Premier's Award for a Work of State Significance	Libby Connors	Warrior	Winner
Queensland Premier's Award for a Work of State Significance	Ellen van Neerven	Heat and Light	Finalist
Queensland Premier's Award for a Work of State Significance	Zoe Boccabella	Joe’s Fruit Shop and Milk Bar	Finalist
Queensland Premier's Award for a Work of State Significance	Mark Bahnisch	Queensland: Everything you ever wanted to know but were afraid to ask	Finalist
Queensland Premier's Award for a Work of State Significance	Anna Bligh	Through the Wall: Reflections on Leadership, Love and Survival	Finalist
The Courier Mail People's Choice Queensland Book of the Year Award	John Ahern	On the road...with the kids	Winner
The Courier Mail People's Choice Queensland Book of the Year Award	Nick Earls	Analogue Men	Finalist
The Courier Mail People's Choice Queensland Book of the Year Award	Mary Lou Simpson	From Convict to Politician	Finalist
The Courier Mail People's Choice Queensland Book of the Year Award	Zoe Boccabella	Joe’s Fruit Shop and Milk Bar	Finalist
The Courier Mail People's Choice Queensland Book of the Year Award	Patrick Holland	Navigatio	Finalist
The Courier Mail People's Choice Queensland Book of the Year Award	Inga Simpson	Nest	Finalist
The Courier Mail People's Choice Queensland Book of the Year Award	Kári Gíslason	The Ash Burner	Finalist
The Courier Mail People's Choice Queensland Book of the Year Award	David Murray	The Murder of Allison Baden-Clay	Finalist
University of Queensland Fiction Book Award	Joan London	The Golden Age	Winner
University of Queensland Fiction Book Award	Amanda Lohrey	A Short History of Richard Kline	Finalist
University of Queensland Fiction Book Award	Mark Henshaw	The Snow Kimono	Finalist
University of Queensland Fiction Book Award	Malcolm Knox	The Wonder Lover	Finalist
University of Queensland Fiction Book Award	Rohan Wilson	To Name Those Lost	Finalist
University of Queensland Non-Fiction Book Award	Don Watson	The Bush: Travels in the Heart of Australia	Winner
University of Queensland Non-Fiction Book Award	Brenda Niall	Mannix	Finalist
University of Queensland Non-Fiction Book Award	Anne Manne	The Life of I: The New Culture of Narcissism	Finalist
University of Queensland Non-Fiction Book Award	Annabel Crabb	The Wife Drought	Finalist
University of Queensland Non-Fiction Book Award	Karen Lamb	Thea Astley: Inventing Her Own Weather	Finalist
University of Southern Queensland History Book Award	Carolyn Holbrook	ANZAC, The Unauthorised Biography	Winner
University of Southern Queensland History Book Award	Angela Woollacott	Settler Society in the Australian Colonies: Self-Government and Imperial Culture	Finalist
University of Southern Queensland History Book Award	Christine Kenneally	The Invisible History of the Human Race	Finalist
University of Southern Queensland History Book Award	Agnieszka Sobocinska	Visiting the Neighbours: Australians in Asia	Finalist
University of Southern Queensland History Book Award	Sophie Cunningham	Warning: The Story of Cyclone Tracy	Finalist
State Library of Queensland Poetry Collection – Judith Wright Calanthe Award	Les Murray	Waiting for the Past	Winner
State Library of Queensland Poetry Collection – Judith Wright Calanthe Award	Susan Bradley Smith	Beds For All Who Come	Finalist
State Library of Queensland Poetry Collection – Judith Wright Calanthe Award	Robert Adamson	Net Needle	Finalist
State Library of Queensland Poetry Collection – Judith Wright Calanthe Award	David Brooks	Open House	Finalist
State Library of Queensland Poetry Collection – Judith Wright Calanthe Award	Lucy Dougan	The Guardians	Finalist
Australian Short Story Collection – Steele Rudd Award	Christos Tsiolkas	Merciless Gods	Winner
Australian Short Story Collection – Steele Rudd Award	Nic Low	Arms Race and Other Stories	Finalist
Australian Short Story Collection – Steele Rudd Award	Nick Jose	Bapo	Finalist
Australian Short Story Collection – Steele Rudd Award	Ellen van Neerven	Heat and Light	Finalist
Australian Short Story Collection – Steele Rudd Award	J.M. Coetzee	Three Stories	Finalist
Griffith University Young Adult Book Award	John Larkin	The Pause	Winner
Griffith University Young Adult Book Award	Darren Groth	Are you Seeing Me?	Finalist
Griffith University Young Adult Book Award	Justine Larbalestier	Razorhurst	Finalist
Griffith University Young Adult Book Award	Diana Sweeney	The Minnow	Finalist
Griffith University Young Adult Book Award	Jeri Kroll	Vanishing Point	Finalist
Children's Book Award	Meg McKinlay	A Single Stone	Winner
Children's Book Award	Tasmin Janu	Figgy in the World	Finalist
Children's Book Award	David Mackintosh	Lucky	Finalist
Children's Book Award	Nick Earls	New Boy	Finalist
Children's Book Award	Rebecca Young & Matt Ottley	Teacup	Finalist
Queensland Premier's Young Publishers and Writers Awards	Megan McGrath and Rebecca Jessen		Winner
Emerging Queensland Author – Manuscript Award	Elizabeth Kasmer	Aurora	Winner
Emerging Queensland Author – Manuscript Award	Imogen Smith	Araluen	Finalist
Emerging Queensland Author – Manuscript Award	K W George	Sargasso	Finalist
Emerging Queensland Author – Manuscript Award	Kate Elkington	Wool Spin Burn	Finalist
Unpublished Indigenous Writer – David Unaipon Award	Andrew Booth	The First Octoroon or Report of an Experimental Child	Winner
Unpublished Indigenous Writer – David Unaipon Award	Mayrah Yarraga Dreise	Social Consciousness Series	Finalist
Unpublished Indigenous Writer – David Unaipon Award	Patricia Lees with Adam C. Lees	A Question of Colour	Finalist

=== 2014 ===
List of 2014 Queensland Literary Awards Recipients
Category	Author	Title	Result
The Courier Mail People's Choice Queensland Book of the Year Award	Kellee Slater	How to do a Liver Transplant: Stories from my Surgical Life	Winner
The Courier Mail People's Choice Queensland Book of the Year Award	T. M. Clark	My Brother, But One	Finalist
The Courier Mail People's Choice Queensland Book of the Year Award	Frances Whiting	Walking on Trampolines	Finalist
The Courier Mail People's Choice Queensland Book of the Year Award	Catherine Titasey	My Island Homicide	Finalist
The Courier Mail People's Choice Queensland Book of the Year Award	Sally Breen	Atomic City	Finalist
The Courier Mail People's Choice Queensland Book of the Year Award	Matthew Condon	Jacks and Jokers	Finalist
The Courier Mail People's Choice Queensland Book of the Year Award	Deb Drummond and Janis Teunis	Lingering Doubts: Going Inside Brisbane's Arcade Murder	Finalist
The Courier Mail People's Choice Queensland Book of the Year Award	Keelen Mailman	The Power of Bones	Finalist
University of Queensland Fiction Book Award	Richard Flanagan	The Narrow Road to the Deep North	Winner
University of Queensland Fiction Book Award	Fiona Capp	Gotland	Finalist
University of Queensland Fiction Book Award	Alex Miller	Coal Creek	Finalist
University of Queensland Fiction Book Award	Tim Winton	Eyrie	Finalist
University of Queensland Fiction Book Award	Evie Wyld	All the Birds, Singing	Finalist
University of Queensland Non-Fiction Book Award	Paul Ham	1914: The Year the World Ended	Winner
University of Queensland Non-Fiction Book Award	Steve Bisley	Stillways	Finalist
University of Queensland Non-Fiction Book Award	Iain McCalman	The Reef	Finalist
University of Queensland Non-Fiction Book Award	Penny Olsen	An Eye for Nature: The Life and Art of William T. Cooper	Finalist
University of Queensland Non-Fiction Book Award	Janis Sheldrick	Nature's Line: George Goyder, surveyor, environmentalist, visionary	Finalist
University of Southern Queensland History Book Award	Joan Beaumont	Broken Nation	Winner
University of Southern Queensland History Book Award	Nicholas Clements	The Black War: Fear, Sex and Resistance in Tasmania	Finalist
University of Southern Queensland History Book Award	Iain McCalman	The Reef	Finalist
University of Southern Queensland History Book Award	Bruce Pascoe	Black Emu	Finalist
University of Southern Queensland History Book Award	Henry Reynolds	The Forgotten War	Finalist
University of Southern Queensland History Book Award	Clare Wright	The Forgotten Rebels of Eureka	Finalist
State Library of Queensland Poetry Collection – Judith Wright Calanthe Award	David Malouf	Earth Hour	Winner
State Library of Queensland Poetry Collection – Judith Wright Calanthe Award	Judith Beveridge	Devadatta’s Poems	Finalist
State Library of Queensland Poetry Collection – Judith Wright Calanthe Award	Rachael Briggs	Free Logic	Finalist
State Library of Queensland Poetry Collection – Judith Wright Calanthe Award	Liam Ferney	Boom	Finalist
State Library of Queensland Poetry Collection – Judith Wright Calanthe Award	Anthony Lawrence	Signal Flare	Finalist
Australian Short Story Collection – Steele Rudd Award	Ceridwen Dovey	Only the Animals	Winner
Australian Short Story Collection – Steele Rudd Award	Debra Adelaide	Letter to George Clooney	Finalist
Australian Short Story Collection – Steele Rudd Award	Tony Birch	The Promise	Finalist
Australian Short Story Collection – Steele Rudd Award	Luke Carman	An Elegant Young Man	Finalist
Australian Short Story Collection – Steele Rudd Award	Laura Jean McKay	Holiday in Cambodia	Finalist
Griffith University Young Adult Book Award	Jaclyn Moriarty	The Cracks in the Kingdom	Winner
Griffith University Young Adult Book Award	A.J. Betts	Zac and Mia	Finalist
Griffith University Young Adult Book Award	Felicity Castagna	The Incredible Here and Now	Finalist
Griffith University Young Adult Book Award	Kate Hendrick	The Accident	Finalist
Griffith University Young Adult Book Award	David Metzenthen	Tigerfish	Finalist
Children's Book Award	Jackie French	Refuge	Winner
Children's Book Award	Shaun Tan	Rules of Summer	Winner
Children's Book Award	Pamela Rushby	The Ratcatcher's Daughter	Finalist
Children's Book Award	Claire Saxby and Graham Byrne	Nature Storybooks: Big Red Kangaroo	Finalist
Children's Book Award	Samantha Wheeler	Smooch and Rose	Finalist
Emerging Queensland Author – Manuscript Award	Cathy McLennan	We Come From Saltwater People	Winner
Emerging Queensland Author – Manuscript Award	Leanne Nolan	Open Cut	Finalist
Emerging Queensland Author – Manuscript Award	Julie Kearney	3 for a Wedding, 4 for Death	Finalist
Unpublished Indigenous Writer – David Unaipon Award	Lesley & Tammy Williams	It’s Not Just Black and White	Winner

=== 2013 ===
List of 2013 Queensland Literary Awards Recipients
Category	Author	Title	Result
The Courier Mail People's Choice Queensland Book of the Year Award	Kate Morton	The Secret Keeper	Winner
The Courier Mail People's Choice Queensland Book of the Year Award	Susan Johnson	My Hundred Lovers	Finalist
The Courier Mail People's Choice Queensland Book of the Year Award	Melissa Lucashenko	Mullumbimby	Finalist
The Courier Mail People's Choice Queensland Book of the Year Award	Jamie Callister	The Man Who Invented Vegemite	Finalist
The Courier Mail People's Choice Queensland Book of the Year Award	Matthew Condon	Three Crooked Kings	Finalist
The Courier Mail People's Choice Queensland Book of the Year Award	Kristina Olsson	Boy, Lost	Finalist
Deloitte Fiction Book Award	Melissa Lucashenko	Mullumbimby	Winner
Deloitte Fiction Book Award	Murray Bail	The Voyage	Finalist
Deloitte Fiction Book Award	Susan Johnson	My Hundred Lovers	Finalist
Deloitte Fiction Book Award	Christopher Koch	Lost Voices	Finalist
University of Queensland Non-Fiction Book Award	Kristina Olsson	Boy, Lost	Winner
University of Queensland Non-Fiction Book Award	Richard Gill	Give Me Excess of It	Finalist
University of Queensland Non-Fiction Book Award	Paul Ham	Sandakan	Finalist
University of Queensland Non-Fiction Book Award	Jenny Hocking	Gough Whitlam: His Time	Finalist
University of Queensland Non-Fiction Book Award	Kate Richard	Madness: A Memoir	Finalist
University of Southern Queensland History Book Award	Jane Lydon	The Flash of Recognition	Winner
University of Southern Queensland History Book Award	Alison Alexander	The Ambitions of Jane Franklin	Finalist
University of Southern Queensland History Book Award	David Day	Antarctica: A Biography	Finalist
University of Southern Queensland History Book Award	Walter Hamilton	Children of the Occupation	Finalist
University of Southern Queensland History Book Award	Lawrence Bamblett	Our Stories are Our Survival	Finalist
State Library of Queensland Poetry Collection – Judith Wright Calanthe Award	John Kinsella	Jam Tree Gully: Poems	Winner
State Library of Queensland Poetry Collection – Judith Wright Calanthe Award	Stephen Edgar	Eldershaw	Finalist
State Library of Queensland Poetry Collection – Judith Wright Calanthe Award	Paul Hetherington	Haunted Rooms	Finalist
State Library of Queensland Poetry Collection – Judith Wright Calanthe Award	Jennifer Maiden	Liquid Nitrogen	Finalist
State Library of Queensland Poetry Collection – Judith Wright Calanthe Award	Alan Wearne	Prepare the Cabin for Landing	Finalist
Australian Short Story Collection – Steele Rudd Award	Cate Kennedy	Like a House on Fire	Winner
Australian Short Story Collection – Steele Rudd Award	Susan Midalia	An Unknown Sky	Finalist
Australian Short Story Collection – Steele Rudd Award	Jennifer Mills	The Rest is Weight	Finalist
Australian Short Story Collection – Steele Rudd Award	A S Patric	Las Vegas for Vegans	Finalist
Australian Short Story Collection – Steele Rudd Award	Chris Somerville	We Are Not the Same Anymore	Finalist
Griffith University Young Adult Book Award	Jaclyn Moriarty	A Corner of White	Winner
Griffith University Young Adult Book Award	Andrew McGahan	Ship Kings: The Voyage of the Unquiet Ice	Finalist
Griffith University Young Adult Book Award	Maureen McCarthy	The Convent	Finalist
Griffith University Young Adult Book Award	Vikki Wakefield	Friday Brown	Finalist
Griffith University Young Adult Book Award	Fiona Wood	Wildlife	Finalist
Children's Book Award	Narelle Oliver	Don't Let a Spoonbill in the Kitchen!	Winner
Children's Book Award	Jackie French	Pennies for Hitler	Finalist
Children's Book Award	Jane Godwin	Today We Have No Plans	Finalist
Children's Book Award	Steven Herrick	Pookie Aleera is Not My Boyfriend	Finalist
Children's Book Award	Margaret Wild	The Treasure Box	Finalist
Gadens Feature Film Script Award	Craig Monahan and Alison Nisselle	Healing	Winner
Emerging Queensland Author – Manuscript Award	Rebecca Jessen	Gap	Winner
Emerging Queensland Author – Manuscript Award	Jarryd Luke	Cockscrew Section	Finalist
Emerging Queensland Author – Manuscript Award	Cass Moriarty	The Promise Seed	Finalist
Unpublished Indigenous Writer – David Unaipon Award	Ellen van Neerven	Heat and Light	Winner
Unpublished Indigenous Writer – David Unaipon Award	Martin Doyle	Sugar Shed Road	Finalist
Unpublished Indigenous Writer – David Unaipon Award	Adrian Stanley	Could Be Worse	Finalist
Unpublished Indigenous Writer – David Unaipon Award	Ellen van Neerven	Hard	Finalist
Unpublished Indigenous Writer – David Unaipon Award	Dorothy Williams-Kemp	My Journey that May Never End	Finalist

=== 2012 ===
List of 2012 Queensland Literary Awards Recipients
Category	Author	Title	Result
Fiction Book Award	Frank Moorhouse	Cold Light	Winner
Fiction Book Award	Peter Carey	The Chemistry of Tears	Finalist
Fiction Book Award	Anna Funder	All That I am	Finalist
Fiction Book Award	Kate Grenville	Sarah Thornhill	Finalist
Fiction Book Award	Alex Miller	Autumn Laing	Finalist
Non-Fiction Book Award	Robin De Crespigny	The People Smuggler	Winner
Non-Fiction Book Award	Jane Gleeson-White	Double Entry	Finalist
Non-Fiction Book Award	Patrick Holland	Riding the Trains in Japan	Finalist
Non-Fiction Book Award	William McInnes & Sarah Watt	Worse Things Happen at Sea	Finalist
Non-Fiction Book Award	Alice Pung	Her Father's Daughter	Finalist
History Book Award	Bill Gammage	The Biggest Estate on Earth: How Aborigines Made Australia	Winner
History Book Award	Robyn Arianrhod	Seduced by Logic	Finalist
History Book Award	James Boyce	1835: The Founding of Melbourne and the Conquest of Australia	Finalist
History Book Award	Nicole Moore	The Censor's Library	Finalist
Literary or Media Work Advancing Public Debate – Harry Williams Award	George Megalogenis	The Australian Moment: How We Were Made For These Times	Winner
Literary or Media Work Advancing Public Debate – Harry Williams Award	Paul Cleary	Too Much Luck: The Mining Boom and Australia's Future	Finalist
Literary or Media Work Advancing Public Debate – Harry Williams Award	Michael Weley	There Goes the Neighbourhood	Finalist
Science Writers Award	Rob Brooks	Sex, Genes & Rock 'n' Roll	Winner
Science Writers Award	Robyn Arianrhod	Seduced by Logic	Finalist
Science Writers Award	Frank Bowden	Gone Viral	Finalist
Science Writers Award	Richard Smith	Australia: The Time Traveller’s Guide	Finalist
Poetry Collection – Judith Wright Calanthe Award	Peter Rose	Crimson Crop	Winner
Poetry Collection – Judith Wright Calanthe Award	Anthony Lawrence	The Welfare of My Enemy	Finalist
Poetry Collection – Judith Wright Calanthe Award	David McCooey	Outside	Finalist
Poetry Collection – Judith Wright Calanthe Award	Rhyll McMaster	Late Night Shopping	Finalist
Poetry Collection – Judith Wright Calanthe Award	Simon West	The Yellow Gum’s Conversion	Finalist
Australian Short Story Collection – Steele Rudd Award	Janette Turner Hospital	Turbulence	Winner
Australian Short Story Collection – Steele Rudd Award	Rodney Hall	Silence	Finalist
Australian Short Story Collection – Steele Rudd Award	Marion Halligan	Shooting the Fox	Finalist
Australian Short Story Collection – Steele Rudd Award	John Kinsella	In the Shade of the Shady Tree	Finalist
Australian Short Story Collection – Steele Rudd Award	Ryan O'Neill	The Weight of a Human Heart	Finalist
Young Adult Book Award	Neil Grant	The Ink Bridge	Winner
Young Adult Book Award	Kirsty Eagar	Night Beach	Finalist
Young Adult Book Award	Judith Clarke	Three Summers	Finalist
Young Adult Book Award	Margo Lanagan	Sea Hearts	Finalist
Young Adult Book Award	Vikki Wakefield	All I Ever Wanted	Finalist
Children's Book Award	Briony Stewart	Kumiko and the Shadow Catchers	Winner
Children's Book Award	Pamela Rushby	The Horses Didn’t Come Home	Finalist
Children's Book Award	John Flanagan	Brotherband 1: The Outcasts	Finalist
Children's Book Award	Libby Gleeson & Freya Blackwood	Look a Book!	Finalist
Children's Book Award	Elizabeth Honey	Ten Blue Wrens	Finalist
Film Script Award	Louise Fox	Dead Europe	Winner
Film Script Award	Miro Bilbra	Being Venice	Finalist
Film Script Award	Shane Armstrong & S P Krauss	Rarer Monsters	Finalist
Film Script Award	Brendan Cowell	Save Your Legs	Finalist
Emerging Queensland Author – Manuscript Award	Catherine Titasey	Island of the Unexpected	Winner
Emerging Queensland Author – Manuscript Award	Aaron Smibert	Scratches on the Surface	Finalist
Emerging Queensland Author – Manuscript Award	Luke Thomas	Home Mechanics	Finalist
Emerging Queensland Author – Manuscript Award	Ariella Van Luyn	Hidden Objects	Finalist
Unpublished Indigenous Writer – David Unaipon Award	Siv Parker	Story	Winner
Unpublished Indigenous Writer – David Unaipon Award	Ellen van Neerven-Currie	Hard	Finalist
Unpublished Indigenous Writer – David Unaipon Award	Dorothy Williams-Kemp	My Journey that May Never End	Finalist
Drama Script (Stage) Award	Angela Betzien	War Crimes	Winner
Drama Script (Stage) Award	Wayne Blair	Bloodland	Finalist
Drama Script (Stage) Award	Patricia Cornelius	Taxi	Finalist
Drama Script (Stage) Award	Rita Kalnejais	Baby Teeth	Finalist
Drama Script (Stage) Award	Lally Katz	A Golem Story	Finalist
Television Script Award	Sue Smith	Mabo	Winner
Television Script Award	Blake Ayshford	The Straits: ‘Yawor – My Lovely’, episode 3	Finalist
Television Script Award	Brendan Cowell	The Slap: ‘Harry’, episode 3	Finalist
Television Script Award	Anthony Mullins	Strange Calls: ‘Phantom’, episode 3	Finalist
Television Script Award	Liz Doran	Dance Academy: ‘The Prix de Fonteyn’, episode 24	Finalist
