= Matthew Condon =

Australian writer (born 1962)

- Born: Matthew Steven Condon; 1962 (age 63–64); Australia
- Writing career
- Notable awards: OAM
- Website: www.matthewcondon.com

Matthew Condon OAM (born 1962) is a prize-winning Australian writer and journalist.

== Biography ==
Educated at the University of Queensland and the Goethe Institute, Bremen, Germany, he is the author of ten novels and short story collections, including The Lulu Magnet, A Night at the Pink Poodle, The Motorcycle Cafe, and The Pillow Fight. The Trout Opera, an epic novel that took him more than ten years to write, examines the Australian character through its chief protagonist Wilfred Lampe, a rabbiter and farm hand who spends his entire life in the township of Dalgety, on the banks of the Snowy River. The Sydney Daily Telegraph described the novel as "an instant classic".

In 2013, Condon published Three Crooked Kings, the first part of a biography of former Queensland Police Commissioner Terry Lewis who was charged in 1989 and later jailed on multiple corruption charges. The book was based on Condon's extensive interviews with Lewis and others as well as archival material. The biography is continued in Jacks and Jokers (2014) and All Fall Down (2015).

As of 2019 the author was writing for The Weekend Australian Magazine, the father of three children, based in Byron Bay.

In late 2020 he released a podcast in conjunction with Whooshkaa Studios, "Ghost Gate Road", an investigation into the Queensland criminal Vince O'Dempsey and circumstances surrounding the Whiskey Au Go Go nightclub firebombing in 1973 and the murder of Barbara McCulkin and her two children in 1974.

He was awarded the Medal of the Order of Australia in the 2019 Australia Day Honours for "service to the community".

== Bibliography ==
=== Novels ===
- The Motorcycle Cafe, 1988
- Usher, 1991
- The Ancient Guild of Tycoons, 1994
- A Night at the Pink Poodle, 1995
- The Pillow Fight, 1998
- Lime Bar, 2001
- The Trout Opera, 2007
- Mulligan: On Being a Hack Golfer, 2007

=== Children's fiction ===
- The Tunnel, 1997

=== Short story collections ===
- The Lulu Magnet, 1996

=== Short fiction ===
- "Tattoo" (1996) in Original Sin (ed. Robyn Sheahan)

=== Non-fiction ===
- Brisbane, 2010, written about the city Brisbane, where Matthew grew up.
- Three Crooked Kings, 2013
- Jacks and Jokers, 2014
- All Fall Down, 2015
- Little Fish Are Sweet, 2016 (ISBN 9780702254109)
- The Night Dragon, 2019

=== Edited ===
- Smashed: Australian Drinking Stories, 1996

== Awards and nominations ==
- New South Wales Premier's Literary Awards, Fiction, 1989: shortlisted for The Motorcycle Cafe
- NBC Banjo Awards, NBC Banjo Award for Fiction, 1992: shortlisted for Usher
- NBC Banjo Awards, NBC Banjo Award for Fiction, 1995: shortlisted for The Ancient Guild of Tycoons
- Aurealis Award for Best Fantasy Short Story, 1996: shortlisted for "Tattoo"
- Warana Writers' Awards, Steele Rudd Award, 1996: winner for A Night at the Pink Poodle
- Steele Rudd Award, 1997: joint winner for The Lulu Magnet
- New South Wales Premier's Literary Awards, Christina Stead Prize for Fiction, 2008: shortlisted for The Trout Opera
- Queensland Premier's Literary Awards, Best Fiction Book, 2008: shortlisted for The Trout Opera
- Australia-Asia Literary Award, 2008: longlisted
- John Oxley Library Award, 2013 for Three Crooked Kings
- Medal of the Order of Australia (OAM) 26 January 2019
- Queensland Literary Awards, Queensland Premier's Award for a work of State Significance, 2019: shortlisted for The Night Dragon
