= Thyla =

Thyla may refer to

- Thyla (fiction), a 2011 fiction book by Kate Gordon
- Thyla (portmanteau), a portmanteau for some opossum genera
- Thyla (thylacine), shortening for thylacine
