= Mary-Rose MacColl =

Australian novelist (born 1961)

- Born: 1961 (age 64–65)
- Education: Queensland University of Technology
- Occupation: Novelist
- Website: mary-rosemaccoll.com

Mary-Rose MacColl (born 1961) is an Australian novelist.

MacColl's first novel, No Safe Place, was shortlisted for the 1995 Australian/Vogel Literary Award. In the 2016 Queensland Literary Awards, she won The Courier-Mail People's Choice Queensland Book of the Year Award for her novel Swimming Home. She was nominated again in the 2017 Queensland Literary Awards in The Courier-Mail People's Choice Queensland Book of the Year Award for For a Girl.

MacColl is a graduate in journalism from the Queensland University of Technology. She has contributed two essays to the Griffith Review. Firstly, "The Birth Wars" for the issue, MoneySexPower, and more recently, "The Water of Life" for The Novella Project/Annual Fiction Edition.

At the 2022 Queensland Literary Awards, MacColl was awarded a Queensland Writers Fellowship valued at $15,000.

== Publications ==
- MacColl, Mary-Rose; Brissenden collection (1996), No Safe Place, Crows Nest, Allen & Unwin, ISBN 1864481749
- MacColl, Mary-Rose; Brissenden collection (1999), Angels In The Architecture, Crows Nest, Allen & Unwin, ISBN 978-1-86508-061-1
- MacColl, Mary-Rose (2003), Killing Superman, Crows Nest, Allen & Unwin, ISBN 978-1-86508-998-0
- MacColl, Mary-Rose (2013), In Falling Snow, London, Allison & Busby, ISBN 978-0-7490-1338-7
- MacColl, Mary-Rose (2015), Swimming Home, Crows Nest, New South Wales, Allen & Unwin, ISBN 978-1-925268-36-2
- MacColl, Mary-Rose (2017), For A Girl: A True Story Of Secrets, Motherhood And Hope, Crows Nest, Allen & Unwin, ISBN 978-1-76029-523-3
- MacColl, Mary-Rose (2019), The True Story of Maddie Bright, Crows Nest, New South Wales, Allen & Unwin, 978-1-76029-524-0
