= Queensland Premier's Literary Awards =

Former Australian literary awards 1999–2012

- Description: Australian literary awards for excellence in various genres
- Country: Australia
- Presented by: Premier of Queensland (1999–2012)
- Reward: $225,000 (total across 14 categories)

The Queensland Premier's Literary Awards were an Australian suite of literary awards inaugurated in 1999 and disestablished in 2012. It was one of the most generous suites of literary awards within Australia, with $225,000 in prize money across 14 categories with prizes up to $25,000 in some categories. The awards upon their establishment incorporated a number of pre-existing awards including the Steele Rudd Award for the best Australian collection of new short fiction and the David Unaipon Award for unpublished Indigenous writing.

The awards were established by Peter Beattie, the then Premier of Queensland in 1999 and abolished by Premier Campbell Newman, shortly after winning the 2012 Queensland state election.

In response, the Queensland writing community established the Queensland Literary Awards to ensure the Awards continued in some form. The judging panels remained largely the same, and University of Queensland Press committed to continue to publish the winners of the Emerging Queensland Author Manuscript Award and the Unpublished Indigenous Writer, David Unaipon Award.

== Fiction Book Award ==
=== Queensland Premier's Award for Fiction ===
Year	Title	Author	Ref
1999	Fredy Neptune: A Novel in Verse	Les Murray	
2000	Drylands	Thea Astley	
2001	True History of the Kelly Gang	Peter Carey	
2002	The Volcano	Venero Armanno	
2003	Due Preparations for the Plague	Janette Turner Hospital	
2004	Elizabeth Costello	J. M. Coetzee	
2005	The Turning	Tim Winton	
2006	The Garden Book	Brian Castro	
2007	Carpentaria	Alexis Wright	
2008	The Spare Room	Helen Garner	
2009	Wanting	Richard Flanagan	
2010	Summertime	J. M. Coetzee	
2011	Reading Madame Bovary	Amanda Lohrey	

=== Queensland Premier's Literary Award for Best Fiction Book ===
Year	Title	Author	Ref
2012	Cold Light	Frank Moorhouse	
2013	Mullumbimby	Melissa Lucashenko	
2014	The Narrow Road to the Deep North	Richard Flanagan	
2015	The Golden Age	Joan London	
2016	Between a Wolf and a Dog	Georgia Blain	
2017	The Birdman's Wife	Melissa Ashley	
2018	Taboo	Kim Scott	
2019	Exploded View	Carrie Tiffany	
2020	Stone Sky Gold Mountain	Mirandi Riwoe	
2021	Song of the Crocodile	Nardi Simpson	
2022	The Other Half of You	Michael Mohammed Ahmad (Editor)	
2023	Praiseworthy	Alexis Wright	
2024	The Great Undoing	Sharlene Allsopp	

== Emerging Queensland Author – Manuscript Award ==
- 2011 The Beloved, Annah Faulkner
- 2010 RPM, Noel Mengel
- 2009 No Award. The prize was shared between four shortlisted authors: Inga Simpson, Rachel Claire, Chris Somerville and Pamela Douglas. Extracts from the shortlisted works were published in the 09:05 issue of Perilous Adventures: The Writer's Magazine.
- 2008 Omega Park by Amy Vought Barker
- 2007 Life in the Bus Lane by Ian Commins
- 2006 The Anatomy of Wings by Karen Foxlee
- 2005 The Long Road of the Junkmailer by Patrick Holland
- 2004 An Accidental Terrorist by Steven Lang
- 2003 The Kingdom Where Nobody Dies by Kimberley Starr
- 2002 The Lambing Flat by Nerida Newton
- 2001 Mama Kuma: One Woman, Two Cultures by Deborah Carlyon
- 2000 The Bone Flute by Nike Bourke
- 1999 Shoelaces by Jillian Watkinson

== Unpublished Indigenous Writer – The David Unaipon Award ==
- 2025 Finding Billy Brown, E.M. Crismani
- 2024 Native Rage, Dominic Guerrera
- 2023 To Give Them a Voice (published as Two Tongues), Maria van Neerven
- 2022 Always Will Be, Mykaela Saunders
- 2021 Mekauwe=Tears Volume #1 (Notes For Song) 1970-2020, Ngankiburka-mekauwe (Senior Woman of Water) Georgina Williams
- 2020 The Space Between the Paperbark, Jazz Money
- 2018 The Making of Ruby Champion, Kirstie Parker
- 2017 Mirrored Pieces, Lisa Fuller
- 2016 Dancing Home, Paul Collis
- 2015 The First Octoroon or Report of an Experimental Child, Andrew Booth
- 2014 It’s Not Just Black and White, Lesley and Tammy Williams
- 2013 Heat and Light, Ellen van Neerven
- 2011 Mazin Grace, Dylan Coleman
- 2010 Purple Threads, Jeanine Leane
- 2009 The Boundary by Nicole Watson
- 2008 Every Secret Thing by Marie Munkara
- 2007 Skin Painting by Elizabeth Eileen Hodgson
- 2006 Me, Antman and Fleabag by Gayle Kennedy
- 2005 Anonymous Premonition by Yvette Holt
- 2004 Dust on Waterglass by Tara June Winch (published as Swallow the Air)
- 2003 Whispers of This Wik Woman by Fiona Doyle
- 2002 Home by Larissa Behrendt
- 2001 The Mish by Robert Lowe
- 2000 Bitin' Back by Vivienne Cleven
- 1999 Of Muse, Meandering and Midnight by Samuel Wagan Watson
- 1998 Is That You Ruthie? by Ruth Hegarty
- 1997 When Darkness Falls by John Bodey
- 1996 Black Angels Red Blood by Steven McCarthy
- 1995 Warrigal's Way by Warrigal Anderson
- 1994 The Sausage Tree by Valda Gee and Rosalie Medcraft
- 1993 Bridge of Triangles by John Muk Muk Burke
- 1992 Sweet Water, Stolen Land by Philip McLaren
- 1991 Broken Dreams by Bill Dodd
- 1990 Caprice: A Stockman's Daughter by Doris Pilkington Garimara
- 1989 Holocaust Island by Graeme Dixon

== Non-Fiction Book Award ==
- 2011 An Eye for Eternity: The Life of Manning Clark by Mark McKenna
- 2010 The Blue Plateau: A Landscape Memoir, Mark Tredinnick
- 2009 The Tall Man: Death and Life on Palm Island by Chloe Hooper
- 2008 Muck by Craig Sherborne
- 2007 Slicing the Silence: Voyaging to Antarctica by Professor Tom Griffiths
- 2006 Packer's Lunch by Neil Chenoweth
- 2005 Papunya: A Place Made After the Story by Geoffrey Bardon and James Bardon
- 2004 A Death in Brazil by Peter Robb
- 2003 Meeting of the Waters by Margaret Simons
- 2002 The Boyds: A Family Biography by Brenda Niall
- 2001 A Fine and Private Place by Brian Matthews

== History Book Award – Faculty of Arts, University of Queensland Award ==
- 2011 Northern Voyagers: Australia’s Monsoon Coast in Maritime History, Alan Powell
- 2010 Sydney Harbour: A History, Ian Hoskins
- 2009 Stella Miles Franklin by Jill Roe
- 2008 Drawing the Global Colour Line by Professor Marilyn Lake and Professor Henry Reynolds
- 2007 Iron Kingdom by Christopher Clark
- 2006 Arthur Tange: The Last of the Mandarins by Peter Edwards
- 2005 The Sounds of Slavery: Discovering African History Through Songs, Sermons and Speech by Shane White and Graham White
- 2004 Dancing with Strangers by Inga Clendinnen
- 2003 Mussolini by Professor R. J. B. Bosworth
- 2002 Gallipoli by Les Carlyon
- 2001 The Colonial Earth by Tim Bonyhady
- 2000 John Curtin: A Life by David Day
- 1999 The Sky Travellers by Bill Gammage

=== Queensland Premier's Children's Book Award – Mary Ryan's Award ===
Year	Title	Author	Ref
1999	Unseen	Paul Jennings	
2000	The Family Tree	Jane Godwin	
2001	Fox	Margaret Wild and Ron Brooks	
2002	Blat Magic	Michael Stephens	
2003	Rain May and Captain Daniel	Catherine Bateson	
2004	Dragonkeeper	Carole Wilkinson	
2005	Camel Rider	Prue Mason	
2006	The Slightly Bruised Glory of Cedar B. Hartley	Martine Murray	
2007	Layla Queen of Hearts	Glenda Millard	
2008	The Peasant Prince	Li Cunxin and Anne Spudvilas	
2009	Little Blue	Gaye Chapman	
2010	Toppling	Sally Murphy	
2011	Just a Dog	Michael Gerard Bauer	

== Young Adult Book Award ==
- 2011 Being Here by Barry Jonsberg
- 2010 Drink the Air by Richard Yaxley
- 2009 A Small Free Kiss in the Dark by Glenda Millard
- 2008 Requiem for a Beast by Matt Ottley
- 2007 One Whole and Perfect Day by Judith Clarke
- 2006 The Red Shoe by Ursula Dubosarsky
- 2005 Secret Scribbled Notebooks by Joanne Horniman
- 2004 How to Make a Bird by Martine Murray
- 2003 Boys of Blood and Bone by David Metzenthen
- 2002 When Dogs Cry by Markus Zusak

== Science Writers – Department of State Development, Trade and Innovation Award ==
- 2011 Voyage to the Planets – Episodes 1, 2 and 3 – Mars, Jupiter and Saturn, Richard Smith
- 2010 Catching Cancer, Sonya Pemberton
- 2009 Pasteur's Gambit: Louis Pasteur, the Australasian Rabbit Plague and a Ten Million Dollar Prize by Stephen Dando-Collins
- 2008 Why is Uranus Upside Down? (and other Questions about the Universe) by Professor Fred Watson
- 2007 Crude by Richard Smith
- 2006 Good Health in the 21st Century by Carole Hungerford
- 2005 Stem Cells by Elizabeth Finkel
- 2004 Genius of Junk by Sonya Pemberton

== Poetry Collection – Arts Queensland Judith Wright Calanthe Award ==
- 2021 Terminally Ill by Ouyang Yu
- 2020 Heide by Pi O
- 2019 Blakwork by Alison Whittaker
- 2018 I Love Poetry by Michael Farrell
- 2017 Fragments by Antigone Kefala
- 2016 Anatomy of Voice by David Musgrave
- 2015 Waiting For the Past by Les Murray
- 2014 Earth Hour by David Malouf
- 2012 Crimson Crop by Peter Rose (poet)
- 2011 Starlight: 150 poems by John Tranter
- 2010 Apocrypha by Peter Boyle
- 2009 The Striped World by Emma Jones
- 2008 Typewriter Music by David Malouf
- 2007 The Passenger by Laurie Duggan
- 2006 The New Arcadia by Professor John Kinsella
- 2005 The Ship by Sarah Day
- 2004 Wolf Notes by Judith Beveridge
- 2001 and dug my fingers in the sand by Brook Emery

== Australian Short Story Collection – Arts Queensland Steele Rudd Award ==
Year	Title	Author	Ref
2004	Mahjar	Eva Sallis	
2005	Vincenzo's Garden	John Clanchy	
2006	A Funny Thing Happened at 27 000 Feet	Craig Cormick	
2007	Every Move You Make	David Malouf	
2008	Someone Else	John Hughes	
2009	The Boat	Nam Le	
2010	Little White Slips	Karen Hitchcock	
2011	Reading Madame Bovary	Amanda Lohrey	
2012	Forecast: Turbulence	Janette Turner Hospital	
2013	Like a House on Fire	Cate Kennedy	
2014	Only the Animals	Ceridwen Dovey	
2015	Merciless Gods	Christos Tsiolkas	
2016	A Few Days in the Country and Other Stories	Elizabeth Harrower	
2016	The High Places	Fiona McFarlane	
2017	The Circle and the Equator	Kyra Giorgi	
2018	Pulse Points	Jennifer Down	
2019	Zebra	Debra Adelaide	
2020	Lucky Ticket	Joey Bui	
2021	Ordinary Matter	Laura Elvery	

== Literary Work Advancing Public Debate – the Harry Williams Award ==
- 2012 The Australian Moment, George Megalogenis
- 2011 Into the Woods: The Battle for Tasmania's Forests, Anna Krien
- 2010 Requiem for a Species: Why we resist the truth about climate change, Clive Hamilton
- 2009 Code of Silence by Sarah Ferguson
- 2008 In My Shoes by Quentin McDermott and Steve Taylor
- 2007 Jonestown by Chris Masters
- 2006 Asbestos House by Gideon Haigh
- 2005 Sickness in the System by Hedley Thomas
- 2004 The History Wars by Stuart Macintyre and Anna Clark
- 2003 Dark Victory by David Marr and Marian Wilkinson
- 2002 In Denial: The Stolen Generations and the Right by Robert Manne and Reconciliation: A Journey by Michael Gordon
- 2001 Borderline: Australia's Treatment of Refugees and Asylum Seekers by Peter Mares and Dossier Inside the ABC by David Fagan and Dossier Team
- 2000 Why Weren't We Told by Henry Reynolds
- 1999 The Moment the Laughter Died by Tony Koch

== Film Script – the Pacific Film and Television Commission Award ==
- 2011 The Hunter by Alice Addison
- 2010 South Solitary by Shirley Barrett
- 2009 Mary and Max by Adam Elliot
- 2008 Prime Mover by David Caesar
- 2007 Lake Mungo by Joel Anderson
- 2006 Ten Canoes by Rolf de Heer
- 2005 Little Fish by Jacquelin Perske
- 2004 Look Both Ways by Sarah Watt
- 2003 Japanese Story by Alison Tilson
- 2002 The Tracker by Rolf de Heer
- 2001 Rabbit-Proof Fence by Christine Olsen
- 2000 Praise by Andrew McGahan
- 1999 Two Hands by Gregor Jordan

== Television Script – QUT Creative Industries Award ==
- 2011 Paper Giants: The Birth of Cleo – Part 2 by Christopher Lee
- 2010 Sisters of War by John Misto
- 2009 False Witness by Peter Gawler
- 2008 Underbelly, Episode 7 – Wise Monkeys by Felicity Packard
- 2007 Bastard Boys by Sue Smith
- 2006 Unfolding Florence by Katherine Thomson
- 2005 RAN: Remote Area Nurse – Episode 5 – Blue Hawaii by Sue Smith
- 2004 The Cooks – Episode 12, Series 1 – Honey and Wounds by Blake Ayshford

== Drama Script (Stage) Award ==
- 2012/2013 Trollop by Maxine Mellor
- 2011 Life Without Me by Daniel Keene
- 2009 Realism by Paul Galloway
- 2008 When the Rain Stops Falling by Andrew Bovell
- 2007 Embers by Campion Decent
- 2006 Mrs Petrov's Shoe by Noelle Janaczewska
- 2005 Black Hands/Dead Section by Van Badham
- 2004 Run Rabbit Run by Alana Valentine
- 2003 Last Cab to Darwin by Reg Cribb
- 2002 Old Masters by Beatrix Christian
- 2001 Meat Party by Duong Le Quy
- 2000 Box the Pony by Leah Purcell and Scott Rankin
- 1999 Who's Afraid of the Working Class by Andrew Bovell, Melissa Reeves, Patricia Cornelius and Christos Tsiolkas

== Encouragement and Development Prize ==
- 2005 The Comfort of Figs by Simon Cleary
