= Narelle Oliver =

Australian artist, print maker and children's author-illustrator

- Born: 25 February 1960 Toowoomba, Queensland, Australia
- Died: 5 October 2016 (aged 56) Brisbane, Queensland, Australia
- Occupation: Author, illustrator, printmaker, educator
- Genre: Children's literature
- Years active: 1989–2016
- Notable works: The Hunt; Sand Swimmers; Home
- Notable awards: CBCA Book of the Year (1996); NSW Premier’s Literary Award (2007); Queensland Literary Award (2013)

Narelle Oliver (1960 - 2016) was an Australian artist, print maker and award-winning children's author-illustrator.

== Early life ==
Narelle Oliver was born on 25 February 1960 and grew up in Toowoomba in south east Queensland.

== Career ==
Oliver majored in design and printmaking while studying for a Bachelor of Education degree. She began her career teaching at the Queensland School for the Deaf.

Oliver was an educator and a committed environmentalist. As an illustrator, Oliver combined linocut, watercolour, pastels, collage and digitally-enhanced photographs in her work. She used many environmental themes drawing on the flora and fauna of Australia.

Oliver's first book, Leaf Tail, was published in 1989.

== Works ==
- Oliver, Narelle (1989), Leaf Tail, McCulloch Publishing, ISBN 978-0-949646-97-2
- — (1991), High above the sea, Jam Roll Press, ISBN 978-1-875491-04-9
- — (1993), The best beak in Boonaroo Bay, Lothian, ISBN 978-0-85091-671-3
- — (1995), The hunt, Lothian Books, ISBN 978-5-86793-139-1
- — (1996), The Well, Lothian Books, ISBN 0-85091-735-2
- — (1999), Sand swimmers : the secret life of Australia's dead heart, Lothian, ISBN 978-0-85091-768-0
- — (2001), Baby bilby, where do you sleep?, Lothian, ISBN 978-0-7344-0285-1
- — (2003), The very blue thingamajig, Norwood, S. Aust. An Omnibus Book from Scholastic Australia, ISBN 978-1-86291-527-5
- — (2006), Home, Scholastic Australia, ISBN 978-1-86291-668-5
- — (2009), Fox and fine feathers, Omnibus Books, ISBN 978-1-86291-806-1
- — (2013), Don't let a spoonbill in the kitchen!, Parkside, SA Omnibus Books, ISBN 978-1-86291-960-0

== Honours and awards ==
- 1996 Children's Book Council of Australia Book of the Year Award Winner for The Hunt
- 1999 Royal Zoological Society of NSW Whitley Award - Best Book for Older Readers for Sand Swimmers: The Secret Life of Australia's Dead Heart
- 2000 joint winner The Wilderness Society Environment Award for Children's Literature — Picture Book for Sand Swimmers: The Secret Life of Australia's Dead Heart
- 2007 New South Wales Premier's Literary Awards — Patricia Wrightson Prize for Children's Books for Home
- 2013 Queensland Literary Awards — Children's Book Award for Don't let a spoonbill in the kitchen

== Personal life ==
Oliver lived in Brisbane with her husband Greg and their children Jessie and Liam. She died on 5 October 2016.
