= Susan Johnson (Australian author) =

Australian author

Susan Johnson (born 1956) is an Australian author of literary fiction, memoir, short stories and essays. She has been a full-time writer since 1985, with occasional stints of journalism at Australian newspapers, journals and magazines.

== Biography ==
Johnson was born in 1956, in Brisbane, Queensland. She spent her childhood in Sydney, attending St Ives High School In New South Wales and then Nambour High School and Clayfield College in Queensland. She was formerly Adjunct Professor of Creative Writing, Queensland University of Technology.

At the National Library of Australia Johnson delivered the 2011 Ray Mathew Lecture entitled "Prodigal Daughter", in which she explored the topic of expatriate Australian women authors, her ambivalent relationship to Australia, and Australia's attitude towards its artists.

Susan Johnson was on the program to appear in 3 events at the 2017 Brisbane Writers Festival in Brisbane, Queensland, Australia.

== Bibliography ==
- Latitudes: New Writing From The North, University of Queensland Press, 1986. ISBN 0-7022-2021-3
- Messages from Chaos Harper and Row, 1987. ISBN 0-06-312091-7
- Flying Lessons, Heinemann 1990. ISBN 0-85561-344-0
- A Big Life, MacMillan, 1993. ISBN 0-7329-0772-1
- Women Love Sex, Vintage, 1996. ISBN 0-09-183255-1
- A Better Woman: A Memoir Random House, 1999. ISBN 0-09-183551-8
- The Broken Book, Allan & Unwin, 2005. ISBN 1-74114-351-9
- Life in Seven Mistakes, Heinemann, 2008. ISBN 978-1-86325-615-5
- On Beauty, Melbourne University Press, 2009. ISBN 978-0-522-85602-6
- "The prodigal daughter : the 2011 Ray Mathew Lecture". The National Library Magazine. 3 (4): 18–20. December 2011.
- My Hundred Lovers, Allen & Unwin, 2012. ISBN 9781741756357
- The Landing, Allen & Unwin, 2015. ISBN 9781760113933
- "Outside manners", pp. 206–215, in: Destroying the joint, edited by Jane Caro, Read How You Want (2015, ISBN 9781459687295).
- From Where I Fell, Allen & Unwin, 2021. ISBN 9781760876555
- Aphrodite’s Breath, Allen & Unwin, 2023. ISBN 9781760876562

== Honors and awards ==
- 1985: Australia Council Literature Board New Writers Grant.
- 1989: Nancy Keesing Fellowship at Cite Internationale des Arts in Paris.

Voss Literary Prize
From Where I Fell, 2022, shortlisted
APA Book Design Award Best Designed Literary Fiction Book Award
The Broken Book, 2006, shortlisted
Association for the Study of Australian Literature ALS Gold Medal
The Broken Book, 2006, shortlisted
CAL (Copyright Agency Limited) Waverley Library Award for Literature
The Broken Book, 2006, shortlisted
Commonwealth Writers' Prize
The Broken Book, 2006, shortlisted
International Dublin Literary Award
The Broken Book, longlisted 2006.
The Miles Franklin Award
The Broken Book, longlisted 2005
National Biography Award
A Better Woman, shortlisted 1999.
National Book Council Banjo Award
A Big Life, shortlisted 1994.
Nita Kibble Literary Award
The Broken Book, shortlisted 2006
Queensland Premier's Literary Awards Fiction Prize
The Broken Book, shortlisted 2006
Vance Palmer Prize for Fiction Victorian Premier's Literary Awards
Flying Lessons shortlisted, 1991

A Big Life, shortlisted 1994
