= B. R. Dionysius =

Australian poet, editor and educator

- Occupation: Poet
- Spouse: Melissa Ashley
- Website: brdionysius.com

B. R. Dionysius (born 1969) is an Australian poet, editor and educator. His poems have appeared in numerous national and international anthologies, journals, magazines, newspapers and other periodicals.

== Education and work ==
He was born in Dalby, Queensland. Dionysius received a Bachelor of Education (Secondary) Grad Entry and then earned an M.Phil. (Creative Writing) from the University of Queensland after.

He served as Director of Fringe Arts Collective Inc., a not-for-profit literary collective that organised the Brisbane Writers Fringe Festival (1993–1996) and a precursor (1997–2001) to the modern incarnation of the Queensland Poetry Festival. He was also founding Director of that early iteration.

== Personal life ==
He lives in Brisbane, Queensland, is married to the writer Melissa Ashley and has two daughters, Rhiannon and Sylvie, and a son, Theo.

== Awards ==
In 1999, he was awarded a New Work Grant from the Literature Fund of the Australia Council to write the verse novel, Universal Andalusia. Universal Andalusia was shortlisted for the C. J. Dennis Prize for Poetry in 2006. He won the 2009 Max Harris Poetry Award. A chapbook, The Negativity Bin was published by PressPress in 2010. The Curious Noise of History was released by Picaro Press in 2011. He also won the Whitmore Press Manuscript Prize, 2011.

- Max Harris Poetry Award, 2009
- Whitmore Press Manuscript Prize, 2011
- Queensland Writers Fellowship, 2023

== Bibliography ==
- The Barflies' Chorus (1995)
- Fatherlands (2000)
- Bacchanalia (2002)
- Universal Andalusia (2006). ISBN 9780957941120.
- The Negativity Bin (2010)
- The Curious Noise of History and Other Poems (2011)
- Bowra (2013)
- Weranga (2013)
- Critical State (2022)
