= Elizabeth Jolley Short Story Prize =

The ABR Elizabeth Jolley Short Story Prize is an annual short fiction competition run by the Australian Book Review. The Prize, with total prize money of AU$12,500 and "generating over a thousand new stories each year", is "hotly contested" and considered "one of Australia's most lucrative prizes for an original short story" on the Australian literary calendar.

== History ==
The Prize was originally known as the ABR Short Story Competition when it was established in 2010; however, the ABR renamed the award "in honour of Elizabeth Jolley, and first awarded it under its new name, the ABR Elizabeth Jolley Short Story Prize, in 2011".

The Prize accepts submissions from authors worldwide, however stories must be by a single author and written in English.

== Winners ==
- 2010: Maria Takolander: "A Roānkin Philosophy of Poetry"
- 2011: Carrie Tiffany: "Before He Left the Family", and Gregory Day: "The Neighbour's Beans"
- 2012: Sue Hurley: "Patterns in Nature"
- 2013: Michelle Michau-Crawford: "Leaving Elvis"
- 2014: Jennifer Down: "Aokigahara"
- 2015: Rob Magnuson Smith: "The Elector of Nossnearly"
- 2016: Josephine Rowe: "Glisk"
- 2017: Eliza Robertson: "Pheidippides"
- 2018: Madelaine Lucas: "Ruins"
- 2019: Sonja Dechian: "The Point-Blank Murder"
- 2020: Mykaela Saunders: "River Story"
- 2021: Camilla Chaudhary: "The Enemy, Asyndeton"
- 2022: Tracy Ellis: "Natural Wonder"
- 2023: Rowan Heath: "The Mannequin"
- 2024: Jill Van Epps: "Pornwald"
- 2025: Tara Sharman: "Shelling"
- 2026: Laura Elvery: "C.Q.D."
