= Yumna Kassab =

Australian novelist

- Education: Macquarie University
- Occupation: Novelist
- Writing career
- Notable awards: Parramatta Laureate in Literature, 2024

Yumna Kassab is an Australian novelist. She was appointed the inaugural Parramatta Laureate in Literature for 2024.

== Career ==
Yumna Kassab was born and grew up at Parramatta. She spent two years of her childhood in Lebanon with her family. After studying at Macquarie University she worked as a high school teacher.

Her first book, The House of Youssef, published in 2019, contains short stories of Lebanese migrants living in Western Sydney. Reviewing the book for ArtsHub, Georgia Brough described it as a "stunning, succinct collection of short fiction".

In December 2023 Kassab was announced as the inaugural Parramatta Laureate in Literature.

== Awards ==
- The House of Youssef
  - Stella Prize, longlisted 2020
  - Glenda Adams Award for New Writing, New South Wales Premier's Literary Awards, shortlisted 2020
  - Steele Rudd Award, Queensland Literary Awards, shortlisted 2020
  - Readings Prize for New Australian Fiction, shortlisted 2020
  - Victorian Premier's Prize for Fiction, shortlisted 2020
- Australiana
  - Fiction Book Award, Queensland Literary Awards, shortlisted 2022
- The Lovers
  - Victorian Premier's Prize for Fiction, shortlisted 2023
  - Miles Franklin Literary Award, shortlisted 2023
  - Fiction, Prime Minister's Literary Awards, shortlisted 2023
- Politica
  - Fiction Book Award, Queensland Literary Awards, shortlisted 2024
  - Miles Franklin Literary Award, longlisted 2025

== Publications ==
- Kassab, Yumna (2019). The House of Youssef. Giramondo. ISBN 9781925818192.
- —— (2022). Australiana. Ultimo Press. ISBN 9781761150609.
- —— (2022). The Lovers. Ultimo Press. ISBN 9781761150623.
- —— (2024). Politica. Artarmon: Giramondo. ISBN 9781761152009.
- —— (2026). Parramatta: A Dictionary of Place and Memory. Artarmon: Giramondo. ISBN 9781923106741.
