= Graeme Dixon =

Australian Noongar poet

Graeme Dixon (29 September 1955 – 17 September 2010) was a Noongar poet. He was born in Perth, Western Australia, his mother is a Noongar from Katanning and his father an English migrant orphan who grew up at Fairbridge Farm.

He is a member of the Stolen Generation; he was taken from his family at the age of three and spent several years at Sister Kate's. Between the ages of ten and fourteen years he lived in a Salvation Army boys' home. From the age of sixteen he spent nine years in Fremantle Prison. During that time he began to write poetry.

After his release he stayed out of jail, but fell into problems with alcohol and drugs. He then met and married Sharmaine, who encouraged him to publish his poetry and further his education. At the age of 27, Dixon began tertiary studies and completed a course at Curtin University in politics, communications and Aboriginal studies.

In 1989 his first published book of poems Holocaust Island won the inaugural David Unaipon Award, part of the Queensland Premier's Literary Awards.

== Bibliography ==
Holocaust Island St Lucia : University of Queensland Press, 1990.

Holocaust Revisited : Killing Time Crawley : School of Indigenous Studies, University of Western Australia, 2003.

Contributed to Echoes of the Past: Sister Kate’s Home Revisited, University of Western Australia, 2002.
