= Kyra Giorgi =

Australian author and historian (born 1977)

Kyra Giorgi (born 1977) is an Australian author and historian.

== Early life and career ==
Kyra Giorgi was born in Perth Western Australia—her mother is the novelist Gail Jones. Giorgi took her PhD in history from La Trobe University in 2012 with the thesis - Saudade, lítost, hüzün: cultural identity and melancholic fatalism on the margins of Europe.

The Circle and the Equator was her first book of fiction, and was Highly Commended in the inaugural Dorothy Hewett Award for an Unpublished Manuscript.

== Awards ==
At the 2017 Queensland Literary Awards, her work The Circle and the Equator won the University of Southern Queensland Australian Short Story Collection - Steele Rudd Award.

== Works ==
- Giorgi, Kyra (2014), Emotions, Language and Identity on the Margins of Europe, Palgrave Macmillan UK : Imprint: Palgrave Macmillan, ISBN 978-1-349-48700-4
- Giorgi, Kyra (2017), The Circle and the Equator, UWA Publishing, ISBN 978-1-74258-923-7
