= Jeff Maynard =

Australian author and historian

- Born: Australia
- Education: Swinburne University (MA in Writing); AFTRS (Postgraduate in Scriptwriting and Directing)
- Occupations: Author, documentary maker, historian
- Notable work: Antarctica's Lost Aviator, The Frontier Below
- Website: jeffmaynard.net

Jeff Maynard is an Australian author, documentary maker, and historian known for his extensive research into little-known aspects of Australia's history. His work focuses on polar exploration, aviation history, and underwater discovery. He is a former President of the Historical Diving Society: Australia-Pacific and a member of the Explorers Club of New York.

== Education ==
Maynard holds a Master of Arts in Writing from Swinburne University of Technology (2008) and a Post-Graduate Degree in Scriptwriting and Directing from AFTRS (2009).

== Career ==
Maynard began diving in 1987 and developed a keen interest in the history of diving. In 1992, he started researching the World War II-era recovery of eight tons of gold from the RMS Niagara. He located surviving crew members and discovered lost film footage of the salvage operation. His books on diving history include The Frontier Below, Niagara's Gold (1996) and Divers in Time (2002). He has served as the editor of the Historical Diving Society's quarterly magazine, Classic Diver.

Maynard has dedicated years to researching Australian polar explorer Sir Hubert Wilkins. He has authored multiple books on Wilkins, including Wings of Ice (2010), The Unseen Anzac (2015), Antarctica's Lost Aviator (2019), and The Illustrated Sir Hubert Wilkins (2022). His book Crossing Antarctica – The Wyatt Earp Story was announced for publication in 2018. His 2024 book, The Frontier Below, explores historical aspects of deep-sea exploration.

Maynard has written widely for television and contributed articles to international magazines. He was a former editor of Australian Motorcycle News and has maintained a long-standing interest in classic motorcycles. He was also a field editor for Australasian Scuba Diver.

In addition to his writing, Maynard has worked as a presenter on Radio Marinara (3RRR, Melbourne).

== Bibliography ==
- Secrets of RMS Niagara (History Press, London, 2026)
- The Frontier Below (Harper Collins, London, 2024)
- The Illustrated Sir Hubert Wilkins (Netfield Publishing, Melbourne, 2022)
- Antarctica's Lost Aviator (Pegasus Books, New York, 2019)
- The Unseen Anzac (Scribe, Melbourne, 2015)
- Wings of Ice (Random House, Sydney, 2010)
- Divers in Time (Glenmore, Melbourne, 2002)
- Niagara's Gold (Kangaroo Press, Sydney, 1996)
- The Letterbox War of Kamarooka Street (Bacon Town Books, Melbourne, 1992)
