= Robyn Arianrhod =

Australian historian of science

Robyn Arianrhod is an Australian science writer and historian of science known for her works on the predecessors to Albert Einstein, on Émilie du Châtelet and Mary Somerville, and on Thomas Harriot.

== Education ==
In the 1970s, Arianrhod left her honours program in mathematics to join a radical counterculture community, without electricity, running water, or communications. She returned to school, and earned a doctorate in general relativity from Monash University. She remains affiliated with Monash University as an honorary research associate in the mathematical sciences.

== Books ==
Arianrhod's first book, Einstein's Heroes: Imagining the World through the Language of Mathematics (University of Queensland Press and Oxford University Press, 2005; ISBN 9780702234088, ISBN 978-0-19-530890-7, ISBN 978-0-19-518370-2) has little to do with Albert Einstein himself. The titular heroes are James Clerk Maxwell, Michael Faraday, and Isaac Newton, whose portraits Einstein kept. Although the book is broad-ranging in its outline of the development of physics, its central narrative is Maxwell's development of Maxwell's equations for electromagnetism. A broader goal of the book is to communicate the beauty of mathematics and the way that mathematical language has become central to modern physics.

Seduced by Logic: Émilie du Châtelet, Mary Somerville and the Newtonian Revolution (Oxford University Press, 2012; ISBN 978-0-19-993161-3) describes and compares the accomplishments and lives of two women of mathematics separated by a century, Émilie du Châtelet in 18th-century France, and Mary Somerville in 19th-century England. Both women are best known for their popularization of the works of others, Newton's Principia for Du Châtelet and Pierre-Simon Laplace's Traité de mécanique céleste for Somerville, but they had many other accomplishments, and the book keeps their scientific work in the foreground.

Thomas Harriot: A Life in Science (Oxford University Press, 2019; ISBN 978-0-19-027185-5) is biography of 16th-century English polymath Thomas Harriot. It establishes Harriot's contributions to astronomy, optics, physics, cartography, ethnology, and linguistics, which until recently had been little known, in part because of Harriot's failure to publish his discoveries.

Her most recent book is Vector: A Surprising Story of Space, Time, and Mathematical Transformation (University of Chicago Press, 2024; ISBN 978-0-226-82110-8, ISBN 978-0-226-82111-5). It won the General History Prize at the 2025 New South Wales Premier's History Awards.
