= Gary Lonesborough =

Australian writer (born 1995)

- Born: 1995 (age 30–31); Bega, New South Wales, Australia
- Occupation: Novelist
- Writing career
- Genre: Young adult fiction

Gary Lonesborough (born 1995) is an Australian Yuin young adult fiction author. His work addresses Aboriginal identity, sexuality, grief, masculinity, and the experiences of queer Indigenous youth.

He is best known for his debut novel The Boy from the Mish (2021), followed by We Didn't Think It Through (2023), I'm Not Really Here (2025), and Good Young Men (2026).

== Early life ==
Lonesborough was born 1995 in Bega, New South Wales, where he was raised in a large Aboriginal family within the Yuin community. His upbringing in a small regional town was largely influential to the settings and themes of his later fictional works, including rural masculinity, community gossip, and the pressures that are placed on Aboriginal youth.

In his teenage years, Lonesborough experienced cyberbullying and harassment on social media, including anonymous pages that targeted students at his high school. He has described these experiences as what later influenced the emotional landscape of his fictional work I'm Not Really Here.

He later moved to Sydney to study film, where he developed his skills in screenwriting and visual storytelling that continued to influence his writing style.

== Career ==
Lonesborough worked in Aboriginal health, child protection, disability support, and youth justice. Through these roles he was exposed to the challenges that young Aboriginal people face, including systemic racism and intergenerational trauma, he later used these as recurring themes in his fictional works.

Lonesborough's background in film is what shaped his narrative approach, which he describes as "literal and filmic", drawing on visual storytelling techniques to create vivid scenes and emotionally immersive character perspectives.

== Writing ==
Lonesborough's writing focuses on queer Indigenous youth, emotional vulnerability, and the complexities of growing up Aboriginal in regional Australia. His novels often draw on personal experiences, including grief, struggles with body image, and navigating masculinity in sport-orientated communities. His novels are works of contemporary young adult fiction that focus on Aboriginal teenagers, often combining coming-of-age narratives with themes of family, sexuality, grief, racism, and belonging.

His debut novel, The Boy from the Mish_{,} was widely acclaimed for its portrayal of first love and cultural identity. It won Booktopia's Favourite Debut Book Award.

His second novel, We Didn't Think It Through, explores themes of racism, family responsibility, and resilience among Aboriginal youth. It won the Readings Young Adult Prize in 2024.

I'm Not Really Here (2025) has been described as one of Lonesborough's most personal works. He has stated that the protagonist Jonah is "the closest to myself as a character that I've written", reflecting his own experiences growing up as a queer Indigenous teenager. The novel explores themes of grief, identity, and the emotional aftermath of trauma.

His 2026 novel, Good Young Men, has been noted for its portrayal of three Aboriginal teenagers confronting racism, police violence, sexuality, and family trauma. Reviewers have discussed its tension, emotional depth, and messages about authenticity and friendship.

== Themes and reception ==
Lonesborough’s fictional work is recognised for its exploration of grief, identity, sexuality, and the experiences of queer Aboriginal youth. Critics have highlighted his use of emotional vulnerability and personal experience to portray characters who confront trauma, belonging, and self‑acceptance.

His work frequently incorporates autobiographical elements, including cyberbullying, community gossip, and pressures of rural masculinity.

== Awards and honours ==
- Booktopia Favourite Debut Book Award — The Boy from the Mish
- Readings Young Adult Prize (2024) — We Didn’t Think It Through
- Finalist, Prime Minister’s Literary Awards — I’m Not Really Here

== Bibliography ==
- The Boy from the Mish (2021)
- We Didn’t Think It Through (2023)
- I’m Not Really Here (2025)
- Good Young Men (2026)
