= Iain McCalman =

Australian historian and researcher

- Born: 6 November 1947 (age 79); Nyasaland, Africa
- Awards: Fellow of the Royal Historical Society (1992); Fellow of the Academy of the Social Sciences in Australia (1992); Fellow of the Australian Academy of the Humanities (1996); Federation Fellowship (2003); Officer of the Order of Australia (2007)

Academic background
- Education: Australian National University (BA, MA); Monash University (PhD)
- Thesis: A Radical Underworld in London: Thomas Evans, Robert Wedderburn, George Cannon and Their Circle, 1800–35 (1984)

Academic work
- Institutions: University of Sydney; Australian National University
- Doctoral students: Peter Stanley
- Main interests: British and European social history
- Website: http://www.iainmccalman.com/

Iain Duncan McCalman AO FRHS FASSA FAHA (born 6 November 1947) is an Australian historian, social scientist, academic and former Research Professor at the University of Sydney, as well as a prominent multidisciplinary environmental researcher. McCalman was born and raised in Nyasaland (current-day Malawi) before moving to Australia to complete his university degrees in History. He is a specialist in eighteenth-century and early-nineteenth British and European cultural history.

McCalman’s research interests include environmentalism and environmental history, history of low and popular culture, history of science and historiography, particularly in relation to emotion in history and the role of historical re-enactments. He was also President of the Academy of the Humanities from 2001 to 2004, co-founder and co-director of the Sydney Environmental Institute from 2013 to 2018. McCalman was made an Officer of the Order of Australia (AO) in 2007.

== Early life and education ==
McCalman was born in the former British protectorate of Nyasaland on 6 November 1947. He and his sister are descended from Australians who remained in Africa following the Boer War. McCalman’s father worked as a British civil servant in colonial Nyasaland. McCalman reflected on his childhood as part of the colonial system in Africa: “[My father] always told us European colonials were caretakers, not owners, and we'd have to go one day. It really irritated my sister and me. Africa was our home. But he never bought property, always prepared us to leave”.

In 1965, McCalman emigrated to Canberra to study a bachelor of arts with honors in history at the Australian National University (ANU), under Australian historian Manning Clark AC (1915-1991). McCalman also completed his master's degree at ANU before moving to Monash University for his doctorate.

== Career ==
Whilst writing his master’s thesis at the Australian National University, McCalman worked as a tutor at Macquarie University in Sydney from 1972. This was where he began teaching modern history and first met his mentor and fellow historian Jill Roe AO FASSA (1940-2017). By 1994, McCalman had established himself as a note-worthy teacher and was awarded the inaugural Vice-Chancellor’s Award for Teaching Excellence at the ANU.

Upon being elected President of the Australian Academy of the Humanities - a role he served in from 2001 to 2004 - McCalman oriented his agenda towards addressing inequities between how the humanities and the natural sciences were treated in Australia. A major proposal made towards achieving this goal was by “emphasizing the need to foster creativity and innovation by forging cross-disciplinary alliances”. An example of such an interdisciplinary approach includes “addressing social and cultural factors when governments seek to adopt new technologies”.

McCalman’s contributions as an academic also extended beyond the academy as he held several consulting or guest positions in media projects. An example of such includes a segment for ABC Radio National titled “Books that Changed Humanity”, discussing Charles Darwin’s 1859 book “On the Origins of Species”. McCalman was also credited as a consultant and presenter for the 2009 documentary, “Darwin’s Brave New World”, which featured historical re-enactments to accompany a discussion of Charles Darwin’s work on evolution. Additionally, McCalman has contributed to several government projects, particularly in relation to academic and environmental practices. One such contribution was to the Inspiring Australia Report from the Department of Industry, Innovation, Science and Research which aimed to unify and coordinate research into the sciences from a national body.

=== Awards ===
In 2001, McCalman was awarded the Centenary Medal “for [his] service to Australian society and the humanities in the study of history”. Subsequently, in 2007, McCalman was made an Officer of the Order of Australia as part of the Queen’s Birthday Honours List for “for service to history and to the humanities as a teacher, researcher and author, and through administrative, advocacy and advisory roles in academic and public sector organisations”.

== Key Ideas ==
=== Historian of British and European Culture ===
Early in his career, McCalman wrote extensively on his specialist field: the cultural history of Nineteenth and eighteenth century Britain and Europe. One of his earliest published academic works on the topic was published in 1980 and presented a revisionist historical approach to the role of women in radical socio-political movements during the early Nineteenth Century. In particular, McCalman found “that female involvement in popular radicalism was more extensive than usually believed” and in some cases exceeded the “’supplementary’ goals” assumed for the role of female radicals. The proceeding few years saw McCalman continue to explore his interest in British culture and radicalism in the late-eighteenth and early-nineteenth centuries with his 1988 book “Radical Underworld: Prophets, Revolutionaries and Pornographers in London, 1795-1840”. Some reviews of the book note McCalman’s ability to “shift … [the] angle of vision” of academic research in the over-saturated field of popular radicalism during this period of history. Similarly, a review of the same book by Professor Anne Humphreys from the City University of New York praises McCalman’s skills as a researcher, noting that he “has done much first-rate detective work” on the topic, but criticises him for “problematic” and contradicting interpretations of his sources.

=== Historiography and Historian of Emotion ===
A key voice in the growing study of biographies from a historical approach, an exploration of alternatives to the academic presentation of history exists in McCalman’s conference-turned-book, “National Biographies and National Identities”, wherein a number of essays regarding the value of biographies as a legitimate historical format is discussed. His introduction to the book summarises two major points across the essays: that national biographies also present a “distinctive … national character” and the historiographical implications of national biographies given their compatibility with digital media. McCalman’s work on studying biographies and its value in the study of history also includes a chapter in Brian Matthew’s 2004 book “Readers, Writers, Publishers”, as well as a “Session on Dual Biography” at a 2006 postgraduate workshop for the ANU’s Higher Research Centre. McCalman is also a proponent of public history: a historiographical school which promotes the publication of history in formats and works targeted at a general audience as opposed to academics and scholars. During a 2003 interview with the Age, McCalman stated that “popular histories have rediscovered the story, something at the heart of history, yet it's a skill many academics have given away. I'm convinced we've got to get it back”.

=== Re-Enactments ===
During the early 2000s, McCalman’s research interests pivoted from European and British cultural history to historiography and the value of historical re-enactments in the study of the past. This turn was inspired by his experience on the 2002 BBC program “The Ship: Retracing Cook’s Endeavor Voyage” whereby a group of volunteers, including McCalman, from a variety of backgrounds re-enact a stretch of Cook’s voyage on a replica of the Endeavor. The journey, which demanded the sailors follow the original Endeavor crew’s conditions and routines, followed Cook’s original route between Cairns, Australia, and Batavia, Indonesia. McCalman reflected on this experience in a 2003 memoir and article for the journal Meanjin, comparing his difficult journey to George Orwell’s 1984: “Big Brother demands a maximum of discomfort, danger and humiliation”.

Inspired by the ordeal, McCalman would continue to publish work related to historical re-enactments and popular history. Such works include the 2010 book “Historical Reenactment: from Realism to the Affective Turn” which explores the role of emotion in history through popular forms of history, contributing to the discourse surrounding history’s affective turn. McCalman also wrote, in a 2004 article for the academic journal Criticism, which recycles parts of his 2003 memoir of the voyage, “Endeavoring Reality”, to argue for the value of such unique experiences from an academic’s perspective in the digital era.

=== History of Science and Environment ===
Throughout the 2000s and 2010s, McCalman has written extensively on the topic of scientific discovery and the environment from a historical and humanities perspective. Focusing, in particular, on the scientific voyages by the likes of Charles Darwin, Matthew Flinders and James Cook, McCalman discusses in his works the exploration of the Pacific and Oceanic regions. This research has manifested in books such as “In the Wake of the Beagle: Science in the Southern Oceans in the Age of Darwin” and “Darwin’s Armada”. The latter book also inspired several museum exhibitions, including one from the University of Sydney’s Macleay Museum titled “Accidental Encounters”, and a 2009 documentary titled “Darwin’s Brave New World”.

McCalman, during this period, also began exploring the environment through humanities as well as interdisciplinary practices. A defining example of this approach is found in the introduction of the 2014 book “Rethinking Invasion Ecologies from the Environmental Humanities”. McCalman and his co-editor, an environmental historian, argue for the value of examining invasive flora and fauna through the lens of the humanities given that the transfer or introduction of species involve, not just biology, but human and cultural elements. The majority of the book, thus, is dedicated to “demonstrating how research derived from a humanities perspectives can transform our understandings of the character and implications of invasion ecologies”. McCalman has, in his solo works since then, adopted this humanities-based approach to discussions surrounding the environment. Such works include 2013 book “The Reef: A Passionate History”.

== Works ==
McCalman has written several commercially successful works, including trade books such as “The Seven Ordeals of Count Cagliostro”. This 2003 book, also known as “The Last Alchemist”, was published by Harper Collins Australia and details the life of Giuseppe Balsamo, an eighteenth-Century healer and alchemist. McCalman presented the history of Balsamo through seven stories, describing him through the eyes of those around him. To promote this book, McCalman was interviewed by Phillip Adams on the ABC Radio National programme Late Night Live during July 2003. Additionally, an interview of McCalman by the Age was published on 10 August 2003 and draws parallels between himself and Balsamo: “I was drawn to Balsamo because we shared a bogus African identity . . . During his years of fame, he'd pretended to be an Egyptian prince and prophet. In a way Cagliostro and I were both African pretenders”. In a review by the Sydney Morning Herald, the book was described as “neither a fully-fledged biography nor a thorough cultural history, but a little of both … It provides an admirable introduction to one of the most curious facets of the eighteenth-century”.

McCalman’s third trade book, titled “The Reef: a Passionate History”, was published in 2013 by Penguin Australia and once again adopts the format of featuring individual stories to depict an image of the subject: Australia’s Great Barrier Reef. The book, which features stories from Cook’s voyage in 1770 and Matthew Finders’ to the ship-wrecked Barbara Thomas, is an example of public history. As George Roff writes in his review: “McCalman has produced a fascinating book that is open to both scientists and general readers: almost anyone with a sense of curiosity about natural history will be intrigued by this work".

To promote the book, McCalman was a guest on the ABC Podcast series Conversations, hosted by Richard Fidler and Sarah Kanowski, in 2015. In a report from the Australian Academy of the Humanities, titled “the Power of the Humanities”, the book lead to John Büsst, a resident of Mission Beach which suffered damage from a cycle, approaching McCalman who helped “[secure] state heritage listing for Büsst’s home … It is destined to become a centre for artists, and for reef and rainforest environmental research”.
