= Melissa Ashley =

Australian novelist (born 1973)

- Born: 1973 (age 52–53); Christchurch, New Zealand
- Citizenship: Australia
- Education: University of Queensland
- Occupations: Writer, novelist
- Writing career
- Language: English
- Notable awards: Queensland Literary Award for Fiction (2017)

Melissa Ashley (born 1973) is an Australian novelist. At the 2017 Queensland Literary Awards, her novel The Birdman's Wife won the Fiction Book Award. It also received the Australian Booksellers Association Nielsen BookData 2017 Booksellers Choice Award.

== Biography ==
Ashley was born 1973 in Christchurch, New Zealand and arrived in Australia aged eight. Ashley has two children and is a self-confessed committed "twitcher".

== Career ==
She was the assistant director of Subverse: Queensland Poetry Festival from 1999–2001. She also coordinated The Arts Queensland Award for Unpublished Poetry.

Her short stories, essays, poems, and reviews have appeared in The Age, The Lifted Brow, Australian Book Review, Overland, and Catamaran Literary Review.

Ashley's interest in birds motivated her 2016 historical novel, The Birdman's Wife, about Elizabeth Gould, the English illustrator who drew specimens collected by her husband, John Gould, for his books on birds. Ashley wrote the novel as part of her PhD, whilst studying at the University of Queensland.

== Awards and honours ==
The Bee and the Orange Tree was shortlisted for the 2020 Davitt Award for best debut crime book.

At the 2022 Queensland Literary Awards, Ashley was awarded a Queensland Writers Fellowship valued at A$15,000.

== Works ==
- ——; Johnson, Ruth; Cvetkovic, Lidija (1996). Desire In Difference. Hetaira Press. ISBN 9780646290225.
- —— (2003). The Hospital for Dolls. Post Pressed. ISBN 9781876682507.
- —— (2009). The Maiden Without Hands: From Folktale and Fairy Tale to Contemporary Novel. St. Lucia. (M.Phil Thesis)
- —— (2016). The Birdman's Wife. South Melbourne: Affirm Press. ISBN 9781925344998.
- —— (2019). The Bee and the Orange Tree. South Melbourne: Affirm Press. ISBN 9781925712018.
- —— (2023). The Naturalist of Amsterdam (hardcover 1st ed.). South Melbourne: Affirm Press. ISBN 9781922863980.
