= Laura Elvery =

Australian author

Laura Elvery PhD
- Education: Centenary Heights State High School; Queensland University of Technology
- Writing career
- Years active: 2014 - present
- Genres: Novel; short fiction
- Website: lauraelvery.com

Laura Elvery is an Australian author and winner of the Queensland Literary Awards' Steele Rudd Award for her short story collection Ordinary Matter, and the 2026 Elizabeth Jolley Short Story Prize. Elvery's debut novel Nightingale won the People's Choice Queensland Book of the Year in 2025.

== Awards and honours ==
According to Thuy On for Sydney Review of Books, Ordinary Matter is inspired 'by the twenty times women have been awarded Nobel Prizes for science' and is a work which 'puts micro matter (plutonium, biomolecules, chromosomes, ribosomes, telomeres) into the bigger world of women’s lives as they go about their daily business striving for harmony between responsibility and ambition and carving out their own place in the world.' Ordinary Matter was shortlisted for the Queensland Literary Awards – Queensland Premier’s Award for a work of State Significance and for the 2022 Barbara Jefferis Award.

In 2018, Elvery's first collection of short stories, Trick of the Light, was a finalist in the Queensland Literary Awards. Her single short stories have won the Josephine Ulrick Prize for Literature, the Margaret River Short Story Competition, the Neilma Sidney Short Story Prize and the Fair Australia Prize for Fiction.

Elvery's debut novel, Nightingale – inspired by the life of Florence Nightingale – was published in 2025 by University of Queensland Press. In a Guardian review, Seren Heyman-Griffiths writes that, 'The physical world of Nightingale is rendered in extraordinary detail. It returns again and again to the physicality of care, to the “women’s work” of “holding up bodies”: the “sourness of damp clothes”, “scraps of dirty butter and sometimes-fresh meat”, the “tongue-pink, bacon-pink, brick-red, yellow” of a man’s exposed ribs. Elvery’s prose is both sensual and brutal, lingering on textures, smells and colours that refuse abstraction'. Nightingale won the People's Choice Queensland Book of the Year and was shortlisted for the Fiction Book Award at the 2025 Queensland Literary Awards. Nightingale was named one of Readings Best Australian Fiction Books of 2025.

Elvery won the 2026 Elizabeth Jolley Short Story Prize with her story "C.Q.D." set onboard the RMS Carpathia as it races to rescue survivors of the Titanic.
