= Kate Gordon (writer) =

Australian writer

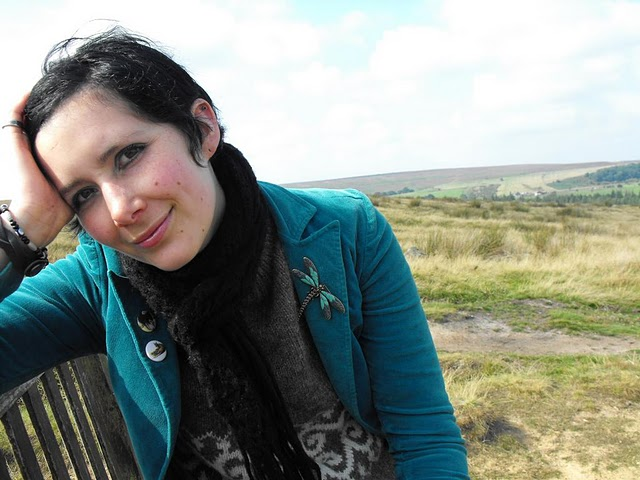
- Born: 1982 (age 43–44); Tasmania, Australia
- Occupation: Author
- Writing career
- Genre: Young adult fiction
- Website: www.kategordon.com.au

Kate Gordon is an Australian writer of young adult fiction.

== Biography ==
Gordon was born in 1982 in Tasmania, Australia. Gordon has studied Performing Arts and Information Management at the University of Tasmania, and Literary Studies at Deakin University. Prior to writing, she has worked as a librarian and bookseller, specialising in children's and young adult books.

In 2010, her first novel was published by Allen & Unwin, entitled Three Things About Daisy Blue, the twentieth and final novel in the Girlfriend Fiction series. In 2011, her second novel, Thyla was published by Random House Australia. Unlike her first novel, Thyla is a paranormal fiction, set in Hobart, Tasmania and its surroundings. It was inspired by a visit to the Cascades Female Factory historical site, and also a story written for her by her father about a thylacine named Tessa. The sequel to Thyla, entitled Vulpi, was released in April 2012.

Her 2020 book, Aster's Good, Right Things, won the 2021 Children's Book of the Year Award: Younger Readers.

== Bibliography ==
=== Novels ===
- Three things about Daisy Blue. Sydney: Allen & Unwin. 2010. ISBN 9781742372129.
- Thyla. Random House Australia. 2011. ISBN 9781864718812.
- Vulpi. Random House Australia. 2012. ISBN 9781742752365.
- Writing Clementine. Allen & Unwin. 2014. ISBN 9781743316634.
- Twenty-five Memories of Viggo MacDuff. Odyssey Books. 2017. ISBN 9781925652291.
- Girl Running, Boy Falling. Rhiza Edge. 2018. ISBN 9781925563528.
- Juno Jones, Word Ninja. Yellow Brick Books. 2019. ISBN 9780994557094.
- Juno Jones, Mystery Writer. Yellow Brick Books. 2019. ISBN 9780648492528.
- Juno Jones, Book Sleuth. Yellow Brick Books. 2020. ISBN 9780648492566.
- The Heartsong of Wonder Quinn. UQP. 2020. ISBN 9780702262821.
- Aster's Good, Right Things. Yellow Brick Books. 2020. ISBN 9780648492573.
- The Ballad of Melodie Rose. UQP. 2021. ISBN 9780702263217.
- Juno Jones, Rival Reader. Yellow Brick Books. 2021. ISBN 9780648492580.
- Xavier in the Meantime. Yellow Brick Books. 2022. ISBN 9780645218091.

=== Picture books ===
- Bird on a Wire. Hardie Grant Egmont. 2019. ISBN 9781760128586.
- Amira's Magpie. Wombat Books. 2021. ISBN 9781925563986.

=== Anthologies ===
- Wessely, Tehani, ed. (2013). "Shadows". One Small Step: An Anthology of Discoveries. FableCroft Publishing. ISBN 9780987400000.
- Pierce, Alexandra; Mondal, Mimi, eds. (2017). "Dear Ms Butler". Luminescent Threads: Connections to Octavia E. Butler. Twelfth Planet Press. ISBN 9781922101440.

=== Critical studies and reviews ===
- McGovern, Margot (June 2011). "[Untitled review of Thyla]". Australian Book Review (332): 79.
