= 2016 in Australian literature =

This article presents a list of the historical events and publications of Australian literature during 2016.

== Events ==
- The Mona Brand Award is awarded for the first time.

== Major publications ==
=== Literary fiction ===
- Melissa Ashley – The Birdman's Wife
- Georgia Blain – Between a Wolf and a Dog
- Don Dennis – The Guns of Muschu
- Hannah Kent – The Good People
- Jennifer Maiden – Play with Knives
- Liane Moriarty – Truly Madly Guilty
- Ryan O'Neill – Their Brilliant Careers
- Heather Rose – The Museum of Modern Love
- Philip Salom – Waiting
- Graeme Simsion – The Best of Adam Sharp
- Dominic Smith – The Last Painting of Sara de Vos
- Josephine Wilson – Extinctions

=== Children's and young adult fiction ===
- Trace Balla – Rockhopping
- Maxine Beneba Clarke – The Patchwork Bike
- Georgia Blain – Special
- John Flanagan – The Battle of Hackham Heath
- Andy Griffiths
  - The Tree House Fun Book
  - The 78-Storey Treehouse
- Zana Fraillon – The Bone Sparrow
- Tania McCartney – Smile/Cry: A Beginner's Book of Feelings
- Shivaun Plozza – Frankie
- Richard Roxburgh – Artie and the Grime Wave
- Claire Zorn – One Would Think the Deep

=== Crime and mystery ===
- Peter Corris – That Empty Feeling
- Garry Disher – Signal Loss
- Candice Fox and James Patterson – Never Never
- Jane Harper – The Dry
- Emily Maguire – An Isolated Incident
- Barry Maitland – Slaughter Park
- Adrian McKinty – Rain Dogs
- Matthew Reilly – The Four Legendary Kingdoms
- Jock Serong – The Rules of Backyard Cricket
- David Whish-Wilson – Old Scores
- Laura Elizabeth Woollett – The Love of a Bad Man

=== Science fiction and fantasy ===
- Alison Croggon – The Bone Queen
- Jay Kristoff – Nevernight
- Juliet Marillier – Den of Wolves
- Anthony O'Neill – The Dark Side
- C. S. Pacat – Kings Rising
- Lian Hearn – Emperor of the Eight Islands
- Angela Slatter – Vigil

=== Poetry ===
- Peter Boyle – Ghostspeaking
- Maxine Beneba Clarke – Carrying the World
- Brook Emery — Have Been and Are
- John Kinsella – Drowning in Wheat
- Berndt Sellheim – Awake at the Wheel
- Susan Varga – Rupture: Poems 2012–2015

=== Drama ===
- Leah Purcell – The Drover's Wife
- David Morton – The Wider Earth

=== Biographies ===
- Deng Thiak Adut with Ben McKelvey – Songs of a War Boy: My Story
- Julia Baird – Victoria: The Queen
- Jimmy Barnes – Working Class Boy
- Mark Colvin – Light and Shadow: Memoirs of a Spy's Son
- Suzanne Falkiner – Mick: A Life of Randolph Stow
- Stan Grant – Talking to My Country
- Cory Taylor – Dying: A Memoir

=== Non-fiction ===
- Tim Elliott – Farewell to the Father
- Richard Fidler – Ghost Empire
- Peter FitzSimons – Victory at Villers-Bretonneux: Why a French town will never forget the Anzacs
- Clementine Ford – Fight Like A Girl
- Helen Garner – Everywhere I Look
- David Hunt – True Girt: The Unauthorised History of Australia Volume 2
- Lynne Kelly – The Memory Code
- Tara Moss – Speaking Out: A 21st Century Handbook For Women and Girls

== Awards and honours ==
Note: these awards were presented in the year in question.

=== Lifetime achievement ===
Award	Author
Mona Brand Award	Joanna Murray-Smith
Patrick White Award	Carmel Bird

=== Literary ===
Award	Author	Title	Publisher
ALS Gold Medal	Brenda Niall	Mannix	Text Publishing
Colin Roderick Award	Gail Jones	A Guide to Berlin	Random House
Indie Book Awards Book of the Year	Charlotte Wood	The Natural Way of Things	Allen & Unwin
Nita Kibble Literary Award	Fiona Wright	Small Acts of Disappearance	Giramondo Publishing
Stella Prize	Charlotte Wood	The Natural Way of Things	Allen & Unwin
Victorian Prize for Literature	Mary Anne Butler	Broken	Currency Press

=== Fiction ===
==== National ====
Award	Author	Title	Publisher
Adelaide Festival Awards for Literature	Tamsin Janu	Figgy in the World	Omnibus Books
The Australian/Vogel Literary Award	Katherine Brabon	The Memory Artist	Allen & Unwin
Barbara Jefferis Award	Peggy Frew	Hope Farm	Scribe
Indie Book Awards Book of the Year – Fiction	Charlotte Wood	The Natural Way of Things	Allen & Unwin
Indie Book Awards Book of the Year – Debut Fiction	Lucy Treloar	Salt Creek	Macmillan
Miles Franklin Award	A. S. Patrić	Black Rock White City	Transit Lounge
Prime Minister's Literary Awards	Lisa Gorton (joint winner)	The Life of Houses	Giramondo
Prime Minister's Literary Awards	Charlotte Wood (joint winner)	The Natural Way of Things	Allen & Unwin
New South Wales Premier's Literary Awards	Merlinda Bobis	Locust Girl: A Lovesong	Spinifex Press
Queensland Literary Awards	Georgia Blain	Between a Wolf and a Dog	Scribe
Victorian Premier's Literary Award	Mireille Juchau	The World Without Us	Bloomsbury Publishing
Western Australian Premier's Book Awards	Joan London	The Golden Age	Vintage Books
Voss Literary Prize	Leah Kaminsky	The Waiting Room	Random House

=== Children and young adult ===
==== National ====
Award	Category	Author	Title	Publisher
Children's Book of the Year Award	Older Readers	Fiona Wood	Cloudwish	Macmillan Australia
Children's Book of the Year Award	Younger Readers	Morris Gleitzman	Soon	Viking Books
Children's Book of the Year Award	Picture Book	Nadia Wheatley, text Armin Greder, illus.	Flight	Windy Hollow Books
Children's Book of the Year Award	Early Childhood	Anna Walker	Mr Huff	Penguin Random House
Indie Book Awards Book of the Year	Children's	Aaron Blabey	The Bad Guys: Episode 1	Scholastic Australia
Indie Book Awards Book of the Year	Young Adult	Fiona Wood	Cloudwish	Pan MacMillan
New South Wales Premier's Literary Awards	Children's	Rebecca Young & Matt Ottley	Teacup	Scholastic Australia
New South Wales Premier's Literary Awards	Young People's	Alice Pung	Laurinda	Black Inc.
Victorian Premier's Literary Award	Young Adult Fiction	Marlee Jane Ward	Welcome to Orphancorp	Xou Pty Ltd

=== Crime and mystery ===
==== National ====
Award	Category	Author	Title	Publisher
Davitt Award	Novel	Emma Viskic	Resurrection Bay	Echo Publishing
Davitt Award	Young adult novel	Fleur Ferris	Risk	Random House
Davitt Award	Children's novel	R. A Spratt	Friday Barnes, Under Suspicion	Random House
Davitt Award	True crime	Alecia Simmonds	Wild Man	Affirm Press
Davitt Award	Debut novel	Emma Viskic	Resurrection Bay	Echo Publishing
Davitt Award	Debut novel	Fleur Ferris	Risk	Random House
Davitt Award	Readers' choice	Emma Viskic	Resurrection Bay	Echo Publishing
Ned Kelly Award	Novel	Dave Warner	Before It Breaks	Fremantle Press
Ned Kelly Award	First novel	Emma Viskic	Resurrection Bay	Echo Publishing
Ned Kelly Award	True crime	Gideon Haigh	Certain Admissions	Penguin
Ned Kelly Award	Lifetime achievement	Not awarded		

=== Science fiction ===
Award	Category	Author	Title	Publisher
Aurealis Award	Sf Novel	Amie Kaufman and Jay Kristoff	Gemima: The Illuminae Files 2	Allen & Unwin
Aurealis Award	Sf Short Story	Samantha Murray	"Of Sight, of Mind, of Heart"	Clarkesworld 122
Aurealis Award	Fantasy Novel	Jay Kristoff	Nevernight	Harper Voyager
Aurealis Award	Fantasy Short Story	Thoraiya Dyer	"Where the Pelican Builds Her Nest"	In Your Face (FableCroft Publishing)
Aurealis Award	Horror Novel	Kaaron Warren	The Grief Hole	IFWG Publishing Australia
Aurealis Award	Horror Short Story	TR Napper	"Flame Trees"	Asimov’s Science Fiction
Aurealis Award	Young Adult Novel	Alison Goodman	Lady Helen and the Dark Days Pact	HarperCollins Publishers
Aurealis Award	Young Adult Short Story	Leife Shallcross	"Pretty Jennie Greenteeth"	Strange Little Girls (Belladonna Publishing)
Ditmar Award	Novel	Lisa L. Hannett	Lament for the Afterlife	ChiZine Publications
Ditmar Award	Best Novella or Novelette	Sean Williams	"Of Sorrow and Such"	Of Sorrow and Such (Tor.com)
Ditmar Award	Best Short Story	Kathleen Jennings	"A Hedge of Yellow Roses"	Hear Me Roar (Ticonderoga Publications)

=== Poetry ===
Award	Author	Title	Publisher
Adelaide Festival Awards for Literature	Les Murray	Waiting for the Past	Black Inc
Anne Elder Award	John Hawke	Aurelia	Cordite Books
Mary Gilmore Award	Benedict Andrews	Lens Flare	Pitt Street Poetry
Prime Minister's Literary Awards	Sarah Holland-Batt	The Hazards	University of Queensland Press
New South Wales Premier's Literary Awards	Joanne Burns	brush	Giramondo Publishing
Queensland Literary Awards	David Musgrave	Anatomy of Voice	GloriaSMH
Victorian Premier's Literary Award	Alan Loney	Crankhandle	Cordite Books
Western Australian Premier's Book Awards	Lucy Dougan	The Guardians	Giramondo Publishing

=== Drama ===
Award	Category	Author	Title	Publisher
New South Wales Premier's Literary Awards	Script	Cate Shortland	Deadline Gallipoli, Episode 4: "The Letter"	Matchbox Pictures & Full Clip Productions
Patrick White Playwrights' Award	Award	Lewis Treston	Hot Tub	Sydney Theatre Company
Patrick White Playwrights' Award	Fellowship	Andrew Bovell		

=== Non-fiction ===
Award	Category	Author	Title	Publisher
Adelaide Festival Awards for Literature	Non-Fiction	Robert Dessaix	What Days Are For	Random House Australia
Indie Book Awards Book of the Year	Non-Fiction	Magda Szubanski	Reckoning: A Memoir	Text Publishing
National Biography Award	Biography	Brenda Niall	Mannix	Text Publishing
New South Wales Premier's Literary Awards	Non-Fiction	Magda Szubanski	Reckoning: A Memoir	Text Publishing
New South Wales Premier's History Awards	Australian History	Stuart Macintyre	Australia’s Boldest Experiment: War and Reconstruction in the 1940s	NewSouth Books
New South Wales Premier's History Awards	Community and Regional History	Tanya Evans	Fractured Families: Life on the Margins in Colonial New South Wales	University of New South Wales Press
New South Wales Premier's History Awards	General History	Ann McGrath	Illicit Love: Interracial Sex and Marriage in the United States and Australia	Nebraska University Press
Queensland Literary Awards	Non-Fiction	Fiona Wright	Small Acts of Disappearance: Essays on Hunger	Giramondo
Victorian Premier's Literary Award	Non-fiction	Gerald Murnane	Something for the Pain	Text Publishing

== Deaths ==
- 31 January – David Lake, science fiction novelist (born 1929 in India)
- 3 February – Dimitris Tsaloumas, poet (born 1921 in Greece)
- 6 February – John Patterson, screenwriter, lyricist, playwright and children's author
- 19 February – Kim Gamble, illustrator of children's books (born 1952)
- 3 April – Bob Ellis, writer, journalist, filmmaker, and political commentator (born 1942)
- 20 April – Dame Leonie Judith Kramer, author, editor and academic (born 1924)
- 16 May – Gillian Mears, short story writer and novelist (born 1964)
- 5 July – Cory Taylor, writer (born 1955)
- 15 July – Billy Marshall Stoneking, poet, playwright, filmmaker and teacher (born 1947 in Orlando, Florida)
- 4 September – Richard Neville, writer and social commentator (born 1941)
- 8 September – Inga Clendinnen, author and historian (born 1934)
- 3 October – Narelle Oliver, award-winning children's author-illustrator, artist and print maker (born 1960)
- 19 November – Margaret Paice, children's writer and illustrator (born 1920)
- 9 December – Georgia Blain, novelist, journalist and biographer (born 1964)
- 12 December –
  - Anne Deveson, writer, broadcaster, filmmaker and social commentator (born 1930 in Kuala Lumpur, Malaysia)
  - Shirley Hazzard, novelist, short story writer, and essayist (died in Manhattan, New York)(born 1931)

== See also ==
- 2016 in Australia
- 2016 in literature
- 2016 in poetry
- List of years in Australian literature
- List of years in literature
- List of Australian literary awards
