= Ailsa Piper =

Australian writer, director and performer (born 1959)

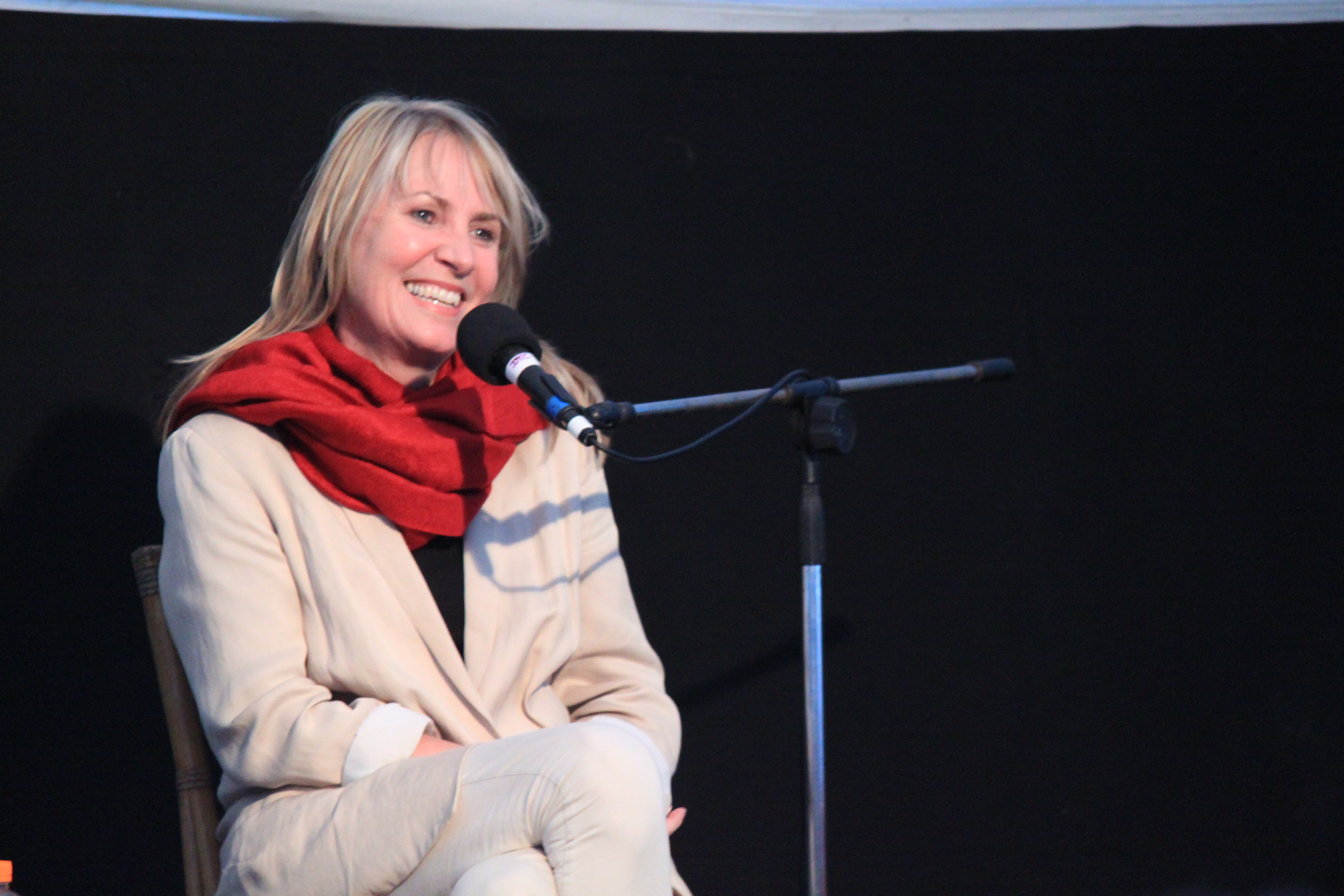
- Piper at the Byron Writers Festival in 2012
- Born: Ailsa Mary-Ellen Piper; 1959 (age 66–67); Perth, Western Australia, Australia
- Education: Santa Maria College, Perth (1976)
- Years active: 1980s–2005
- Known for: Neighbours as Ruth Wilkinson (1996–1999; 2005)
- Spouse: Peter Curtin (1987–18 May 2014; his death)

Ailsa Mary-Ellen Piper (born 1959) is an Australian writer, director and performer.

== Early life ==
Piper attended Santa Maria College, a Catholic day and boarding school located in Attadale, Perth. She graduated in 1976. Her work in theatre took her from Western Australia, to Sydney, and then to Melbourne.

Her parents divorced when she was a child, when Piper's mother left him for another man, six years into their marriage. Her father, who had grown up on a West Australian wheat farm, remarried, but his second wife died of an aneurysm at the age of 50. Five years after her stepmother's death, Piper's mother died at the age of 57.

== Career ==
=== Acting ===
Piper worked as an actor in theatre in Perth, Sydney and Melbourne from the early 1980s until 2000. She made her first appearance on TV in 1984 in the made-for-television film Man of Letters, but is best known for playing Ruth Wilkinson in long-running soap opera Neighbours from 1996 until 1999. She reprised the role in a cameo for the series' 20th anniversary special in 2005.

Piper is also an accomplished narrator of audio books, and continues to work in this field. In 2016, she narrated "Hope Farm" by Peggy Frew and "The Natural Way of Things" by Charlotte Wood. She also performs a monologue based on the influence of poetry in her life and in particular, on her walking. This was first broadcast on ABC Radio's "Poetica" programme, and has since been adapted by Piper for live performance.

=== Writing and directing ===
Piper has written for ABC Radio, for the theatre, and for The Age, The Australian, Slow Living magazine and Eureka Street as well as various online journals.

In 2000, she was a co-winner of the Patrick White Playwrights' Award for her drama Small Mercies. In 2012, Bell Shakespeare produced a version of The Duchess of Malfi, which was co-adapted by Piper. Piper has directed for Red Stitch, the Melbourne Theatre Company, the VCA, WAAPA and Shy Tiger Productions. Her production of The Night Season was nominated for a Green Room Award for direction.

While working on Neighbours, Piper studied an MA in Creative Writing at University of Melbourne, which prompted her to start writing books. In 2012, her first book, a travel memoir called "Sinning Across Spain" was published by Melbourne University Press. Her next book, "The Attachment: Letters from a Most Unlikely Friendship", detailing a collection of letters between herself and a Catholic priest, was published by Allen & Unwin in 2017. It was co-authored by Tony Doherty. Her third book, "For Life: A Memoir of Living, Dying – and Flying", published by Allen & Unwin and released in 2024, is a story of recovery from grief and trauma. It took her eight years to write.

Piper has served on numerous boards, and has five times judged the Victorian Premier's Literary Awards – four times for Drama and once for Fiction. She chaired the judging panel for the 2016 and 2017 NSW Premiers Award for Drama.

Piper is an accomplished moderator and interviewer and regularly hosts conversations at literary festivals or libraries.

== Personal life ==
Piper was married to Australian television actor Peter Curtin from 1987 until his death in 2014.

== Credits ==
=== Television ===
Year	Title	Role	Notes
1982	Kicking Around	Leigh	10 episodes
1984	Man of Letters	Winnie Harmstrung	TV movie
1986	A Country Practice	Patricia Reynolds	1 episode
1990	Embassy	Renare	1 episode
1991	The Flying Doctors	Mary Baldwin	1 episode
1992	Lift Off		1 episode
1991–1992	Kelly	Maggie Patterson	26 episodes
1993	Time Trax	Carla Gilford	1 episode
1996–1999; 2005	Neighbours	Ruth Wilkinson	241 episodes
2002	Blue Heelers	Glenys Hopper	2 episodes
2002	Guinevere Jones	Amanda	1 episode
2003	The Saddle Club	Whitney	2 episodes
2003	MDA	Dr Carol Westerman	1 episode

=== Theatre ===
==== As actor ====
Year	Title	Role	Notes
1977	Martello Towers	Vivien Martello	The Hole in the Wall Theatre, Perth, with National Theatre
1979	One Flew Over the Cuckoo's Nest	Nurse Flinn / Sandra	The Hole in the Wall Theatre, Perth
1980	Spring Awakening		The New Dolphin Theatre, Perth
1980	A Midsummer Night's Dream		The New Dolphin Theatre, Perth
1980	The Effect of Gamma Rays on Man-in-the-Moon Marigolds		The New Dolphin Theatre, Perth
1980	Vanities	Kathy	The Hole in the Wall Theatre, Perth
1981	Charley's Aunt		His Majesty's Theatre, Perth
1981	The Elephant Man	Pinhead / Princess Alexandra	Playhouse, Perth with National Theatre
1981	Traitors	Ekaterina / Guard / Peasant	The Hole in the Wall Theatre, Perth
1981	Upside Down at the Bottom of the World	Victoria	The Hole in the Wall Theatre, Perth
1981–1982	Summer of the Seventeenth Doll		The Hole in the Wall Theatre, Perth
1982	Cloud Nine		The Hole in the Wall Theatre, Perth
1986	Some Night in Julia Creek	Gillian	Russell Street Theatre, Melbourne, with MTC
1986	Hurlyburly	Darlene	Russell Street Theatre, Melbourne, with MTC
1988	These Days		Melbourne Athenaeum with Melbourne Ensemble Theatre
1989	Coralie Lansdowne Says No	Coralie Lansdowne	Studio Theatre, Melbourne, Monash University, Melbourne, West Gippsland Arts Centre with Playbox Theatre Company
1993	A Happy and Holy Occasion	Mary O'Mahon	Malthouse Theatre, Melbourne, Theatre Royal, Hobart with Playbox Theatre Company
1994	Boccaccio: Tales from the Decameron		Florentino Restaurant, Melbourne for Melbourne Fringe Festival
1996	Gary's House	Christine	Q Theatre, Penrith, Malthouse Theatre, Melbourne, Gold Coast Arts Centre, Hobart with Playbox Theatre Company
2000	Goodbye Mrs Blore	Dr Julia Lewis	Darebin Arts and Entertainment Centre with HIT Productions

==== As writer / director ====
Year	Title	Role	Notes
1992	Horrortorio	Devisor	La Boite, Brisbane
2001	Patrick White Playwrights' Awards	Playwright (Small Mercies)	Wharf Theatre, Sydney, with STC
2001	The Twilight Series	Coordinator	Collins St Baptist Church, Melbourne, with Playbox Theatre Company
2005	The Night Season	Director	Red Stitch Actors Theatre, Melbourne
2006	Controlled Crying	Director	Chapel Off Chapel, Melbourne
2006	Hellbent	Adaptor	Red Stitch Actors Theatre, Melbourne
2012	The Duchess of Malfi	Adaptor	Sydney Opera House with Bell Shakespeare

=== Audio book narration ===
Year	Title	Author
2016	"Hope Farm"	Peggy Frew
2016	"The Natural Way of Things"	Charlotte Wood
2017	"The Writer's Room"	Charlotte Wood
2025	"Stone Yard Devotional"	Charlotte Wood

=== Books ===
Year	Title	Publisher
2012	"Sinning Across Spain"	Melbourne University Press
2017	"The Attachment: Letters from a Most Unlikely Friendship"	Allen & Unwin (co-written with Tony Doherty)
2024	"For Life: A Memoir of Living, Dying – and Flying"	Allen & Unwin
