= Barbara Jefferis Award =

Australian literary award

The Barbara Jefferis Award is an Australian literary award prize. The award was created in 2007 after being endowed by John Hinde upon his death to commemorate his late wife, author Barbara Jefferis. It is funded by his $1 million bequest. Originally an annual award, it has been awarded biennially since 2012.

Jefferis was an Australian writer, and a founding member and first female president of the Australian Society of Authors. She died in 2004. Australian author, Thomas Keneally, described Jefferis as "a rare being amongst authors, being both a fine writer but also organisationally gifted".

The award, which comprises $50,000 for the winner with $5,000 distributed amongst the shortlist, is one of Australia's richest literary prizes. It is awarded to "the best novel written by an Australian author that depicts women and girls in a positive way or otherwise empowers the status of women and girls in society". The novel can be in any genre and does not have to be set in Australia. The award does not specify the author's gender. It is administered by the Australian Society of Authors and is expected to rival the Miles Franklin Award ($42,000) and the biennial Tasmania Pacific Fiction Prize ($40,000).

The prize was first awarded in 2008 to Rhyll McMaster for Feather Man (Brandl & Schlesinger).

== Controversy ==
The announcement of the award caused a minor controversy in Australian literary circles due to its target. Susan Wyndham, journalist and literary editor, best summarises the issue in the questions opening her article in The Sydney Morning Herald Blogs: "Does Australia need a new fiction award that encourages 'positive' portrayals of women and girls? Or is it an outdated gesture in a post-feminist culture rich with female authors, characters and readers?"

Wyndham reports Rosalind Hinde, daughter of John Hinde and Barbara Jefferis, as saying that her father had "the very clear and strong intention to honour my mother's writing, her feminism and her devotion to other writers". Several writers have supported the award, including Tom Keneally, Helen Garner, Frank Moorhouse, Gerald Murnane, Anne Deveson, Kerryn Goldsworthy and Brian Castro. However, writer and critic, Andrew Reimer dislikes the idea of focusing on "social agenda" over "novelist's skill and imagination", and novelist Emily McGuire agreed, stating that she doesn't "like the idea of judging fiction based on its message". Author and critic, Debra Adelaide, expressed her concern that the award might encourage "safe and constrained" writing and wondered whether "we are getting to the point where we have more awards than publishing opportunities".

== Winners ==
Each year's winners and shortlists, along with the past winners, are listed on the relevant Australian Society of Authors page.

- 2008 – Feather Man, Rhyll McMaster
- 2009 – The Spare Room, Helen Garner
- 2010 – The China Garden, Kristina Olsson
- 2011 – Come Inside, G. L. Osborne
- 2012 – All That I Am, Anna Funder
- 2013 – not awarded. The 2014 award was for 2013/2014
- 2014 – Sea Hearts, Margo Lanagan (joint winner)
- 2014 – The Night Guest, Fiona McFarlane (joint winner)
- 2016 – Hope Farm, Peggy Frew
- 2018 – The Trapeze Act, Libby Angel
- 2020 – Wolfe Island, Lucy Treloar
- 2022 – Revenge, S. L. Lim
- 2024 – Songs for the Dead and the Living, Sara M. Saleh (joint winner)
- 2024 – Days of Innocence and Wonder, Lucy Treloar (joint winner)
- 2026 – The Sun Was Electric Light, Rachel Morton

== Shortlisted works ==
Winners are listed in bold type.

Year	Title	Author	Publisher	References
2008	**Feather Man**	Rhyll McMaster	Brandl & Schlesinger	
2008	The Anatomy of Wings	Karen Foxlee	University of Queensland Press	
2008	Burning In	Mireille Juchau	Giramondo	
2008	The Gospel of Gods and Crocodiles	Elizabeth Stead	University of Queensland Press	
2008	The Lost Dog	Michelle de Kretser	Allen & Unwin	
2008	Seamstress	Geraldine Wooller	University of Western Australia Press	
2009	**The Spare Room**	Helen Garner	Text	
2009	Addition	Toni Jordan	Text	
2009	The Last Sky	Alice Nelson	Fremantle Press	
2009	The Lifeboat	Zacharey Jane	University of Queensland Press	
2009	People of the Book	Geraldine Brooks	Fourth Estate (HarperCollins)	
2009	Sustenance	Simone Lazaroo	University of Western Australia Press	
2010	**The China Garden**	Kristina Olsson	University of Queensland Press	
2010	Headlong	Susan Varga	UWA Publishing	
2010	The Lost Life	Steven Carroll	HarperCollins	
2010	Swimming	Enza Gandolfo	Vanark Press	
2010	The World Beneath	Cate Kennedy	Scribe	
2011	**Come Inside**	G. L. Osborne	Clouds of Magellan	
2011	Good Daughter	Honey Brown	Penguin/Viking	
2011	Indelible Ink	Fiona Kelly McGregor	Scribe	
2011	Like Being a Wife	Catherine Harris	Vintage	
2011	Sustenance	Simone Lazaroo	University of Western Australia Press	
2012	**All That I Am**	Anna Funder	Penguin	
2012	Cold Light	Frank Moorhouse	Vintage	
2012	Five Bells	Gail Jones	Vintage	
2012	Foal's Bread	Gillian Mears	Allen & Unwin	
2012	Too Close to Home	Georgia Blain	Vintage	
2012	When We Have Wings	Claire Corbett	Allen & Unwin	
2014	**Sea Hearts**	Margo Lanagan	Allen & Unwin	
2014	**The Night Guest**	Fiona McFarlane	Penguin	
2014	The First Week	Margaret Merrilees	Wakefield Press	
2014	The Life and Loves of Lena Gaunt	Tracy Farr	Fremantle Press	
2014	The Mountain	Drusilla Modjeska	Vintage	
2014	Pilgrimage	Jacinta Halloran	Scribe	
2014	Sufficient Grace	Amy Espeseth	Scribe Publications	
2016	**Hope Farm**	Peggy Frew	Scribe Publications	
2016	A Guide to Berlin	Gail Jones	Vintage	
2016	Laurinda	Alice Pung	Black Inc.	
2016	The Natural Way of Things	Charlotte Wood	Allen & Unwin	
2016	The Protected	Claire Zorn	University of Queensland Press	
2016	This Picture of You	Sarah Hopkins	Allen & Unwin	
2018	**The Trapeze Act**	Libby Angel	Text	
2018	From the Wreck	Jane Rawson	Transit Lounge	
2018	Goodwood	Holly Throsby	Allen & Unwin	
2018	Storyland	Catherine McKinnon	HarperCollins	
2018	Troppo	Madelaine Dickie	Fremantle Press	
2020	**Wolfe Island**	Lucy Treloar	Picador	
2020	There Was Still Love	Favel Parrett	Hachette	
2020	Too Much Lip	Melissa Lucashenko	University of Queensland Press	
2020	The White Girl	Tony Birch	University of Queensland Press	
2020	The Yield	Tara June Winch	Hamish Hamilton	
2022	**Revenge: Murder in Three Parts**	S. L. Lim	Transit Lounge	
2022	The Bass Rock	Evie Wyld	Penguin	
2022	Benevolence	Julie Janson	Magabala	
2022	Bodies of Light	Jennifer Down	Text	
2022	Ordinary Matter	Laura Elvery	University of Queensland Press	
2022	Smart Ovens for Lonely People	Elizabeth Tan	Brio	
2024	**Songs For the Dead and Living**	Sara M. Saleh	Affirm	
2024	**Days of Innocence and Wonder**	Lucy Treloar	Pan Macmillan Australia	
2024	Salonika Burning	Gail Jones	Text	
2024	Edenglassie	Melissa Lucashenko	University of Queensland Press	
2024	Sunbirds	Miranda Riwoe	University of Queensland Press	
2024	Stone Yard Devotional	Charlotte Wood	Allen & Unwin	
2026	**The Sun Was Electric Light**	Rachel Morton	University of Queensland Press	
2026	Translations	Jumaana Abdu	Vintage	
2026	Theory & Practice	Michelle de Kretser	Text Publishing	
2026	Rapture	Emily Maguire	Allen & Unwin	
2026	A Piece of Red Cloth	Leonie Norrington, Djawundil Maymuru, Merrkiyawuy Ganambarr-Stubbs & Djawa Burarrwanga	Allen & Unwin	
2026	Out of the Woods	Gretchen Shirm	Transit Lounge	

== See also ==
- List of literary awards honoring women
