= 17th Helpmann Awards =

2017 Australian live performance awards

- Date: 24 July 2017
- Location: Capitol Theatre, Sydney
- Hosted by: Jan van de Stool and Tim Draxl

Television/radio coverage
- Network: Foxtel Arts

The 17th Annual Helpmann Awards for live performance in Australia was held on 24 July 2017 at the Capitol Theatre, Sydney. Nominations were announced on 19 June 2017. The ceremony was hosted by Jan van de Stool and Tim Draxl.

Winners of major awards included play The Drover's Wife, opera Saul and musical The Book of Mormon.

== Recipients and nominations ==
=== Theatre ===
Best Play	Best Direction of a Play
The Drover's Wife – Belvoir; Jasper Jones – Melbourne Theatre Company; Once in Royal David's City – Queensland Theatre and Black Swan State Theatre Company; Things I Know To Be True – State Theatre Company South Australia and Frantic Assembly	Leticia Cáceres – The Drover's Wife; Judy Davis – Faith Healer (Belvoir); Susie Dee – SHIT (Dee & Cornelius and Sydney Festival); Kip Williams – Chimerica (Sydney Theatre Company)
Best Female Actor in a Play	Best Male Actor in a Play
Kate Mulvany – Richard 3 (Bell Shakespeare); Helen Morse – John (Melbourne Theatre Company); Leah Purcell – The Drover's Wife; Alison Whyte – Faith Healer	Mark Coles Smith – The Drover's Wife; Jason Chong – Chimerica; Colin Friels – Faith Healer; Jason Klarwein – Once in Royal David's City
Best Female Actor in a Supporting Role in a Play	Best Male Actor in a Supporting Role in a Play
Amber McMahon – Girl Asleep (Windmill Theatre Company); Chloe Bayliss – Gloria (Griffin Theatre Company); Tilda Cobham-Hervey – Things I Know To Be True; Melita Jurisic – John	Guy Simon – Jasper Jones; Peter Carroll – Twelfth Night (Belvoir); Pip Miller – Faith Healer; Jamie Oxenbould – The Literati (Bell Shakespeare & Griffin Theatre Company)

=== Musicals ===
Best Musical
The Book of Mormon – Anne Garefino, Scott Rudin, Important Musicals, John Frost, Roger Berlind, Scott M. Delman, Jean Doumanian, Roy Furman, Stephanie P. McClelland, Kevin Morris, Jon B. Platt, Sonia Friedman Productions; Aladdin – Disney Theatrical Productions (Australia); Kinky Boots – Michael Cassel by special arrangement with Daryl Roth and Hal Luftig; My Fair Lady – Opera Australia and John Frost
Best Direction of a Musical	Best Choreography in a Musical
Trey Parker and Casey Nicholaw – The Book of Mormon; Julie Andrews – My Fair Lady; Jerry Mitchell – Kinky Boots; Casey Nicholaw – Aladdin	Jerry Mitchell – Kinky Boots; Christopher Gattelli – My Fair Lady; Casey Nicholaw – Aladdin; Casey Nicholaw – The Book of Mormon
Best Female Actor in a Musical	Best Male Actor in a Musical
Anna O'Byrne – My Fair Lady; Amy Lehpamer – Dusty (The Production Company); Zahra Newman – The Book of Mormon; Sophie Wright – Kinky Boots	Callum Francis – Kinky Boots; Charles Edwards – My Fair Lady; AJ Holmes – The Book of Mormon; Ainsley Melham – Aladdin
Best Female Actor in a Supporting Role in a Musical	Best Male Actor in a Supporting Role in a Musical
Robyn Nevin – My Fair Lady; Teagan Wouters – Kinky Boots; Lucy Maunder – Matilda the Musical (The Royal Shakespeare Company and Louise Withers, Michael Coppel and Michael Watt with Chokey Productions, Just for Laughs Theatricals, Glass Half Full Productions, Paula Marie Black, Greenleaf Productions and Michael Lynch); Phoebe Panaretos – Green Day's American Idiot (shake & stir theatre co and QPAC)	Michael James Scott – Aladdin; Reg Livermore – My Fair Lady; Bert LaBonte – The Book of Mormon; Rowan Witt – The Book of Mormon

=== Opera and Classical Music ===
Best Opera	Best Direction of an Opera
Saul – Glyndebourne Festival Opera and Adelaide Festival in association with the State Opera of South Australia, the Adelaide Symphony Orchestra and the Adelaide Festival Centre; Cavalleria Rusticana & I Pagliacci – Opera Australia; Così fan tutte – Opera Australia; King Roger – Opera Australia	Barrie Kosky – Saul; Gale Edwards – Cloudstreet (State Opera South Australia); David McVicar – Così fan tutte; Damiano Michieletto – Cavalleria Rusticana & I Pagliacci
Best Female Performer in an Opera	Best Male Performer in an Opera
Lise Lindstrom – The Ring Cycle (Opera Australia); Nicole Car – Così fan tutte; Rachelle Durkin – Armida (Pinchgut Opera); Antoinette Halloran – Tosca (West Australian Opera)	Christopher Purves – Saul; Michael Honeyman – King Roger; Yonghoon Lee – Carmen (Opera Australia); George Petean – Simon Boccanegra (Opera Australia)
Best Female Performer in a Supporting Role in an Opera	Best Male Performer in a Supporting Role in an Opera
Lorina Gore – King Roger; Anna Dowsley – Così fan tutte; Taryn Fiebig – Così fan tutte; Caitlin Hulcup – Theodora (Pinchgut Opera)	Kanen Breen – Saul; José Carbó – Cavalleria Rusticana & I Pagliacci; Saimir Pirgu – King Roger; Daniel Sumegi – The Ring Cycle
Best Symphony Orchestra Concert	Best Chamber and/or Instrumental Ensemble Concert
Stemme, Skelton, Tristan & Isolde – Tasmanian Symphony Orchestra; Asher Fisch Conducts Resurrection – West Australian Symphony Orchestra; The Firebird – Ravishing – Sydney Symphony Orchestra; The Rite of Spring – Primal – Sydney Symphony Orchestra	Academy of St Martin in the Fields – Sydney Opera House, Melbourne Recital Centre and QPAC; Bach Violin Concertos – Australian Chamber Orchestra; Julia Lezhneva – Baroque Brilliance – Australian Chamber Orchestra; Monteverdi L'Orfeo – Concerto Italiano – Adelaide Festival
Best Individual Classical Performance	
Joshua Bell – Academy of St Martin in the Fields; Richard Tognetti – Bach Violin Concertos; Daniil Trifonov – Young Russians: Prokofiev, Rachmaninoff & Shostakovich (Sydney Symphony Orchestra); Christoph von Dohnanyi – Romantic Memories: Dohnanyi conducts Bruckner (Sydney Symphony Orchestra)	

=== Dance and Physical Theatre ===
Best Ballet	Best Dance Production
Snow White – Ballet Preljocaj – Ballet Preljocaj, QPAC and Brisbane Festival; Strictly Gershwin – Queensland Ballet and QPAC; Solo Echo – Nederlands Dans Theater – Arts Centre Melbourne and Nederlands Dans Theater; We Who Are Left – Queensland Ballet and QPAC	Attractor – Dancenorth and Lucy Guerin Inc, with Arts Centre Melbourne, WOMADelaide and Brisbane Festival; Intimate Space – Restless Dance Theatre in association with the Adelaide Festival; OUR land people stories – Bangarra Dance Theatre; Split – Lucy Guerin Inc and Arts House
Best Visual or Physical Theatre Production	Best Choreography in a Ballet, Dance or Physical Theatre Production
Snake Sessions – Branch Nebula and Intimate Spectacle toured by Arts on Tour; Mermermer – Chunky Move; Sediment – Company 2; Still Life – Dimitris Papaioannou and Sydney Festival	Gideon Obarzanek and Lucy Guerin – Attractor; Lucy Guerin – Split; Gabrielle Nankivell – Wildebeest (Sydney Dance Company); Darcy Grant with Jacob Randell, Jascha Boyce, Simon McClure, Lachlan Binns, Mieke Lizotte, Lewie West, Martin Schreiber, Joanne Curry, Lachlan Harper, Jackson Manson, Triton Tunis-Mitchell and Lewis Rankin – Backbone (Gravity and Other Myths and Adelaide Festival)
Best Female Dancer in a Ballet, Dance or Physical Theatre Production	Best Male Dancer in a Ballet, Dance or Physical Theatre Production
Lilian Steiner – Split; Samantha Hines – Attractor; Elma Kris – Nyapanyapa (Bangarra Dance Theatre); Melanie Lane – Split	Kevin Jackson – Nijinsky (The Australian Ballet); Benjamin Hancock – The Dark Chorus (Lucy Guerin Inc); Bernhard Knauer – Wildebeest; Andre Santos – Beauty & the Beast (West Australian Ballet)

=== Contemporary Music ===
Best Australian Contemporary Concert	Best International Contemporary Concert
Nick Cave & the Bad Seeds – Nick Cave & the Bad Seeds and Billions Australia; The Beginning & The End – Deborah Conway & Willy Zygier with QPAC, NFSA, Arts Centre Melbourne, Theatre Royal, Margaret River Cultural Centre & StudioVictor; Flume – Flume, Future Classic, Chugg Entertainment and Laneway Presents; Missy Higgins Orchestral Concert Series 2016 – Missy Higgins and Frontier Touring	Patti Smith And Her Band Australian Tour 2017 – Patti Smith and Bluesfest Touring; Adele Live 2017 – Adele and Live Nation Australasia; Bruce Springsteen and the E Street Band – Summer '17 – Bruce Springsteen and the E Street Band and Frontier Touring; PJ Harvey – PJ Harvey and Billions Australia
Best Contemporary Music Festival	
MONA FOMA 2017 – Museum of Old and New Art; The 28th Annual Bluesfest Byron Bay – The 28th Annual Bluesfest Byron Bay; St Jerome's Laneway Festival 2017 – Lunatic Entertainment & Laneway Presents; WOMADelaide 2017 – Womadelaide Foundation

=== Other ===
Best Cabaret Performer	Best Comedy Performer
Materharere Hope Haami, Juanita Duncan, Ofa Fotu, Crystal Stacey, Lisa Fa'alafi and Kim 'Busty Beatz' Bowers – Hot Brown Honey (Arts Centre Melbourne and Sydney Opera House in association with Briefs Factory); Jimmy Barnes – Working Class Boy: An Evening of Stories & Songs (Jimmy Barnes, Frontier Touring and in association with Premier Artists); Betty Grumble – Grumble: Sex Clown Saves the World (Don't Be Lonely); Sven Ratzke – Starman (Adelaide Festival Centre's Adelaide Cabaret Festival and Release Creative)	Hannah Gadsby – Nanette (Token Events); Aunty Donna – Big Boys (Century Entertainment); Tom Ballard – Problematic (Token Events); Joel Creasey – Poser (Live Nation Australasia); Nazeem Hussain – Public Frenemy Nazeem Hussain (Live Nation Australasia); Sammy J – Hero Complex (Laughing Stock Productions)
Best Presentation for Children	Best Regional Touring Production
Jump First, Ask Later – Powerhouse Youth Theatre and Force Majeure; Cerita Anak (Child's Play) – Polyglot Theatre and Papermoon Puppet Theatre presented by Arts Centre Melbourne and Asia TOPA; In A Deep Dark Forest – The Inhabitors and Arts Centre Melbourne; New Owner – The Last Great Hunt	Terrain – Bangarra Dance Theatre; CounterMove – Sydney Dance Company and Arts on Tour; The Moon's a Balloon – Patch Theatre Company; They Saw A Thylacine – HUMAN ANIMAL EXCHANGE & Performing Lines

=== Industry ===
Best New Australian Work
Leah Purcell – The Drover's Wife; Busty Beatz and Lisa Fa’alafi – Hot Brown Honey; David Morton – The Wider Earth (Queensland Theatre and Dead Puppet Society); Kate Mulvany – Jasper Jones; Darcy Grant, Elliot Zoerner, Shenton Gregory, Geoff Cobham, Jacob Randell, Jascha Boyce, Simon McClure, Lachlan Binns, Mieke Lizotte, Lewie West, Martin Schreiber, Joanne Curry, Lachlan Harper, Jackson Manson, Triton Tunis-Mitchell and Lewis Rankin – Backbone; Matthew Whittet – Girl Asleep
Best Original Score	Best Music Direction
Iain Grandage and Rahayu Supanggah – Satan Jawa (Arts Centre Melbourne and Melbourne Symphony Orchestra); Paul Kelly & Camille O'Sullivan with Feargal Murray – Ancient Rain (Far and Away Productions in association with Brink Productions, co-commissioned by Melbourne Festival and Adelaide Cabaret Festival); Trey Parker, Matt Stone and Robert Lopez – The Book of Mormon; Rully Shabara and Wukir Suryadi – Attractor	Erin Helyard – Saul; Nicolette Fraillon – Nijinsky; Luke Hunter – Kinky Boots; Chong Lim – Rolling Thunder Vietnam (Blake Entertainment)
Best Scenic Design	Best Costume Design
Anna Cordingley – Jasper Jones; Bob Crowley – Aladdin; Katrin Lea Tag – Saul; David Morton and Aaron Barton – The Wider Earth	Gregg Barnes – Aladdin; Cecil Beaton – My Fair Lady; Jennifer Irwin – OUR land people stories; Tess Schofield – The Drover's Wife
Best Lighting Design	Best Sound Design
Joachim Klein – Saul; Geoff Cobham – Backbone (Gravity & Other Myths); Mark Howett and Sean McKernan – Boorna Waanginy (Perth International Arts Festival); Matthew Marshall – Green Day's American Idiot	Gareth Fry and Pete Malkin – The Encounter (Complicité, Sydney Festival, Malthouse Theatre, Adelaide Festival & Perth International Arts Festival); Tony David Cray – Sydney Opera House – The Opera (The Eighth Wonder) (Opera Australia); Kingsley Reeve – Boorna Waanginy; Michael Waters – My Fair Lady

=== Lifetime Achievement ===
JC Williamson Award	Sue Nattrass Award
Richard Tognetti AO	Rob Brookman AM
