= Wooler (disambiguation) =

Wooler is a small town in Northumberland, England.

Wooler may also refer to:

- Wooler, Ontario, a community in Quinte West, Ontario, Canada
- Wooler (motorcycles), a UK manufacturer of motorcycles and other vehicles
- Wooler (name), a surname (including a list of people with that name)

== See also ==
- Wooller (disambiguation)
