= Pitaya Chin =

Australian author

- Occupation: Author
- Writing career
- Notable work: Revenge

Pitaya Chin, formerly known as S. L. Lim, is an Australian author. They have written three books: The Director and the Daemon, Real Differences and Revenge. In 2021, they became the first non-binary author to be shortlisted for the Stella Prize.

== Career ==
Chin's first novel, Real Differences, was published in 2019. The novel follows a man named Nick and explores themes of multiculturalism and racism. In a review in The Sydney Morning Herald, Kerryn Goldsworthy wrote that the novel had impressive maturity and sophistication for a work by a debut writer. In the Newtown Review of Books, Ann Skea wrote that the novel was immersive and that it prompted the reader to question their cultural assumptions. The novel won the UTS Glenda Adams Award for New Writing at the 2020 New South Wales Premier's Literary Awards.

Chin's second novel, Revenge, was published in 2020. The novel is about a Malaysian woman named Yannie who is forced by her parents to care for them and to work at the family store while her brother Shan is allowed to attend university. After her parents' death, Yannie moves to Australia and attempts to undermine her brother's life. Writing in the Sydney Morning Herald, Kerryn Goldsworthy wrote that the book was a "complex novel about power, money, sexuality and systemic inequality, written with elegance and restraint". A review in The Guardian praised the novel's opening, writing that the author "establishes a tone so true to the emotional core of our heroine it felt like someone pressing on a sharp, sustained wound". In a review in Australian Book Review, Mindy Gill gave a more mixed assessment, writing that the novel's dialogue was stilted in places. A review in the Sydney Review of Books wrote that the novel had some missteps in the characterisation of its protagonist, but praised its exploration of misogyny and colonialism.

Revenge was shortlisted for the Stella Prize, a literary prize established in 2012 for female authors. Chin was the first non-binary author to be shortlisted for the award after a 2019 change to its rules expanded eligibility to include non-binary people and transgender women. The novel was also the winner of the 2022 Barbara Jefferis Award.

Chin's third novel, The Director and the Daemon, was published in 2024. The novel explores the relationship between art and activism through multiple intertwined storylines. In the Sydney Review of Books, described the work as a "fresh, funny and furious work" that provided a scathing condemnation of performative activism. In Meanjin, Alex Gerrans praised the power of Chin's political messaging, but wrote that their writing "moves too quickly to linger in smug cleverness", causing their storylines to "smash together in a big smear." In The Age, the book was described as "stimulating, provocative, and darkly funny".

== Works ==
- Real Differences (Transit Lounge, 2019) ISBN 978-1-925760-28-6
- Revenge (Transit Lounge, 2020) ISBN 978-1-925760-58-3
- The Director and the Daemon (Puncher & Wattman, 2024) ISBN 978-1-923099-16-6
