= Leticia Cáceres =

Australian stage and film director

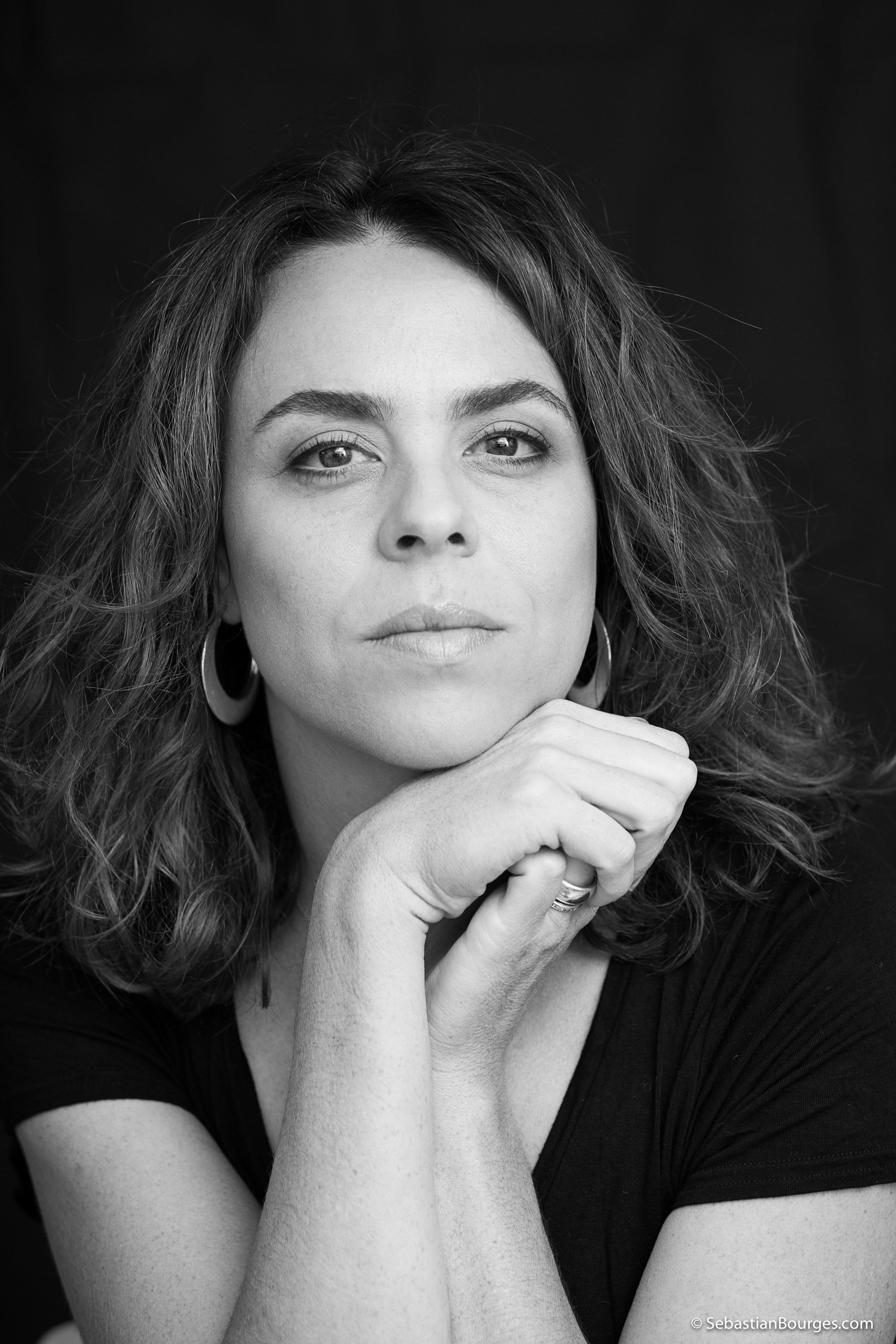
- Born: Argentina
- Citizenship: Argentine; Australian; Italian
- Occupations: Theatre and Film Director, Dramaturge
- Agent: Cameron's Management
- Website: https://leticiacaceres.com/

Leticia Cáceres is an Argentine-born Australian stage and film director. She is co-founder of RealTV theatre company, based in Melbourne.

Cáceres has worked across theatre, television, and film, gaining recognition for her work on productions such as The Drover’s Wife and Bump. In recent years, she has transitioned into television directing, with credits including Spooky Files, Rock Island Mysteries, and Royal Flying Doctors.

Cáceres has also directed several films, including the short Wild, which won the Gold Lion Award for Best First-Time Director at the London Film Awards.

== Early life ==
Cáceres was born in Córdoba, Argentina. Her parents, physicist Carlos Cáceres and computer programmer Maria Cáceres, fled Argentina in 1981 during the Dirty war, seeking refuge in Canada. The family returned to Argentina in 1983 before leaving again in 1989. They initially moved back to Canada, before finally settling in Brisbane, Queensland, in 1991. Cáceres studied drama at Indooroopilly state school.

== Education ==
In 2000, she graduated from the Queensland University of Technology with a bachelor's degree in drama.

She graduated with a Master's of Dramatic Art (Directing) from the Victorian College of the Arts, Melbourne University, in 2014.

== Career ==
Cáceres was associate director for Melbourne Theatre Company from 2013 to 2015, and Artistic Director of Tantrum Youth Arts between 2006 and 2007.

She was the associate director for Queensland Theatre between 2003 and 2005.

Cáceres's screen credits include Wild, which won Best First Time Director at the 2017 London Film Awards, and The True History of Billie The Kid, which was shown at the Melbourne International Film Festival in 2018.

Cáceres work has since transitioned into television. In 2021 and 2022, She directed several episodes of Bump., and worked as a Director's Attachment on Fires. In 2023, she directed episodes of the anthology series Erotic Stories, episodes of Spooky Files . In 2024, she also directed episodes of Rock Island Mysteries, as well as episodes of Royal Flying Doctors.

In 2019, Cáceres became an artist-in-residence at Start VR.

== RealTV ==
Cáceres is co-founder of an independent theatre company called RealTV (also spelt Real TV) with playwright Angela Betzien. Their work for young audiences include: Hoods, which won the multiple awards; War Crimes; and Children of the Black Skirt.

== Awards ==
In 2024, Cáceres was nominated for two AACTA Awards: Best Drama Series for Erotic Stories and Best Direction for Episode 1 of Erotic Stories.

In 2020, Cáceres won the award for Outstanding Direction in the Professional Theatre category at the Tasmanian Theatre Awards, for The Mares.

Cáceres' production of Leah Purcell's The Drover's Wife (Belvoir St Theatre) won four Helpmann Awards including Best Direction and Best Production and four Sydney Theatre Awards including Best Direction and Best Production.

In 2017, she won the Gold Lion Award for Best First-Time Director at the London Film Awards, and the Next Gen Student Film Award at the Melbourne Women in Film Festival, for the short film, Wild. She won the 2015 Best Director Green Room Award for her production of Simon Stephens' Birdland, presented by Melbourne Theatre Company.

In 2008, Cáceres won the award for Best Direction at the Matilda Awards, for Hoods. Hoods also won a Matilda Award for Best Independent Production, the 2007 AWGIE Award for Theatre for Young Audiences and received a 2008 Helpmann nomination;
