= Black Chicks Talking =

Arts project by Australian actress Leah Purcell

- Author: Leah Purcell
- Publisher: Hodder Headline Australia
- Publication date: 2002
- Pages: 363
- ISBN: 0-7336-1070-6

Black Chicks Talking
- Directed by: Brendan Fletcher; Leah Purcell
- Produced by: Brendan Fletcher; Bain Stewart
- Cinematography: Himman Dhamija
- Edited by: Reva Childs
- Production company: Bungabura Productions
- Release date: 2001
- Running time: 52 minutes
- Country: Australia
- Language: English

Black Chicks Talking is an arts project by Australian actress Leah Purcell featuring a 2001 documentary film, a 2002 book, a stage production and an art exhibition. The film is co-directed by Brendan Fletcher and features Indigenous Australian women including Purcell, actress Deborah Mailman and politician Kathryn Hay. Following the book and film, Purcell wrote a fictionalised dramatisation under the same title.

== Book ==
Purcell got the idea for a book featuring interviews of Indigenous Australian women following the success of her semi-autobiographical play Box the Pony. After seeing the play someone suggested that Purcell find other indigenous women to tell their stories. Purcell sought out nine other indigenous women who personally inspired her, some professional, some not. The interviewees comprised politician and former Miss Australia Kathryn Hay, actress Deborah Mailman, netball player Sharon Finnan, United Nations youth delegate Tammy Williams, Rosanna Angus, Cilla Malone, Frances Rings, Lisa Fraser-Gooda and Rachel Perkins. To initiate discussion, Purcell asked each woman the question "Out of the five senses, which one do you relate to and what is your first pleasurable memory of that sense?" Her partner Bain Stewart gave her the idea of filming the interviews and using them as the basis for a documentary. Further interviews were conducted over the telephone, particularly when participants felt uncomfortable opening up on-camera. The interviews explored the topics of identity, family and culture in relation to Indigenous Australian women.

== Film ==
Purcell used the documentary footage of the interviews as the basis for the film. Only five of the women from the book are featured in the film — Hay, Mailman, Williams, Angus and Malone. In addition to the solo interviews conducted for the book, Purcell filmed the women talking over dinner at a restaurant in Sydney. The documentary was finished before the book was published.

== Release and reception ==
The film premiered at the inaugural Tribeca Film Festival and was shown at the Melbourne and Sydney film festivals. It was screened on the Australian network SBS on 30 August 2002. It won the Inside Film Award for Best Documentary. The book was published in June 2002 by Hodder Headline Australia. Realist artist Robert Hannaford painted portraits of each of the ten women which, along with stills from the documentary, made up a travelling art exhibition. A stage adaptation of Black Chicks Talking by Purcell and Sean Mee opened in December 2002. The play is a fictional story with five female characters, one of whom, Elizabeth, is played by Purcell.
