= And Fire Came Down =

2017 crime novel by Emma Viskic

- Author: Emma Viskic
- Language: English
- Series: Caleb Zelic
- Genre: Crime novel
- Publisher: Echo Publishing
- Publication date: 1 August 2017
- Publication place: Australia
- Media type: Print
- Pages: 326
- Awards: 2018 Davitt Award, Best Adult Novel, winner
- ISBN: 9781760402945
- Preceded by: Resurrection Bay
- Followed by: Darkness for Light

And Fire Came Down is a 2017 crime novel by Australian author Emma Viskic. It was originally published in Australia by Echo Publishing.

It is the second installment in the author's Caleb Zelic series of novels, following Resurrection Bay (2015).

The novel was the winner of the Davitt Award for Best Adult Novel in 2018.

== Synopsis ==
Profoundly deaf Caleb Zelic is drawn back to his home town of Resurrection Bay after an encounter with a frightened young woman in an alley in Melbourne. The woman then appears to step in front of oncoming traffic, and Zelic finds a train ticket that takes him back home.

== Critical reception ==
Writing for The Newtown Review of Books Karen Chisholm concluded her review of the book, "With beautifully balanced characterisations, action and setting, and some carefully structured social-justice messaging, everything about And Fire Came Down fits neatly together. Its setting is fictional, but feels real – a small town battling drugs and petty crimes, bored teenagers, and undercurrents of deeply ingrained racism while Aboriginal communities struggle for control of their own futures."

On the ArtsHub website Erich Mayer found that "Caleb is quixotic, obstinate, resilient, tough and too honest for his own good. In his quest to find the killer of a person who died in his arms he overcomes numerous obstacles including some of his own making while at the same time he tries to restore his relationship with his family."

== Publication history ==
After the novel's initial publication by Echo Publishing in Australia in 2017 the novel was reprinted by the same publisher in 2019 and 2023. It was also published in the UK by Pushkin Press in 2018.

== Awards ==
- 2018 Davitt Award – Best Adult Crime Novel, winner

== Notes ==
- Dedication: For Meg and Leni
- Epigraph: And fire came down from heaven and devoured them. Revelation 20:9

== See also ==
- 2017 in Australian literature
