= Dark Horse (Brown novel) =

Crime novel by Honey Brown

- First edition
- Author: Honey Brown
- Language: English
- Genre: Crime fiction
- Publisher: Penguin Books, Australia
- Publication date: 2013
- Publication place: Australia
- English publication date: 24 April 2013
- Media type: Print paperback
- Pages: 280
- Awards: 2014 Davitt Award for Best Adult Novel, winner
- ISBN: 9781921901539
- Preceded by: After the Darkness
- Followed by: Through the Cracks

Dark Horse (2013) is a crime novel by Australian author Honey Brown. It won the Davitt Award for Best Adult Novel in 2014.

== Plot summary ==
On Christmas Day Sarah Barnard escapes her disapproving parents by taking her trusted but damaged black mare Tansy into the Tasmanian mountains. Trapped by a sudden storm she takes shelter but slowly comes to realise that she is not alone.

== Notes ==
- Dedication:

Where is the rich, dark earth, brown and moist?
Where is the smell of rain dripping from gum trees?
-John Marsden, The Rabbits

== Reviews ==
Karen Chisholm in The Newtown Review of Books cited the novel's suspense as a major attraction: "There are a few authors out there who write books that just about guarantee that sleep will be lost, and lights will be left on for quite some time after finishing them, and as with Brown’s previous work, Dark Horse has this effect. The reader knows that not everything will be as it appears. The worry sets in early and doesn’t let up."

Fiona Hardy, for "Readings" bookshop, found herself unnerved by the book: "You’ll second-guess yourself throughout while reading this, and probably never go camping again."

== Awards and nominations ==
- 2014 winner Davitt Award – Best Adult Novel
