= Revenge (Lim novel) =

2020 novel by S.L. Lim

- Author: S.L. Lim
- Genre: Fiction
- Publisher: Transit Lounge
- Publication date: 1 September 2020
- Publication place: Australia
- Pages: 240
- ISBN: 978-1-925760-58-3

Revenge: Murder in Three Parts is a 2020 novel by S.L. Lim. The novel is about a Malaysian woman named Yannie who is forced by her parents to care for them and to work at the family store while her brother Shan is allowed to attend university. After her parents' death, Yannie moves to Australia and attempts to undermine her brother's life. The book won the 2022 Barbara Jefferis Award and was shortlisted for the 2021 Stella Prize.

== Reception ==
Revenge received generally positive reviews. Writing in the Sydney Morning Herald, Kerryn Goldsworthy wrote that the book was a "complex novel about power, money, sexuality and systemic inequality, written with elegance and restraint". A review in The Guardian praised the novel's opening, writing that Lim "establishes a tone so true to the emotional core of our heroine it felt like someone pressing on a sharp, sustained wound". In a review in Australian Book Review, Mindy Gill gave a more mixed assessment, writing that the novel's dialogue was stilted in places. A review in the Sydney Review of Books wrote that the novel had some missteps in the characterisation of its protagonist, but praised its exploration of misogyny and colonialism.

== Awards ==
Awards for Revenge
| Year | Award | Category | Result | Ref. |
|---|---|---|---|---|
| 2022 | Barbara Jefferis Award | — | Won | |
| 2021 | Stella Prize | — | Shortlisted | |
| 2021 | Queensland Literary Awards | The University of Queensland Fiction Book Award | Shortlisted | |
