= Honey Brown =

Australian novelist

- Occupation: Writer
- Writing career
- Language: English
- Years active: 2008–present
- Notable works: Red Queen; Dark Horse
- Notable awards: Aurealis Award; Davitt Award

Honey Brown is an Australian novelist.

== Early life and education ==
Honey Brown grew up in Campbell Town, Tasmania.

She attended Campbell Town High School and Launceston College, Tasmania before moving to Victoria.

== Career ==
Her first novel, Red Queen, was published by Penguin in 2008 and won the Aurealis Award for Best Horror Novel in 2009. With her subsequent novels she was longlisted for the Miles Franklin Award in 2011 for The Good Daughter and won the Davitt Award in 2014 for Dark Horse.

== Personal life ==
In 2000 she was involved in a farming accident which left her partially paralysed and unable to walk.

== Bibliography ==
=== Novels ===
- Red Queen (2008)
- The Good Daughter (2010)
- After the Darkness (2012)
- Dark Horse (2013)
- Through the Cracks (2014)
- Six Degrees: The power of attraction connects us all (2015)

== Awards and nominations ==
- 2009 winner, Aurealis Award for Best Horror Novel – Red Queen
- 2009 highly commended, The Fellowship of Australian Writers Victoria Inc. National Literary Awards – FAW Christina Stead Award – Red Queen
- 2009 finalist, Australian Shadows Award – Long Fiction – Red Queen
- 2011 longlisted, Miles Franklin Award – The Good Daughter
- 2011 shortlisted, Barbara Jefferis Award – The Good Daughter
- 2013 longlisted, Davitt Award – Best Adult Crime Novel – After the Darkness
- 2014 winner, Davitt Award – Best Adult Crime Novel – Dark Horse
- 2015 shortlisted, Davitt Award – Best Adult Crime Novel – Through the Cracks
