= The China Garden =

2009 novel by Australian author Kristina Olsson

- Author: Kristina Olsson
- Language: English
- Genre: Novel
- Publisher: University of Queensland Press
- Publication date: March 2009
- Publication place: Australia
- Media type: Print
- Pages: 281 pp.
- Awards: Barbara Jefferis Award, winner 2010
- ISBN: 9780702236976

The China Garden is a 2009 novel by the Australian author Kristina Olsson.

== Synopsis ==
Laura returns, after many years living overseas, to her coastal home in northern New South Wales to arrange the funeral for her mother Angela.

== Critical reception ==
Writing in The Australian Book Review reviewer Kate McFadyen noted: "There is a symbolic core to The China Garden, but it is far too obvious. Laura has deliberately removed herself from the place of her childhood and all that it represents to her. She works as an arborist among the orchards of Umbria, but her sensitivity is such that she is moved to tears when she prunes fruit trees...A lighter touch might have struck the intended balance between fecundity and menace."

== Publishing history ==
After the novel's initial publication in Australia by University of Queensland Press in 2009, it was reprinted by the same publisher in 2011.

The novel was also translated into German in 2012.

== Awards ==
- Barbara Jefferis Award, 2010, winner
- Nita Kibble Literary Award, 2010, shortlisted
- International Dublin Literary Award, 2010, longlisted

== See also ==
- 2009 in Australian literature
