= Fallen Angels (Australian TV series) =

- Genre: Drama
- Directed by: Geoffrey Bennett; Scott Patterson; Tony Tilse
- Starring: Garry McDonald; Celia De Burgh; Jeremy Ball; Eszter Marosszéky; Brian Vriends; Leah Purcell
- Composer: Guy Gross
- Country of origin: Australia
- Original language: English
- No. of series: 1
- No. of episodes: 20

Production
- Executive producers: Sue Smith; Andy Lloyd James
- Producer: Geoffrey Nottage
- Production location: Sydney
- Editors: Nicole La Macchia; Bill Russo
- Running time: 50 minutes

Original release
- Network: ABC
- Release: 7 February – 27 June 1997

Fallen Angels is an Australian television series, aired by the ABC in 1997. Twenty episodes were produced, portraying a community legal centre in Endeavour Park, a fictional western suburb of Sydney, and the interesting clients represented by its overworked lawyers.

== Cast ==
=== Main / regular ===
- Garry McDonald as Malcolm Lucas
- Celia De Burgh as Erica Michaels
- Brian Vriends as Nick Swan
- Leah Purcell as Sharon Walker
- Jeremy Ball as Warren Harvey
- Eszter Marosszéky as Anita Malouf

=== Recurring ===
- Anthony Hayes as Roach
- Geoff Morrell as Jack Landers
- Richard Carter as Craig Douglas
- Simon Chilvers as Bernie Levinson
- Terry Serio as Cosimo Mazzoni

=== Guests ===
- Aaron Blabey as Jim Phelps
- Angelo D'Angelo as Lorenzo Mazzoni
- Bill Hunter as Frank Scraggs
- Claudia Karvan as Yvonne
- Danny Roberts as Quentin
- George Spartels as Dan Playhard
- Grant Dodwell as Paul
- Joanne Samuel as Helen Bader
- Joel Edgerton as Scoob
- John Waters as Bob Tognetti
- Kieran Darcy-Smith as Hoon
- Kris McQuade as Jude
- Ling-Hsueh Tang as Rose
- Luke Carroll as Chris
- Matt Doran as Steve
- Melissa Jaffer as Marion
- Nash Edgerton as Hoon / Wilderness Society Koala
- Noeline Brown as Sister Bernadette
- Ron Haddrick as Cec Fowler
- Rose Byrne as Siobhan
- Simon Westaway as Eddie Hallat
- Toni Lamond as Irene Lucas

== Season 1 (1997) ==
No. overall	No. in season	Title	Directed by	Written by	Original release date
1	1	"In Defence of Electricity"	Unknown	Unknown	7 February 1997
2	2	"Hair"	Unknown	Unknown	14 February 1997
3	3	"Smoke Gets in Your Eyes"	Unknown	Unknown	21 February 1997
4	4	"A Woman of a Certain Age"	Unknown	Unknown	28 February 1997
5	5	"Vote for Birdy"	Unknown	Unknown	7 March 1997
6	6	"All Things Bright and Beautiful"	Unknown	Unknown	14 March 1997
7	7	"Lerve, Lerve, Lerve"	Unknown	Unknown	21 March 1997
8	8	"Snow on the Rock"	Unknown	Unknown	28 March 1997
9	9	"Baby it's You"	Unknown	Chris Hawkshaw	4 April 1997
10	10	"Bury My Heart in Endeavour Park"	Unknown	Unknown	11 April 1997
11	11	"Forty in the Shade"	Unknown	Chris Hawkshaw	18 April 1997
12	12	"Slip Sliding Away"	Unknown	Unknown	25 April 1997
13	13	"The Faust Lane"	Unknown	Unknown	2 May 1997
14	14	"Love Is in the Air"	Unknown	Unknown	9 May 1997
15	15	"Pig in Shit"	Unknown	Unknown	16 May 1997
16	16	"The Promised Land"	Unknown	Unknown	23 May 1997
17	17	"Chinese Whispers"	Unknown	Unknown	30 May 1997
18	18	"Take a Chance, Lose Your Pants: Part 1"	Unknown	Unknown	13 June 1997
19	19	"Take a Chance, Lose Your Pants: Part 2"	Unknown	Unknown	20 June 1997
20	20	"Morning Has Broken"	Unknown	Unknown	27 June 1997

== See also ==
- List of Australian television series
