= Wooller =

Wooller is a surname. Notable people with the surname include:

- Robert Wooller (1817–?), English cricketer
- Wilf Wooller (1912–1997), Welsh cricketer and rugby player
- Fred Wooller (born 1938), Australian rules footballer
- Jeff Wooller (born 1940), English accountant
- Geraldine Wooller (born 1941), Australian novelist
- Lukas Wooller, English songwriter, record producer, and musician

== See also ==
- Wooler (name)
