= Between a Wolf and a Dog =

2016 novel by Australian author Georgia Blain

- Author: Georgia Blain
- Language: English
- Genre: Literary novel
- Publisher: Scribe
- Publication date: April 2016
- Publication place: Australia
- Media type: Print
- Pages: 257 pp.
- Awards: 2016 Queensland Literary Awards for Fiction, winner; 2017 Victorian Premier's Prize for Fiction, winner
- ISBN: 9781925321111

Between a Wolf and a Dog is a 2016 novel by the Australian author Georgia Blain. It was the author's last novel.

It was the winner of the 2016 Queensland Literary Awards for Fiction, and the 2017 Victorian Premier's Prize for Fiction.

== Synopsis ==
The novel takes place on one rainy day in Sydney when 70-year-old Hilary, who is dying of cancer, makes a decision about how and when she will die. A decision that she has to discuss with her daughters Ester and April, who have their own problems.

== Critical reception ==
Jo Case, reviewing the book for Australian Book Review noted "Blain has an affinity for domestic realism with a dark edge and an unstinting eye: she is fascinated by the faultlines in relationships and the turning points in individual lives that are more visible in retrospect than in the moment. She is also good at social context, weaving the details that reflect our times into the fabric of her characters and stories." She concluded: "What is a good life? How do you recognise a relationship that has expired, and how do you know when to keep working at it? How might we resolve the tension between what we want and what we should want?"

While reviewing the books shortlisted for the 2017 Stella Prize for The Conversation, Camilla Nelson commented: "Blain is a quietly profound writer with an astonishing eye for the ways in which human beings hurt and heal one another."

== Publishing history ==
After the novel's initial publication by Scribe in 2016, it was reprinted by the same publisher in 2024.

== Notes ==
- Dedication: For Rosie and Anne, Odessa and Andrew

== Awards ==
- 2016 Queensland Literary Awards for Fiction, winner
- 2017 Victorian Premier's Prize for Fiction, winner
- 2017 Stella Prize, shortlisted

== See also ==
- 2016 in Australian literature
