= The Submerged Cathedral (novel) =

2004 novel by Charlotte Wood

- Author: Charlotte Wood
- Language: English
- Genre: Novel
- Publisher: Vintage Books, Australia
- Publication date: 2004
- Publication place: Australia
- Media type: Print (Paperback)
- Pages: 302 pp
- ISBN: 1-74051-264-2
- OCLC: 57169214
- Dewey Decimal: 823/.92 22
- LC Class: PR9619.3.W625 S83 2004
- Preceded by: Pieces of a Girl
- Followed by: The Children

The Submerged Cathedral is a 2004 novel by Australian author Charlotte Wood.

== Reviews ==
Reviewing the Miles Franklin Award shortlist, The Age reviewer noted: "The Submerged Cathedral is a tender and sustained tribute to romantic passion; the kind of enduring love that survives all manifestations of malevolent fate...This is no saccharine boy-meetgirl soapie, but an intensely evocative tale framed by the Australian landscape and suffused with religious pathos."

== Awards ==
Year	Award	Category	Result	Ref
2005	Commonwealth Writers' Prize	South East Asia and South Pacific Region	Shortlisted	
2005	Miles Franklin Award	—	Shortlisted	
