= Patrick Holland (author) =

Australian writer

Patrick Gordon Holland
- Born: 7 August 1977 (age 49); Isaac River, Queensland, Australia
- Occupations: Novelist, short story writer, essayist
- Writing career
- Language: English, Chinese, Vietnamese

Patrick Gordon Holland is an Australian novelist and short story writer who has won several literary awards for his works about Australian bushrangers and Asian culture.

== Biography ==
Holland grew up in outback Australia working as a horseman for local station owners. He later moved to Brisbane, Queensland, where he attained his PhD at Queensland University of Technology, researching non-place, sacred place and Japanese religio-aesthetics.

Holland is an assistant professor of humanities and creative writing at Hong Kong Baptist University. He is a founding member of the Asia Pacific Writers and Translators Association and was a judge of the 2016 Commonwealth Short Story Prize.

== Literature ==
Holland's writing is influenced by Greek Orthodoxy, to which he converted, and his experiences working in Asia and outback Australia. He has described his writing style as minimalist, and also 'ambient' with reference to Japanese literature, in particular the works of Yasunari Kawabata and Yuki Kurita.

- The Mary Smokes Boys (Transit Lounge, 2010), is a novel about a band of young disenfranchised horse thieves and the young sister of one of them. The novel employs a prose technique based on Arvo Pärt's tintinnabuli technique of musical composition and Biblical dirges. It was longlisted for the Miles Franklin Award and shortlisted for the Age Book of the Year Award.
- The Source of the Sound (Salt, 2010) is a short story collection that won Salt Publishing's 2010 Scott Prize and was shortlisted for the Steele Rudd Award.
- The Darkest Little Room (Transit Lounge, 2012), is a novel about human trafficking set in Ho Chi Minh City.
- Navigatio (Transit Lounge, 2014) is a novelistic meditation on the Navigatio Sancti Brendani Abbatis (or The Journey of St Brendan (circa AD 900)), which assumes the form of a semi-ordered collection of Medieval manuscripts.
- One (Transit Lounge, 2016) is a novel that imagines the final days of the Kenniff brothers, Australia's last bushrangers, on their escapades in Western Queensland. The novel was longlisted for the 2018 International Dublin Literary Award.
