= Ouyang Yu =

Chinese-Australian writer and translator

- Born: (Chinese: 歐陽昱; 1955 (age 70–71); Huangzhou, China
- Occupation: Poet

Ouyang Yu (Chinese: 歐陽昱; born 1955) is a contemporary Chinese Australian author, translator and academic.

== Early life and education ==
Ouyang Yu was born in the People's Republic of China, arriving in Australia in 1991 to study for a Ph. D. at La Trobe University, which he completed in 1995.

== Career ==
Ouyang's literary output has been prodigious. Apart from several collections of poetry and a novel he has translated authors as diverse as Christina Stead, Xavier Herbert, Germaine Greer, and David Malouf.

He also edits (or edited) Otherland, a bilingual English-Chinese literary journal.

Yu's poem "New Accents" is one of the prescribed texts in Module A of the HSC subject, English Standard.

== Recognition and awards ==
In 2015 Ouyang was shortlisted for the New South Wales Premier's Literary Awards Translation Prize,

In 2019 his poem "New Accents" was included as a prescribed text for English Standard.

In 2021 he won the Judith Wright Calanthe Award for a Poetry Collection at the Queensland Literary Awards for Terminally Poetic.

Also in 2021, he was a finalist for the Writer's Prize in the Melbourne Prize for Literature.

== Bibliography ==
=== Poetry ===
- Moon Over Melbourne and other Poems (Papyrus Publishing, 1995) ISBN 1-875934-04-9
- Songs of the Last Chinese Poet (Wild Peony, 1997) ISBN 0-9586526-4-3
- Two Hearts, Two Tongues and Rain-Coloured Eyes (University of Hawaii, 2002) ISBN 1-876957-02-6
- New and Selected Poems (Salt, 2004) ISBN 1-876857-35-8
- Listening To (Vagabond Press, 2006)
- Reality Dreams (Picaro Press, 2008)
- The Kingsbury Tales (Brandl and Schlesinger, 2008)
- Terminally Poetic (Ginninderra, 2020) ISBN 9781760419516

=== Novels ===
- Fen nu de Wu Zili (Otherland, 1999)
- The Eastern Slope Chronicle (Brandl & Schlesinger, 2002) ISBN 1-876040-42-4
- The English Class (Transit Lounge, 2010)
- Loose: A Wild History (Wakefield Press, 2011)
- Diary of a Naked Official (Transit Lounge, 2014)
- A Lonely Night Boat (Liehairen, 2016)
- Billy Sing: A Novel (Transit Lounge, 2017)
- Ta : yibu guanyu xiaoshuo de xiaoshuo (Showwe Publishing, 2017)
- Lüse : Vol I (Showwe Publishing, 2018)
- Lüse : Vol II (Showwe Publishing, 2019)
- All the Rivers Run South (Puncher and Wattmann, 2023)

=== Selected non-fiction ===
- On the Smell of an Oily Rag: Speaking English, Thinking Chinese and Living Australian (Wakefield Press, 2008) ISBN 978-1-86254-765-0
- Chinese in Australian Fiction, 1888–1988 (Cambria Press, 2008) ISBN 9781604975161
- "Lower downs, rubbish and low poetry". Overland. 194: 43–46. Autumn 2009.
- "You in the I": The Chinese-Australian writer Ouyang Yu speaks to Prem Poddar, Beyond the Yellow Pale: Essays and Criticism, (Otherland Publishing, 2010)
