= Aaron Smith (author) =

British author, freelance journalist and newspaper editor

- Born: United Kingdom
- Education: Masters in Journalism from University of Tasmania
- Occupations: Author; freelance journalist; newspaper editor
- Writing career
- Language: English
- Notable works: Shanti Bloody Shanti, An Indian Odyssey; Chasing El Dorado, a South American Adventure

Aaron Smith is an author, freelance journalist and newspaper editor who writes for a range of print and online publications. His works have appeared in publications around the world. He has had two nonfiction books published in Australia, New Zealand, USA and the UK.

== Biography ==
Aaron Smith was born in the UK and grew up in Tasmania, Australia. After studying environmental science at Monash University in Melbourne, Australia, he worked as an actor and playwright in Melbourne, with productions in the 2003 Melbourne Comedy and 2002 Melbourne Fringe Festivals

While traveling Asia and Latin America between 2005 and 2009, Smith started writing travel articles. Upon returning to Australia in 2009, Smith completed a master's degree in journalism from the University of Tasmania and now writes for various publications. His magazine articles have appeared in various print publications, including Australian Geographic Magazine, Australian Traveller and Griffith Review.

Smith is the editor of a regional weekly newspaper, the Torres News in Torres Strait, in the far north of Queensland, Australia, where he lives with his wife and daughter.

He won a Queensland Clarion Journalism Award for Indigenous Issues Reporting in 2014.

== Bibliography ==
Smith's debut book, Shanti Bloody Shanti, An Indian Odyssey was released in Australia and New Zealand in November 2011 by Transit Lounge Publishing.

The second edition of Shanti Bloody Shanti, An Indian Odyssey was released in the UK and USA in 2013 by Roaring Forties Press.

Smith has appeared at Literary Festivals talking about his book, including Christchurch Writers Festival 2012 and San Francisco's 2013 LitQuake Festival

Smith's second book, Chasing El Dorado, a South American Adventure was published in 2014 in Australia and New Zealand by Transit Lounge Publishing.
