= The Good Daughter (novel) =

2010 crime novel by Honey Brown

- Author: Honey Brown
- Language: English
- Genre: Crime fiction
- Publisher: Penguin Books, Australia
- Publication date: 2010
- Publication place: Australia
- Media type: Print paperback
- Pages: 291
- ISBN: 9780670074433
- Preceded by: Red Queen
- Followed by: After the Darkness

The Good Daughter (2010) is a crime novel by Australian author Honey Brown. It was shortlisted for the Barbara Jefferis Award and longlisted for the Miles Franklin Award in 2011.

== Premise ==
In the peaceful rural town of Kiona, Zach Kincaid's wealthy mother goes missing and Rebecca Toyer, daughter of a local truckie, becomes implicated in the disappearance.

== Critical reception ==
Susan Ballyn in Reviews in Australian Studies was impressed with the steady build-up of tension in the novel: "The story is beautifully written, setting a fast pace of events against the backdrop of long summer days. Honey Brown alerts the senses with descriptions of these long days, dipping gently into the night which gives an increased sense of urgency to the events as they unfold."

== Awards and nominations ==
- 2011 shortlisted Barbara Jefferis Award
- 2011 longlisted Miles Franklin Award
