= Kristina Olsson =

Australian writer

- Born: 1956 (age 69–70)
- Occupations: Novelist, journalist, teacher
- Writing career
- Genres: General fiction and non fiction
- Website: www.kristinaolsson.net

Kristina Olsson (born 1956) is an Australian writer, journalist and teacher. She is a recipient of the Barbara Jefferis Award, Queensland Literary Award, and Nita Kibble Literary Award.

== Early life ==
Kristina Olsson was raised in Brisbane, Australia of Swedish and Australian heritage.

== Career ==
Olsson studied journalism at the University of Queensland and went on to write for The Australian, The Courier-Mail and Sunday Mail, the Sydney Sunday Telegraph and Griffith Review.

Her first novel In One Skin was published by the University of Queensland Press in 2001. This was followed by the biography Kilroy Was Here, which told the story of prison reformer Debbie Kilroy OAM. In 2010 her novel The China Garden won the Barbara Jefferis Award, which is offered annually for Australian novels which depict women and girls positively, or empower the position of women in society.

Kristina's nonfiction work Boy, Lost: A Family Memoir won the 2013 Queensland Literary Award for Best Nonfiction and the Nita Kibble Literary Award. It was shortlisted for the Victorian Premier's Literary Award, the New South Wales Premier's Literary Award, the Stella Prize and the Australian Human Rights Commission Literature Award.

Olsson has also worked as a government advisor, and as a teacher of creative writing and journalism. She supervises and mentors post-graduate writing students and also works as a manuscript assessor and editor.

== Books ==
=== Fiction ===
- In One Skin (2001) ISBN 978-0-7022-3271-8
- Kilroy Was Here (2005) ISBN 978-1-86325-447-2
- The China Garden (2009) ISBN 978-0-7022-3697-6
- Shell (2018) ISBN 978-1-9256-8532-9

=== Non-fiction ===
- Boy, lost: a family memoir (2013) ISBN 978-0-7022-4953-2

== Awards and nominations ==
=== Prizes ===
- 2010 — Barbara Jefferis Award for The China Garden
- 2013 — Queensland Literary Awards: Nonfiction Book Award for Boy, Lost: A Family Memoir
- 2014 — Nita Kibble Literary Award for Boy, Lost: A Family Memoir

=== Shortlisted ===
- 2010 — Nita Kibble Literary Award for The China Garden
- 2019 — Queensland Literary Awards: The University of Queensland Non-Fiction Book Award for Shell

=== Longlisted ===
- 2020 — International Dublin Literary Award for Shell
