= The Weekend (novel) =

2019 novel by Charlotte Wood

- Author: Charlotte Wood
- Genre: Fiction
- Publisher: Allen & Unwin
- Publication date: October 2019
- Publication place: Australia
- Pages: 272
- ISBN: 9781760292010

The Weekend is a 2019 novel by Australian author Charlotte Wood. The novel explores how a group of elderly women respond to the death of one of their close friends. The novel was written as part of Wood's fellowship as Writer in Residence at the Charles Perkins Centre, where she was engaged to write about the issue of aging.

== Summary ==
The novel follows a group of four friends in their 70s — former restaurant owner Jude, writer Wendy, actress Adele, and Sylvie. The novel unfolds over the course of a single Christmas weekend shortly after Sylvie's death. Her three friends spend the weekend at her beach house cleaning out her belongings, where they process their grief and experience tensions in their friendship.

== Reception ==
The Weekend received positive reviews. In a review in the Sydney Review of Books, Sophia Barnes praised Wood's compelling characterisation of the three women. Kerryn Goldsworthy described Wood's technique as "masterly" in a review in the Sydney Morning Herald, praising both the quality of her writing and her exploration of the "precarious nature of womanhood". In a review in The Observer, Holly Williams wrote that the book was an enjoyable read, but that it focused more on the negatives of aging and friendship than on the joys. The novel was described in The Times as a "warm, wise story about friendship", and received positive reviews in both The Guardian and The Guardian Australia.

== Adaptation ==
The Weekend was adapted into a play by Australian playwright Sue Smith. The play debuted in 2023 at the Belvoir Street Theatre in Sydney, directed by Sarah Goodes and starring Belinda Giblin as Adele, Toni Scanlan as Jude and Melita Jurisic as Wendy. The theatre adaptation received positive reviews in The Guardian and Australian Book Review.

== Awards ==
Awards for The Weekend
Year	Award	Category	Result	Ref.
2020	Indie Book Awards	Fiction Book of the Year	Shortlisted	
2020	Australian Book Industry Awards	Literary Fiction Book of the Year	Won	
2020	Stella Prize	—	Shortlisted	
2020	Miles Franklin Literary Award	—	Longlisted	
2020	ALS Gold Medal	—	Shortlisted	
2020	Prime Minister's Literary Awards	Fiction	Shortlisted	
2021	New South Wales Premier's Literary Awards	Christina Stead Prize for Fiction	Shortlisted	
