= Feather Man =

Book by Rhyll McMaster

- First edition
- Author: Rhyll McMaster
- Language: English
- Genre: Novel
- Publisher: Brandl and Schlesinger, Australia
- Publication date: 2007
- Publication place: Australia
- Media type: Print Paperback
- Pages: 309
- ISBN: 9781876040833

Feather Man (2007) is a novel by Australian author Rhyll McMaster. It won the inaugural Barbara Jefferis Award for Best Novel in 2008.

== Plot summary ==
This is a coming-of-age novel that follows the story of Sooky from a Brisbane suburb in the 1950s until her adulthood in London in the 1970s.

== Reviews ==
Kerryn Goldsworthy in The Australian stated: "This novel is essentially a Bildungsroman, in which a young person grows up and learns about the ways of the world, but here it's enlivened by a genuine mystery, a slender but powerful narrative thread working away deep in the background of the story." She concluded: "Feather Man is not a pleasant or reassuring book, but it's written with great confidence and lyrical intensity, and most Australian readers will recognise in its pages something of their own time and place."

== Awards and nominations ==
- 2007 shortlisted Victorian Premier's Literary Awards – The Vance Palmer Prize for Fiction
- 2008 winner Barbara Jefferis Award
- 2008 winner New South Wales Premier's Literary Awards – UTS Award for New Writing
