= Lucy Treloar =

Australian novelist

- Born: Malaysia
- Occupation: Novelist
- Writing career
- Language: English
- Years active: 2003 – Present
- Notable work: Salt Creek (2015)
- Notable awards: Dobbie Literary Award (2016) Barbara Jefferis Award (2020), (2024)

Lucy Treloar is an Australian novelist.

== Education ==
Treloar was born in Malaysia, grew up in England and Sweden, before moving to Melbourne, Victoria. She has a BA (Hons) in fine arts from the University of Melbourne and a diploma of professional writing and editing from Royal Melbourne Institute of Technology.

== Literary career ==
In 2014 she won the Pacific regional prize in the Commonwealth Short Story Prize for her short story "The Dog and the Sea".

Her first novel, Salt Creek, won the 2016 Dobbie Literary Award and was shortlisted for the 2016 Miles Franklin Award and the 2016 Walter Scott Prize. Her second novel, Wolfe Island, won the 2020 Barbara Jefferis Award and was shortlisted for both the Christina Stead Prize for Fiction and the Prime Minister's Literary Award for Fiction in 2020. Her third novel was joint winner of the Barbara Jefferis Award in 2024 and was shortlisted for the 2025 Christina Stead Prize for Fiction.

== Works ==
=== Books ===
- Treloar, Lucy (2015). Salt Creek. Picador Australia. ISBN 978-1-74353-903-3.
- Treloar, Lucy (2019). Wolfe Island. Pan Macmillan Australia. ISBN 978-1-76055-315-9.
- Treloar, Lucy (2023). Days of Innocence and Wonder. Pan Macmillan Australia. ISBN 978-1-76098-273-7.

=== Essay ===
- "Writing the Apocalypse", in Meanjin, vol. 79, no. 2, June 2020, pages 26–36

=== Short stories ===
- "The Dog and the Sea"
- "In the Park"
- "Wrecking Ball"
- "Natural Selection"
