= Box the Pony =

Box the Pony is a 1997 play co-written by Australian actress Leah Purcell and Scott Rankin. It is a semi-autobiographical one-woman show, set in an Aboriginal community in Queensland. It has played at Sydney's Belvoir Street Theatre, the Sydney Opera House, the 1999 Edinburgh Festival and in 2000 at the Barbican in London.

== Awards ==
- 2000 – Queensland Premier's Literary Awards Drama Script (Stage) Award, accepted by Leah Purcell and Scott Rankin
