= Georgia Blain =

Australian writer

- Born: Georgia Frances Elise Blain; 12 December 1964; Sydney, Australia
- Died: 9 December 2016 (aged 51); Australia
- Occupations: Novelist; Journalist, author

Georgia Frances Elise Blain (12 December 1964 – 9 December 2016) was an Australian novelist, journalist and biographer.

== Biography ==
Born in Sydney in 1964 to journalist and broadcaster Anne Deveson (d. 2016) and broadcaster Ellis Blain (d. 1978), Georgia Blain completed an arts degree at the University of Adelaide before returning to Sydney where she studied law at the University of Sydney. She worked as a journalist commencing work in 1990 as a lawyer with the Australian Copyright Council and wrote many articles for their Bulletin (ISSN 0311-2934).

Her first novel was Closed for Winter. One of her most recent works Births, Deaths and Marriages, a memoir of her childhood, was short-listed for the 2009 Nita Kibble Literary Award.

The draft of Closed for Winter 1996 earned her an Australian Society of Authors' mentorship with Rosie Scott. She later commented that without this relationship and guidance she may not have completed the novel.

When editing Between a Wolf and a Dog in 2015 Blain was diagnosed with brain cancer. A diagnosis which mirrored the story of Hilary, one of the main characters in the novel.

Novelist Charlotte Wood called Between a Wolf and a Dog

a novel of devastating clarity that traverses Blain's familiar terrain: the ordinary sadnesses in families, betrayal and forgiveness, the small, potent beauties of daily life that we allow to slip unnoticed through our fingers". In all her books Blain ruminates on families, siblings, loss, death, marriages and partnerships, in prose of stunning clarity and penetrating insight. Her writing is superbly paced and structured, and she has a gift for conjuring beaches, bush, and the suburbs of Sydney and Adelaide.

For Blain's obituary in The Sydney Morning Herald, Jane Gleeson-White wrote that she was "[a]cclaimed as a novelist, short story writer and essayist who transformed the everyday into works of extraordinary beauty and clarity."

Blain wrote a regular column for The Saturday Paper about her experiences with brain cancer.

She completed a draft of a final work before her death, a memoir entitled The Museum of Words, published by Scribe in 2017.

== Bibliography ==
=== Novels ===
- Closed for winter. Penguin. 1998.
- Candelo Penguin, 1999
- The Blind Eye Penguin 2001
- Names for Nothingness Picador, 2004
- Darkwater Random House, 2010
- Too Close to Home Random House, 2011
- Snake in the Grass Random House, 2012
- Special Random House, 2016
- Between a Wolf and a Dog Scribe, 2016

=== Short fiction ===
Collections

- The secret lives of men. Scribe. 2013.
- We all lived in Bondi then. Scribe. 2024.
- Far From Home. Scribe. 2024.

=== Selected non-fiction ===
- "The Germaine tape". Granta. 70: 263–275. Summer 2000.
- Births Deaths Marriages: True Tales. Vintage. 2008. ISBN 978-1741668605.
- The Museum of Words: A Memoir of Language, Writing, and Mortality, Scribe, 2017, ISBN 9781925322255

=== Selected critical studies and reviews of Blain's work ===
The secret lives of men

- O'Dea, Denise (April 2013). "None of a type". Australian Book Review. 350: 23.

== Filmography ==
- Closed for Winter (2009) adapted by Georgia Blain and James Bogle

== Awards ==
=== Closed for Winter ===
1999 named as one of the Sydney Morning Herald's Best Young Novelists

=== Births Deaths Marriage ===
2009 Shortlisted for the Nita B. Kibble Literary Award

=== Darkwater ===
2012 Shortlisted Adelaide Festival Awards for Literature Young Adult

=== The Secret Lives of Men ===
2014 Shortlisted Christina Stead Prize for Fiction NSW Premier's Literary Awards

2014 Longlisted for the Nita B. Kibble Literary Award

=== Between a Wolf and a Dog ===
2016 Winner The University of Queensland Fiction Book Award (Queensland Literary Award)

2017 Winner Victorian Premier's Literary Awards.

2017 Shortlisted ALS Gold Medal.

2017 Longlisted Australian Book Industry Awards

== Personal life ==
Born in Sydney in 1964 to journalist and broadcaster Anne Deveson and broadcaster Ellis Blain. She had two brothers, Jonathan (was diagnosed with schizophrenia and died by suicide) and Joshua. Her childhood was spent in various cities and the family moved to Sydney, Tuscany and Adelaide, where she completed a Bachelor of Arts at the University of Adelaide.

In 1998 she and her partner Andrew Taylor welcomed daughter Odessa.

Her writing was influenced by the difficult relationship of her mother and the children with father Ellis Blain. "His presence alone created tension; it was the threat of what he might do that kept us tiptoeing, scared, around him, ... Blain had long terrorised the home he shared with one of the country's best-known feminists with the threat and practice of physical violence ".

Georgia Blain died on 9 December 2016 from brain cancer which had been diagnosed in November 2015. Her mother, Anne Deveson, died three days later on 12 December.
