= The Wider Earth =

Play by David Morton

The Wider Earth is a play by David Morton, a fictionalised account of Charles Darwin's five-year journey and encounters on HMS Beagle.

The original production opened in Brisbane at the Bille Brown Studio in 2016, directed and designed by Morton and produced by Queensland Theatre and Morton's company Dead Puppet Society. It incorporated puppets and other visual theatre elements. The Wider Earth was also performed at the Sydney Opera House. It was nominated for Best New Australian Work and Best Set Design at the 2017 Helpmann Awards.

A London production was presented by the National History Museum in a temporary theatre in the Jerwood Gallery.

== Awards ==
It was nominated for Best Entertainment and Family at the 2019 Olivier Awards.
