= Wooler (name) =

Wooler is a surname. Notable people with the surname include:

- Bob Wooler (1926–2002), Liverpool DJ associated with The Beatles
- Charles Wooler (1930–2017), Rhodesia cricketer
- John Wooler (born 1958), active within the English music industry
- Thomas Jonathan Wooler (1786–1853), British Radical

== See also ==
- Wooller, a surname
