= Farewell to the Father =

2016 memoir by Tim Elliott

- Author: Tim Elliott
- Language: English
- Published: PanMcMillan
- Publication place: Australia
- English publication date: 2016

Farewell to the Father is a 2016 Australian memoir written by journalist Tim Elliott. It deals with his childhood experiences with his father, who suffered from mental illness. The book has its origins in an article in the Sydney Morning Herald's Good Weekend magazine.
