= Emma Viskic =

Australian novelist and musician

- Occupation: Author
- Writing career
- Period: 2015–present
- Genre: Crime fiction

Emma Viskic is an Australian novelist and musician.

== Biography ==
Viskic grew up near the Melbourne suburb of Frankston. Her father is from Dalmatia and her mother is Irish-Australian from Tasmania.

Viskic won the Ned Kelly Award for Best First Fiction in 2016 for Resurrection Bay and the Davitt Awards for Best Adult Novel, Best Debut Novel and readers' choice, as well as the Davitt Award for Best Adult Novel in 2018 for And Fire Came Down.

The Caleb Zelic series has been optioned for television adaptation in the US.

=== Personal life ===
She is married with two grown daughters.

Viskic trained in classical clarinet at the Victorian College of the Arts and the Rotterdam Conservatorium in The Netherlands before working as a chamber musician, including performing with José Carreras and Kiri Te Kanawa.

== Bibliography ==
=== Caleb Zelic Series ===
- Resurrection Bay (2015)
- And Fire Came Down (2017)
- Darkness for Light (2019)
- Those Who Perish (2022)
