= The Drover's Wife (film) =

2021 film by Leah Purcell

- Theatrical release poster
- Directed by: Leah Purcell
- Screenplay by: Leah Purcell
- Produced by: Bain Stewart; David Jowsey; Angela Littlejohn; Greer Simpkin; Leah Purcell
- Starring: Leah Purcell; Rob Collins; Sam Reid; Jessica De Gouw
- Cinematography: Mark Wareham
- Edited by: Dany Cooper
- Music by: Salliana Seven Campbell
- Production companies: Oombarra Productions; Bunya Productions
- Distributed by: Roadshow Films
- Release dates: 18 March 2021 (SXSW); 5 May 2022 (Australia)
- Running time: 109 minutes
- Country: Australia
- Language: English
- Budget: $7.2 million

The Drover's Wife: The Legend of Molly Johnson, or simply The Drover's Wife, is a 2021 Australian revisionist Western film directed, written, and co-produced by Leah Purcell in her feature directorial debut. It is an adaptation of Purcell's 2016 play and a reimagining of Henry Lawson's 1892 short story. The film stars Purcell, Rob Collins, Sam Reid, and Jessica De Gouw. It tells the story of a woman and her stubborn determination to protect her family from the harshness of a life in 1893 in the Snowy Mountains.

The film had its world premiere at South by Southwest on 18 March 2021, and was released in Australia on 5 May 2022, by Roadshow Films. It received generally positive reviews from critics, who praised Purcell's direction and screenplay, as well as the performances of the cast (particularly those of Purcell, Collins, and De Gouw). It garnered thirteen nominations, including Best Film, at the 12th AACTA Awards, with Purcell winning Best Lead Actress.

== Plot ==
The film opens with a scene in which Molly Johnson (Leah Purcell), heavily pregnant, shoots a stray bull which has wandered near her home, after ensuring that her four children are safe.

Shortly afterwards the district's new sergeant of police, Nate Klintoff (Sam Reid), turns up with his sickly wife, Louisa (Jessica De Gouw). They smell the meat cooking and beg for some, as they had lost all of their provisions when crossing the river. She gives them food in exchange for their taking her children into town for safekeeping until her new baby is born, and so that Danny, the eldest son, can get more supplies.

Meanwhile, the wife and children of the area's founding family are found dead, and an educated Aboriginal man called Yadaka (Rob Collins) is blamed and is a wanted man. After Molly returns from a walk, she finds Yadaka face down in the yard. She has contractions, signaling the impending birth of her baby. Yadaka begins to attack Molly, but stops when her waters break and helps her instead. The baby does not survive, and Yadaka assists in burying it.

Yadaka stays at the cottage, doing odd jobs for Molly, and teaches Danny how to throw a spear, using a long stick.

As the police concentrate on finding Yadaka, they ask the townspeople if they have seen him. During the investigation, they become increasingly suspicious of Molly's husband Joe's disappearance, as he didn't turn up for the drove.

The judge welcomes Nate to the town and says if he makes it to Sunday he will swear him in. Nate is applauded when he breaks up a fight. At the station, two drovers, Robert Parsens (Tony Cogin) and John McPharlen (Trevor Greenwood), are released from lockup and reveal that Joe had never missed a drove in eight years. Klintoff sends Trooper Leslie to investigate Molly's homestead, and during a confrontation, Leslie is shot and killed after telling Molly she is to be questioned over Joe's disappearance.

In town, Miss Shirley (Maggie Dence), who was minding Molly's children, discusses with Father McGuiness and Judge Eisenmangher Molly's Ngarigo heritage, as a daughter of "Black Mary". Declaring the children 'octaroons', an order is signed for the children to be taken into state custody "for their own protection".

Molly refuses to answer for why Joe has disappeared but later reveals to Yadaka that she killed him. Later that night Molly is attacked by Joe's drover mates Robert and John, who have come to investigate Joe's disappearance. Robert punches Yadaka in the face after noticing that he is wearing Joe's boots. Molly defends Yadaka, saying that she gave him the boots as payment for work he had done. Robert doesn't believe her, saying he overhead Molly telling Yadaka she had killed Joe and doesn't know why. As Molly tries to protect herself she is assaulted, and tie Yadaka up, while Danny watches from afar. Molly wakes in the night to find Danny had dragged her into the house, and Yadaka hanged by the drovers. She lies to Danny that his father died while on drove, but Danny knows the truth - he had seen her shoot his father after he assaulted her in a drunken rage. Molly asks Danny where his siblings are and he says that they are still in town with the McGuinesses and that Miss Shirley said they were safer with her then with Molly. Molly rides into town and ties up the McGuinesses, telling them that her children belong with her, retrieves them and burns the court order.

Klintoff tells Louisa that he is becoming increasingly suspicious of Molly, as when they arrived at her homestead he could smell something he was familiar with from the Boer war. Louisa, a women's rights activist, adds that Danny's question about Klintoff's war wound being from Klintoff's father was a red flag. They deduce that Molly had killed her abusive husband.

Molly and her children try to run to the safety of the mountains, where Yadaka had told her about a cave the Ngarigo used as a refuge. She is stopped by one of the same drovers who had assaulted her, and thinking of her children, tells Danny to leave with the other children. John hits Molly and goes to rape her again, but she stabs him and he dies, just as Klintoff arrives on scene. Molly is arrested, refusing to reveal where her children are, simply saying "they're with family". While in lockup, she tells her story to Louisa.

Molly is sentenced to death by hanging. Louisa and several women from the suffrage movement witness her final moments. Meanwhile, Molly's children make it to the safety of the mountains.

As the story ends, we see the article Louisa had earlier mentioned she was writing (for The Dawn) (Note: The Dawn (1888–1905) was published by Louisa Lawson, mother of Henry Lawson, who wrote the short story which inspired Purcell's dramatic play and film. There is no suggestion that "Louise" is based on a real author.) entitled "The Drover's Wife - Molly Johnson's Story", in a frame on a piece of furniture in the Johnsons's. Outside, on the front porch, the adult Danny retells to his family a story that Yadaka had told him years earlier.

== Cast ==
- Leah Purcell as Molly Johnson
- Rob Collins as Yadaka
- Sam Reid as Sergeant Nate Klintoff
- Jessica De Gouw as Louisa Klintoff
- Benedict Hardie as Trooper Leslie
- Tony Cogin as Robert Parsens
- Harry Greenwood as John McPharlen
- Malachi Dower-Roberts as Danny Johnson
- Nash Zammit-Harvey as Joe Junior Johnson
- Jobe Zammit-Harvey as Henry James Johnson
- Amahlia Olsson as Delphi Johnson
- Nicholas Hope as Judge Eisenmangher
- Bruce Spence as Father McGuiness
- Maggie Dence as Shirley McGuiness
- Tammy MacIntosh as Marti Murray
- Sean Lynch as Jonathan Edwards
- Victoria Haralabidou as Elpida Sava

== Origin ==
The plot is a reworking of Henry Lawson's 1892 short story The Drover's Wife, but deviates significantly from the original story as developed in Purcell's earlier award-winning play and novel of the same name. It tells the story of a woman living with her children in an isolated location in the High Country in the colony of New South Wales near the border of the colony of Victoria.

Purcell reimagines Lawson's story through an Indigenous feminist lens, inspired by her own lived experience and the stories of her ancestors. The character of Yadaka was inspired by Purcell's great-grandfather, Tippo Charlie Chambers.

== Production ==
The story is set in the Snowy Mountains and much of the filming was done there, mostly around Adaminaby. Cinematography was by Mark Wareham.

It is Purcell's debut film as director and writer. It is the first Australian feature film to be written and directed by an Indigenous woman who also stars in the lead role. Her husband, Bain Stewart, is lead producer and executive producer on the film.

The original soundtrack is by Salliana Seven Campbell.

== Release ==
After being delayed by the COVID-19 pandemic, the film had its world premiere at South by Southwest (SXSW) on 18 March 2021. It also screened at the Warsaw International Film Festival, Cinefest Oz, the Melbourne International Film Festival, the Brisbane International Film Festival and the 68th Sydney Film Festival before being released in Australia on 5 May 2022 and in the United Kingdom on 13 May 2022.

International sales were handled by Memento Films International. In March 2021, it was announced that Samuel Goldwyn Films had acquired North American distribution rights to the film. It was released in the United States on 19 August 2022.

== Reception ==
The film opened to generally positive reviews. The acting, cinematography and Salliana Seven Campbell's score were praised by several critics.

On the review aggregator website Rotten Tomatoes, 80% of 61 critics' reviews are positive, with an average rating of 6.7/10. The website's consensus reads: "The Drover's Wife: The Legend of Molly Johnson occasionally struggles to cohere, but writer-director-star Leah Purcell offers a unique, compelling perspective on historic myths."

=== Accolades ===
At the Asia Pacific Screen Awards, The Drover's Wife won the Jury Grand Prix and Purcell was nominated for the Best Actress award.

It won the Jury Grand Prix, Best feature film, at the 2022 Rencontres internationales du cinéma des Antipodes (Antipodean Film Festival).

The film was also a nominee for the following awards:

- Cinefest Oz Film Prize
- Sydney Film Festival, Best Film
- Warsaw International Film Festival, Best Film, International Competition

=== Awards ===
Award	Category	Subject	Result
AACTA Awards (12th)	Best Film	Bain Stewart, David Jowsey, Angela Littlejohn, Greer Simpkin, Leah Purcell	Nominated
AACTA Awards (12th)	Best Direction	Leah Purcell	Nominated
AACTA Awards (12th)	Best Screenplay	Leah Purcell	Nominated
AACTA Awards (12th)	Best Actor	Rob Collins	Nominated
AACTA Awards (12th)	Best Actress	Leah Purcell	Won
AACTA Awards (12th)	Best Supporting Actor	Malachi Dower-Roberts	Nominated
AACTA Awards (12th)	Best Supporting Actress	Jessica De Gouw	Nominated
AACTA Awards (12th)	Best Cinematography	Mark Wareham	Nominated
AACTA Awards (12th)	Best Costume Design	Tess Scofield	Nominated
AACTA Awards (12th)	Best Production Design	Sam Hobbs	Nominated
AACTA Awards (12th)	Best Original Score	Salliana Seven Campbell	Nominated
AACTA Awards (12th)	Best Sound	Liam Egan, Nick Emond, Leah Katz, Robert Sullivan, Tom Heuzenroeder, Les Fiddess	Nominated
AACTA Awards (12th)	Best Hair and Makeup	Beth Halsted, Simon Joseph, Jennifer Lamphee	Nominated
APRA-AGSC Screen Music Awards (2022)	Feature Film Score of the Year	Sallianna Seven Campbell	Won
AWGIE Awards (55th)	Adapted – Feature Film	Leah Purcell	Nominated
