= Transit Lounge =

Australian book publisher

Transit Lounge Publishing
- Status: Active
- Founded: 2005
- Country of origin: Australia
- Headquarters location: Melbourne
- Key people: Barry Scott (founder and publisher), Tess Rice (founder and publisher)
- Publication types: Literary fiction, narrative and trade non-fiction
- Official website: https://transitlounge.com.au/

Transit Lounge Publishing is an independent Australian literary small press founded in Melbourne in 2005. It publishes literary fiction, narrative and trade non-fiction. The books it publishes show the diversity of Australian culture. Distribution is by NewSouth.

Transit Lounge was founded by two librarians, Barry Scott and Tess Rice. The first book they published was Sing, and Don’t Cry: A Mexican Journal by Cate Kennedy. In 2011 they published Tales from the Cancer Ward, a memoir by filmmaker Paul Cox.

It is a member of the Small Press Network, a group of small and independent Australian publishers.

== Selected award-winning books ==
- The English Class (2010) by Ouyang Yu, winner of the Multicultural Award at the 2011 New South Wales Premier's Literary Awards
- Exile: The Lives and Hopes of Werner Pelz (2012) by Roger Averill, winner of the Non-fiction book at the 2012 Western Australian Premier's Book Awards
- Black Rock White City (2015) by A. S. Patrić, winner of the 2016 Miles Franklin Award and his subsequent books Atlantic Black (2017) and The Butcherbird Stories (2018)
- From the Wreck (2017) by Jane Rawson, winner of the 2017 Aurealis Award for best science fiction novel, shortlisted for both the Barbara Jefferis Award 2018 and the Readings Prize for New Australian Fiction in 2017
- Soon (2017) by Lois Murphy, winner of the 2017 Aurealis Award for best horror novel
- The Hunter and Other Stories of Men by David Cohen, winner of the 2019 Russell Prize
- Real Differences (2019) by S. L. Lim, winner of the 2020 UTS Glenda Adams Award for New Writing, New South Wales Premier's Literary Awards
- Revenge: Murder in three parts (2020) by S. L. Lim, winner of the 2022 Barbara Jefferis Award

== Authors ==
Other authors of books published by Transit Lounge include Justine Ettler, Mark Holden, Patrick Holland, Angela Savage, Philip Salom, Aaron Smith, Nike Sulway, Vicki Viidikas, Sonya Voumard Geraldine Wooller and Cyril Wong.
