= Hope Farm (novel) =

2015 novel by Peggy Frew

- Author: Peggy Frew
- Genre: Fiction
- Publisher: Scribe
- Publication date: 23 September 2015
- Publication place: Australia
- Pages: 352
- ISBN: 9781925106572

Hope Farm is a 2015 novel by Australian author Peggy Frew. The novel follows a 13-year-old girl named Silver who moves to a rural commune, Hope Farm, after her mother Ishtar falls in love with its leader. The novel was shortlisted for the 2016 Miles Franklin Award and the 2016 Stella Prize.

== Reception ==
Hope Farm received generally positive reviews. In a review in The Guardian, Meredith Jaffe wrote that the novel effectively portrayed the complexity and pain of the relationship between Silver and her mother. Reviewing the book in The Sydney Morning Herald, Thuy On praised Frew's ability to explore a wide spectrum of human relationships, from the maternal to the platonic to the sexual. Patrick Allington wrote in a review in Australian Book Review that the middle portion of the novel was less compelling, but that the novel had a strong climax and that the relationship between Silver and Ishtar was absorbing.

== Awards ==
Awards for Hope Farm
Year	Award	Category	Result	Ref.
2016	Miles Franklin Award	—	Shortlisted	
2016	Stella Prize	—	Shortlisted	
2016	Barbara Jefferis Award	—	Won	
2016	Australian Book Industry Awards	General Fiction Book of the Year	Longlisted	
2016	Indie Book Awards	Fiction Book of the Year	Longlisted	
