= The Drover's Wife (play) =

2016 play by Leah Purcell

The Drover's Wife is a play by Leah Purcell, loosely based on the classic short story of the same name by Henry Lawson published in 1892.

== Synopsis ==
The title character, Molly Johnson, is a heavily pregnant woman living in a remote homestead in the Snowy Mountains, whose husband spends long periods away as a drover. She encounters Yadaka, an Aboriginal man on the run from colonial authorities. Over a few days, a series of events occur which change their lives forever.

== Productions ==
The play premiered at the Belvoir St Theatre in Sydney from 17 September to 16 October 2016, directed by Leticia Càceres and produced by Belvoir. The cast included Purcell in the title role, Mark Coles Smith, Tony Cogin, Benedict Hardie, and Will McDonald.

== Critical reception ==
The play and the original production were widely acclaimed.

== Awards ==
The Drover's Wife has received multiple awards, including the Nick Enright Prize for Playwriting and the overall Book of the Year at the NSW Premier's Literary Awards, and the Prize for Drama and the overall Victorian Prize for Literature at the Victorian Premier's Literary Awards. The play was named Best New Australian Work, and the Belvoir production Best Mainstage Production, at the Sydney Theatre Awards in January 2017. It received the national Helpmann Award for Best Play and Best New Australian Work in July 2017. At the AWGIE Awards in August 2017, The Drover's Wife received the Major Award across all writing for performance genres, the Stage award and the David Williamson Prize for excellence in writing for Australian theatre.

== Adaptations ==
The play was adapted into a 2021 film, also written and directed by Purcell.

The play was adapted into an opera with music by George Palmer, part of the 2026 opening program of the Queensland Performing Arts Centre's Glasshouse Theatre, with Nina Korbe in the title role and Tahu Matheson conducting.

== See also ==
- Leah Purcell#The Drover's Wife
