= Peggy Frew =

Australian novelist and musician

- Born: 1976 (age 49–50)
- Education: RMIT University
- Occupations: Author, musician
- Writing career
- Genre: Fiction
- Notable works: Hope Farm, House of Sticks
- Notable awards: Barbara Jefferis Award (2016), ARIA Award for Best Alternative Release (2001 for Wires)

Peggy Frew (born in 1976) is an Australian novelist.

== Background ==
Frew was born in 1976 and grew up in Melbourne, Australia and attended RMIT University.

== Works ==
Frew's writing often explores relationships between women within an Australian setting.

Published works by Frew include Hope Farm (2015, Scribe) and House of Sticks (2011, Scribe).

Short stories by Frew have been included in New Australian Stories 2, Women of Letters: Reviving the Lost Art of Correspondence (2011, Penguin), and Summer Shorts (2011, Scribe). She has also been published in The Big Issue, and literary magazines Kill Your Darlings and Meanjin.

Frew's novel Islands was published by Allen & Unwin in March 2019.

Frew's novel 'Wildflowers' was published by Allen & Unwin 30 August 2022.

== Music ==
Frew is a member of the Melbourne-based indie rock band, Art of Fighting. She plays bass and vocals. She formed the band in 1995 with Ollie Browne, whom she first met while at highschool. The band's album, Wires, won the 2001 ARIA Award for Best Alternative Release.

== Awards ==
In 2008, her short story "Home Visit" won The Age Short Story Award.

Her novel House of Sticks, won the 2010 Victorian Premier's Unpublished Manuscript Award.

In 2016, her novel Hope Farm won the Barbara Jefferis Award and was shortlisted for the Miles Franklin Award and the Stella Prize.

Islands was shortlisted for the 2020 Miles Franklin Award.
