= Stone Yard Devotional =

2023 novel by Charlotte Wood

- Author: Charlotte Wood
- Language: English
- Genre: Literary fiction, climate fiction
- Publisher: Allen & Unwin (AUS); Sceptre (UK); Riverhead Books (US)
- Publication date: 2 October 2023 (AUS); 3 October 2023 (UK); 11 February 2025 (US)
- Publication place: Australia; United Kingdom; United States
- Media type: Print (paperback, hardcover), ebook, kindle
- Pages: 320 pp.
- ISBN: 9781761069499 (1st ed. paperback AUS); 9781399724357 (1st ed. paperback UK); 9798217047352 (1st ed. hardcover US)

Stone Yard Devotional is a 2023 novel by Australian writer Charlotte Wood, published by Allen & Unwin in Australia and Sceptre in the UK. The novel tells the story of an unnamed narrator who becomes disillusioned with her career as an endangered species conservation specialist in Sydney amid the looming climate crisis and amid crushing despair, leaves her life and moves into a convent in rural Monaro Plains in New South Wales.

The novel was shortlisted for the 2024 Booker Prize.

== Narrative ==
The novel begins with the unnamed narrator visiting her parents' grave sites for the first time in more than 30 years. She observes nuns at the monastery performing their daily duties. The narrator is full of despair as she feels powerless in her career in wildlife conservation. With an impending climate catastrophe, and crushed by futility, the narrator leaves her career at the Threatened Species Rescue Center, leaves her husband and joins the convent somewhere in New South Wales. Initially the woman is despondent and spends her days in relative inactivity, however she eventually begins to attend meetings and assist the nuns with their daily tasks and takes over cooking duties.

Later, Sister Jenny's body is delivered to the convent for re-burial. Sister Jenny was murdered while in Thailand and her body was later unearthed after heavy rains. The body is accompanied by Helen Parry, the most famous nun from the convent. Helen Parry and the narrator grew up together and were schoolmates. The narrator feels remorse due to the bullying Helen Parry had to endure at school with the narrator herself having taken part in some of the bullying. Helen Parry (always referred to by her full name in the narrative) is now an environmental and human rights activist and is much more confident in her manners. The narrator is upset because Helen Parry brings with her news of an impending climate catastrophe, precisely the dreadful news the author wished to escape from.

A severe drought in the north of the country causes a massive mouse infestation in the town as the mice migrate south. Mice overrun the convent and are seen on the curtains, setting up a home in the piano. The nuns continue work amidst the infestation. An excavator is needed to be brought in to bury the bodies of the mice.

== Reception ==
Writing for The Guardian, novelist and screenwriter Frank Cottrell-Boyce stated that the parts of the book vividly describing the mouse infestation "would make Stephen King's hair stand on end." Cottrell-Boyce said the novel may have been set in a small, relatively isolated setting, but it elegantly incorporated themes of despair and remorse, and highlights "how though we are broken, we might still be of use." Also writing for The Guardian, Fiona Wright stated that the work had a less complex and more elemental plot, with more introspection, and a limited setting, similar to Wood's earlier works The Submerged Cathedral and The Children. Regarding the overall theme of retreat in the face of impending catastrophe, and the morality of such a position, Wright states that Wood's narration does not provide simple resolutions and her "exploration of this question is always compassionate and curious".
