= Resurrection Bay (novel) =

2015 crime novel by Australian writer Emma Viskic

- Author: Emma Viskic
- Language: English
- Genre: Crime
- Publisher: Echo Publishing
- Publication date: 1 September 2015
- Publication place: Australia
- Media type: Print
- Pages: 263 pp.
- Awards: Ned Kelly Award Best First Novel, 2016; Davitt Award Best Adult Novel, 2016
- ISBN: 9781760068769
- Preceded by: -
- Followed by: And Fire Came Down

Resurrection Bay is a crime novel by Australian writer Emma Viskic. It was originally published by Echo Publishing in Australia in 2015.

This novel is the first in the author's Caleb Zellic series.

== Synopsis ==
Caleb Zellic has been deaf since a bout of meningitis at age 5. When his best friend dies in his arms Zellic sets out to find the killer along with his business partner, ex-cop Frankie.

== Dedication ==
- Dedication: For Mum

== Publishing history ==
After its initial publication in Australia by Echo Publishing in 2015, the novel was reprinted as follows:

- Echo Publishing, Australia, 2017 and 2022
- Pushkin Press, UK, 2017
- Faber & Faber, UK, 2018

The novel was also translated into Dutch, Polish, and Czech in 2019, and French and German in 2020.

== Critical reception ==
Sue Turnbull in The Age commented: "True to form, Resurrection Bay begins with a dead body. While Melbourne-based author Emma Viskic is evidently familiar with the conventions of the crime genre, this is where her invention immediately kicks in. The dead man is cradled in the arms of his best friend, who is profoundly deaf and waiting for the paramedics to arrive. It's an arresting start, establishing both the tone (dark) and the style (telegraphic) of Viskic's first crime novel, featuring an unusual and engaging hero...Viskic has written a rattling plot-driven thriller that is not for the faint-hearted. It is, however, definitely one for those who appreciate a well-crafted sentence that never takes a predictable turn. There is much to admire here."

In The Newtown Review of Books Karen Chisholm was impressed with the book: "A deftly handled plot, strong characters and a sly, dry humour make this an outstanding debut crime novel...There’s a lot of personal background built into Resurrection Bay at this point, woven into bursts of investigative activity or revelation, but it’s very well balanced. The reader never has to wonder when the story is going to get back to the plot as there are bits and pieces of all the elements at each turn. The pace is nicely varied as well – from breakneck danger through to reaction, contemplation and consideration...The story arc through Resurrection Bay is so well balanced, and so perfectly constructed that even a slightly soppy ending not only rings true, but feels just right."

== Awards ==
- Davitt Award Best Adult Novel, 2016 winner
- Davitt Award Best Debut Novel, 2016 joint winner
- Davitt Award Readers' Choice, 2016 winner
- Ned Kelly Award Best First Novel, 2016 winner

== See also ==
- 2015 in Australian literature
