= Geraldine Wooller =

Australian novelist, short-story writer and essayist

- Born: 7 November 1941 (age 84); Perth, Western Australia
- Education: BA (Hons) in Italian and Linguistics – Dip Ed in Modern European Languages (Italian and French); Bachelor of Arts; Master of Arts (Creative Writing); PhD at University of Western Australia in Creative Writing
- Alma mater: The University of Western Australia
- Occupation: Novelist
- Writing career
- Genre: Literary Realism
- Subjects: Women’s relationships, addiction, friendship and loss
- Notable works: Snoogs and the Dandy; The Seamstress; Transgression; Trio, Degree of Madness

Geraldine Wooller (born 7 November 1941) is an Australian novelist, short-story writer and essayist. Her novels are predominantly reflective works on the nature of love, friendship, loss and endurance.

Wooller grew up in Perth, primarily raised by her Scottish mother. She commenced her tertiary education in the 1970s, the era of the second wave of feminism. Her working career has involved the administration of music education, public relations, schools liaison for prospective university students and teaching both foreign languages and English as a second language for adults.

She was encouraged in her early writing and her work commended by the late Elizabeth Jolley. She now writes from her home in Perth and spends extended periods each year in southern Italy where much of her work is set.

Her fifth title, Come out to Play, a collection of short stories was published in 2017. Her latest title, Degree of Madness deals with themes of religiosity, derangement, lesbian love, hetero-sex and family frictions and is set in England, Rome and Australia. It was published by Black Jack Books.

== Awards ==
- High commendation in the Katharine Susannah Prichard Awards 2000 for a short story
- Shortlisted for the Western Australian Premier's Award 2007 for The Seamstress
- Shortlisted for the Inaugural Barbara Jefferis Award 2008 for The Seamstress
- Longlisted for the International Dublin Impac Award 2009 for The Seamstress

== Publications ==
- 2000 – Snoogs and the Dandy
- 2007 – The Seamstress
- 2011 – Transgression
- 2015 – Trio
- 2017 – Come out to Play
- 2020 – Degree of Madness
