= Leah Purcell =

Aboriginal Australian actress, film director and writer (born 1970)

Leah Purcell AM
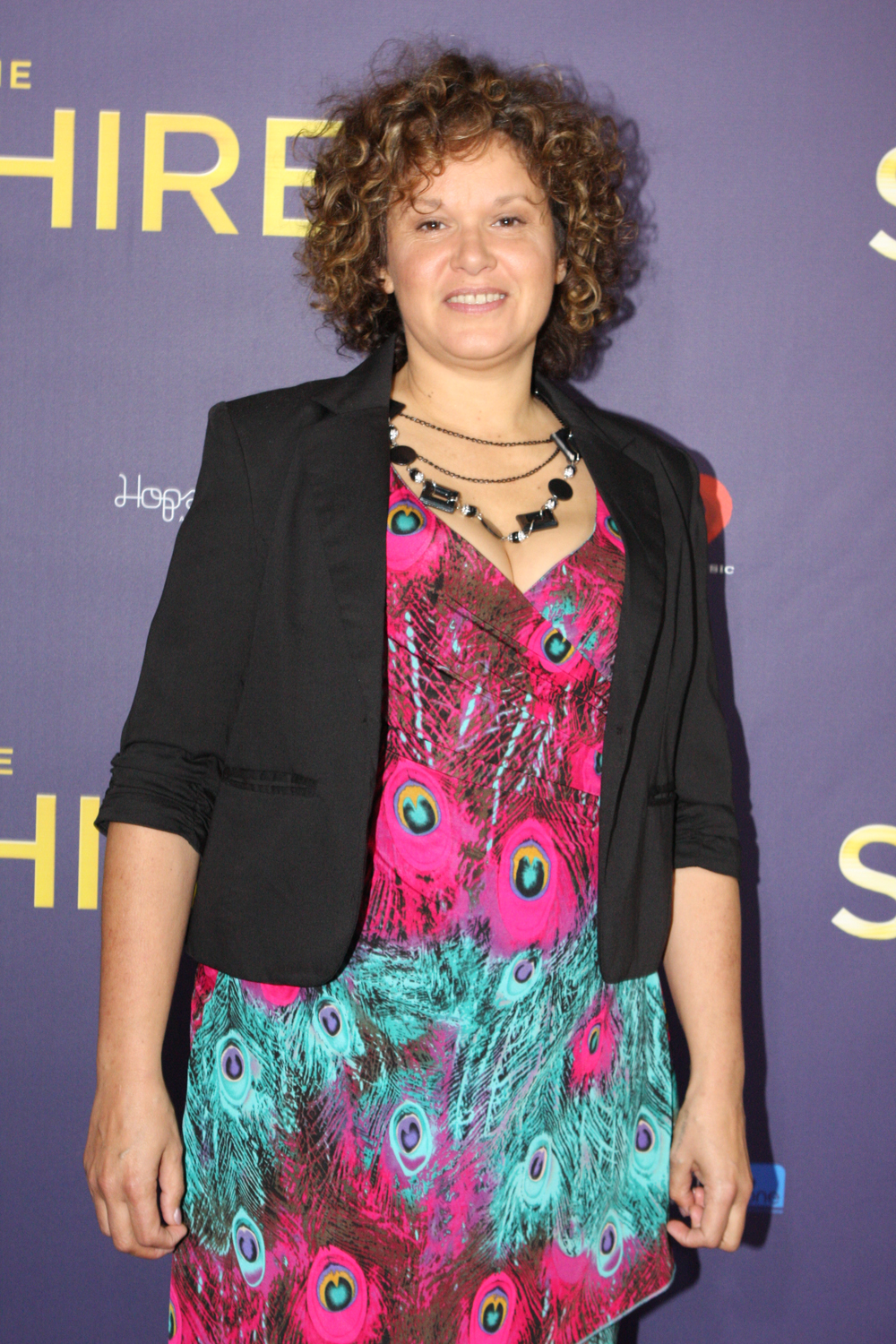
- Purcell at the premiere of The Sapphires in 2012
- Born: Leah Maree Purcell; 14 August 1970 (age 56); Murgon, Queensland, Australia
- Occupations: Actress; film director; novelist; playwright
- Years active: 1994–present
- Notable work: Redfern Now (2012–2013); Janet King (2016); Wentworth (2018–2021); The Drover's Wife:The Legend of Molly Johnson (2022)
- Partner: Bain Stewart
- Children: 1

Leah Maree Purcell AM (born 14 August 1970) is an Australian stage and film actress, playwright, film director, and novelist. She made her film debut in 1999, appearing in Paul Fenech's Somewhere in the Darkness, which led to roles in films, such as Lantana (2001), Somersault (2004), The Proposition (2005) and Jindabyne (2006).

In 2014, Purcell wrote and starred in the play The Drover's Wife, based on the original story by Henry Lawson. In 2019, she went on to write the bestselling novel, The Drover's Wife: The Legend of Molly Johnson, which was adapted for the screen when Purcell made her directorial debut in the acclaimed film of the same name in 2022, for which she had also written, produced and starred as the titular character. For her work, she has won several awards, including a Helpmann Award, two AACTA Awards, and Asia Pacific Screen Awards Jury Grand Prize.

Purcell is notable for her roles in several television drama series, including Police Rescue (1996), Fallen Angels (1997), Redfern Now (2012–2013), which earned her an AACTA Award, Janet King (2016), and perhaps her most recognisable television role being that of her AACTA and Logie Award-nominated performance as Rita Connors in the Foxtel prison drama series, Wentworth (2018–2021), the Amazon miniseries The Lost Flowers of Alice Hart (2023), and currently the Binge series, High Country (2024).

== Early life and education ==
Leah Purcell was born on 14 August 1970 in Murgon, Queensland, the youngest of seven children of Aboriginal (Goa–Gunggari–Wakka Wakka Murri) and white Australian descent. Her father was a butcher and a boxing trainer.

After a difficult adolescence looking after her sick mother, Florence, who died while Leah was in her late teens, as well as problems with alcohol and teenage motherhood, Leah left Murgon, moved to Brisbane and became involved with community theatre.

== Career ==
In 1996 she moved to Sydney to become presenter on a music video cable television station, RED Music Channel. This was followed by acting roles in ABC Television series Police Rescue and Fallen Angels.

Together with Scott Rankin she co-wrote and acted in a play called Box the Pony, which played at Sydney's Belvoir Street Theatre, the Sydney Opera House, the 1999 Edinburgh Festival and in 2000 at the Barbican Theatre in London. She then wrote and directed the documentary film Black Chicks Talking, which won a 2002 Inside Film award. She appeared as Claudia in the Australian film Lantana for which role she was nominated for Best Supporting Actress by Sydney-based Film Critics Circle of Australia; she lost to Daniela Farinacci. She appeared on stage in The Vagina Monologues. She went on to appear in three 2004 films, Somersault, The Proposition and Jindabyne, as well as playing the role of Condoleezza Rice in David Hare's play, Stuff Happens in Sydney and Melbourne.

=== Wentworth ===
In 2018, Purcell joined the cast of Foxtel drama series Wentworth as Rita Connors, a role originally portrayed by Glenda Linscott in Prisoner. It was announced that she was one of three new leading cast members to join the series for its sixth season, alongside Susie Porter and Rarriwuy Hick. She first appeared in the first episode of season six, broadcast on 19 June 2018. Following her appearances in seasons six and seven, it was announced in October 2018 that she would be reprising her role for the eighth season, which premiered in 2020.

=== The Drover's Wife ===
Purcell developed stories in different media based on the short story by Henry Lawson published in 1892, which Purcell recalls her mother reading to her. She began writing her version of the story around 2014, giving the woman a name, Molly Johnson, something that Lawson did not do. Purcell's versions centre around Molly, who is left alone on a remote homestead while heavily pregnant and having to care for her four children while her husband is away droving cattle. She meets an Aboriginal man fleeing police, called Yadaka, and a personal drama evolves. She says that "The essence of the Henry Lawson short story and his underlining themes of racism, the frontier violence and gender violence are [in her story]." However, she has added stories from her own Indigenous family as well as incorporating her own extensive historical research, which included talking to Aboriginal elders and owners of property in the Snowy Mountains, where the story is set. She has said of the development of the stories:

My DNA is within it. And I've sung up business on it. I sung up the play, I sung up the novel, I sung up the movie. And in cultural ways you have that thread of a songline which connects you to country, to family, to culture.

- She wrote and starred in the play The Drover's Wife, performed at the Belvoir in 2016. The play won multiple awards, including Book of the Year at the NSW Premier's Literary Awards, overall Victorian Prize for Literature at the Victorian Premier's Literary Awards, two Helpmann Awards, the Major AWGIE Award and several other awards.
- She penned a best-selling novel titled The Drover's Wife: The Legend of Molly Johnson, published in 2019.
- Purcell was lead actor, writer, director and co-producer of a film adaptation, also titled The Drover's Wife: The Legend of Molly Johnson, premiered at the South by Southwest Film Festival in March 2021, released on Australian screens on 5 May 2022, after a two-year delay owing to the COVID-19 pandemic. Her husband Bain Stewart is lead producer and executive producer on the film, and Rob Collins plays Yadaka.
- In late 2022 it was confirmed that Purcell was writing the follow-up to The Drover's Wife as a series set sometime in the future, with Danny as an adult leading the story.
- The play was adapted into an opera with music by George Palmer as part of the 2026 opening program of the Queensland Performing Arts Centre's Glasshouse Theatre, with Nina Korbe in the title role and Tahu Matheson conducting.
- During her panel at ACCS 2025, Purcell revealed she was writing a novel titled The Drover's Son. The book was released in 2026.

=== Other projects ===
In 2023 Purcell was announced as part of the cast Foxtel/Binge drama High Country as the lead character Andrea Whitford, Purcell revealed in the Something to Talk About podcast that she also served as the series cultural consultant. Purcell also appeared in the Amazon Prime drama The Lost Flowers of Alice Hart.

In 2025, it was announced that the play Is That You, Ruthie? written and directed by Purcell would returned for a second theatre run at QPAC. In Mid October 2025, Purcell was announced for upcoming feature film Zac Power based on the successful novels.

== Recognition, awards and honours ==
Purcell was recipient of the Balnaves Fellowship in 2014, which allowed her to develop her play, The Drover's Wife, to be performed at the Belvoir in 2016.

In the 2021 Queen's Birthday Honours, Purcell was appointed a Member of the Order of Australia for "significant service to the performing arts, to First Nations youth and culture, and to women".

At the 14th Asia Pacific Screen Awards held in November 2021, she was awarded the Jury Grand Prize for her film The Drover's Wife, "not just for her singular vision in writing, directing, producing and starring in the film but for the journey to bring this remarkable story, viewed through the lens of a First Nations woman to the screen in its entirety".

Purcell has appeared twice on ABC Television's Australian Story, once in 2002 and once in June 2022.

In June 2022, Purcell was honoured with a star on Winton's Walk of Fame, which was unveiled during The Vision Splendid Outback Film Festival.

In June 2024, Purcell was nominated for a TV Week Logie for Best Supporting Actress for The Lost Flowers of Alice Hart.

== Personal life ==
Purcell's partner is Bain Stewart, who is also her business partner in Oombarra Productions. She has a daughter and two grandchildren. She believes that Stewart has been "a gift from the ancestors", as he has been such an important support to her through difficult times.

On 4 September 2026, Purcell was awarded an Honorary Doctorate from Queensland's Queensland University of Technology for services to community.

== Filmography ==
=== Film ===
Year	Title	Role	Ref
1999	Somewhere in the Darkness	Lulu	
2001	Lantana	Claudia	
2002	Beginnings	Police Officer	
2003	Lennie Cahill Shoots Through	Doctor	
2004	Somersault	Diane	
2005	The Proposition	Queenie	
2006	Jindabyne	Carmel	
2014	My Mistress	Audrey	
2015	Last Cab to Darwin (film)	Sonya	
2022	The Drover's Wife: The Legend of Molly Johnson	Molly Johnson	
2023	Shayda	Joyce	
TBA	Zac Power	Agent Ironclad	feature film: (voice)

=== Television ===
Year	Title	Role	Notes	Ref
1996	G.P.	Lauren	Season 8 (guest, 1 episode)	
1996	Police Rescue	Constable Tracey Davis	Season 5 (main, 9 episodes)	
1997	Fallen Angels	Sharon Walker	Season 1 (main, 20 episodes)	
1998	Water Rats	Sarah Lane	Season 3 (guest, 1 episode)	
2000–01	Beastmaster	The Black Apparation	Seasons 1–3 (recurring, 5 episodes)	
2001	The Lost World	Witch Doctor	Season 2 (guest, 1 episode)	
2002	Bad Cop, Bad Cop	Lorraine Simpson	Season 1 (guest, 1 episode)	
2007	Love My Way	Caroline Syron	Season 3 (recurring, 3 episodes)	
2007	The Starter Wife	Hannah Sprints	Miniseries (recurring, 2 episodes)	
2008	McLeod's Daughters	Terri Barker	Season 8 (guest, 1 episode)	
2009	My Place	Ellen	Season 1 (guest, 1 episode)	
2012–13	Redfern Now	Grace	Seasons 1–2 (main, 2 episodes)	
2015	House of Hancock	Hilda Kickett	Miniseries (guest, 1 episode)	
2015	Mary: The Making of a Princess	Toni Klan	TV movie	
2015–16	Love Child	Daisy	Seasons 2–3 (recurring, 3 episodes)	
2016	Janet King	Heather O'Connor	Season 2 (main, 8 episodes)	
2016–18	Black Comedy	Guest performer	Seasons 2–3 (recurring, 3 episodes)	
2018–21	Wentworth	Rita Connors	Season 6–8 (main; 37 episodes)	
2021	All My Friends Are Racist	Justice Janelle Ray AO	1 episode	
2022	Childish Deano	Mrs Narkle	1 episode (voice)	
2022	Krystal Klairvoyant	Deborah	3 episodes (Tik Tok series)	
2023	The Lost Flowers of Alice Hart	Twig	Miniseries	
2024–present	High Country	Andrea Whitford	8 episodes	
2025	Ghosts: Australia	Mel	TV series	

=== Other appearances ===
Year	Title	Role	Notes	Ref
2026	70 Years of Australian TV	Self	Documentary	
2025	The Great Entertainer	Self	Documentary	
2025–present	Our Medicine	Narrator	TV series	
2022	Australian Story	Self	TV special	
2022	ABC 90	Self	TV special	
2021	Living Black	Self	TV special	
2021	Wentworth: Unlocked	Self	TV Special	
2020	Wentworth: Behind the Bars 2			
2019	Wentworth: Behind the Bars	Self	TV Special	
2019	Anh's Brush with Fame	Self	1 episode	

=== Production credits ===
Year	Title	Notes	Ref
2004	Black Chicks Talking	Director; documentary	
2009	Aunty Maggie and the Womba Wakgun	Director; short film	
2009	My Place	Writer; episode: "2008 Laura"	
2012	She Say	Director / writer; video short	
2012	Redfern Now	Director; episode: "Sweet Spot"	
2016	The Secret Daughter	Director; episode: "Flame Trees"	
2019	My Life Is Murder	Director; episodes: "The Boyfriend Experience"; "Lividity in Lycra"	
2021	All My Friends Are Racist	Executive producer	
2022	The Drover's Wife: The Legend of Molly Johnson	Director, writer and producer	
2022	The Twelve	Writer (2 episodes)	
2023, 2025	Is That You Ruthie?	Writer and director: Theatre play QPAC	
2024	High Country	Executive producer / culture consultant	
TBA	Koa Kid		
TBA	Netball		

== Awards and nominations ==
Year	Ceremony	Category	Nominated work	Result	Ref.
1994	Matilda Awards	Best New Talent (Highly Commended)	Low	Won	
1995	Deadly Awards	Best New Talent	herself	Won	
1997	Australian Film Institute	Best Lead Actress in a Television Drama	Fallen Angels (episode 14)	Nominated	
1999	Deadly Awards	Female Artist of the Year	herself	Won	
1999	NSW Premier's Literary Awards	Nick Enright Prize for Playwriting	Box the Pony (shared with Scott Rankin)	Won	
2000	Queensland Premier's Literary Awards	Drama Script (Stage) Award	Box the Pony (shared with Scott Rankin)	Won	
2001	Deadly Awards	Indigenous Female Music Artist of the Year	herself	Won	
2001	Helpmann Awards	Best Female Actor in a Play	Box the Pony	Nominated	
2001	IF Awards	Best Actress	Lantana	Won	
2002	Brisbane International Film Festival	Audience Award	Black Chicks Talking	Won	
2002	Film Critics Circle of Australia	Best Supporting Actor – Female	Lantana	Nominated	
2002	IF Awards	Best Documentary	Black Chicks Talking	Won	
2002	Tribeca Festival	Best Documentary Feature	Black Chicks Talking	Nominated	
2003	Logie Awards	Most Outstanding Documentary Series	Black Chicks Talking	Nominated	
2004	Green Room Awards	Best Actress in a Play	Beasty Girl: The Secret Life of Errol Flynn	Won	
2006	Bob Maza Fellowship	—N/a	herself	Won	
2006	Byron Kennedy Award (Committee Member)	—N/a	herself	Nominated	
2006	Deadly Awards	Actor of the Year	Stuff Happens	Won	
2006	Deadly Awards	Actor of the Year	Jindabyne	Nominated	
2006	Helpmann Awards	Best Female Actor in a Play	Stuff Happens	Nominated	
2006	Mo Awards	Best Actress in a Play	Stuff Happens	Nominated	
2007	Deadly Awards	Actor of the Year	herself	Won	
2007	Glugs Theatrical Awards	Norman Kessell Memorial Award for Outstanding Performance – Actress	The Story of Miracles at Cookie’s Table	Nominated	
2007	Sydney Theatre Awards	Best Actress in a Play	The Story of Miracles at Cookie’s Table	Nominated	
2008	Helpmann Awards	Best Female Actor in a Play	The Story of the Miracles at Cookie's Table	Won	
2009	Deadly Awards	Actor of the Year	herself	Won	
2010	Matilda Awards	Best Female Actor in a Play	The Story of Miracles at Cookie’s Table	Won	
2010	Matilda Awards	Matilda Trophy for Directing & Acting contribution to Indigenous Community with Arts	herself	Won	
2013	AACTA Awards	Best Lead Actress in a Television Drama	Redfern Now (episode 1)	Won	
2013	Logie Awards	Most Outstanding Actress	Redfern Now (season 1)	Nominated	
2014	Balnaves Foundation Indigenous Playwright's Awards	—N/a	herself	Won	
2016	AACTA Awards	Best Performance in a Television Comedy	Black Comedy (season 2)	Nominated	
2016	AWGIE Awards	Children's Television – C Classification	Ready for This: The Birthday Party	Won	
2016	Sydney Theatre Awards	Best New Australian Work	The Drover's Wife (play)	Won	
2017	AACTA Awards	Best Direction in Television	Cleverman (episode 4)	Nominated	
2017	Awgie Awards	Best Play	The Drover's Wife (play)	Won	
2017	Awgie Awards	David Williamson Award for Excellence in Theatre	The Drover's Wife (play)	Won	
2017	Helpmann Awards	Best Female Actor in a Play	The Drover's Wife (play)	Nominated	
2017	Helpmann Awards	Best New Australian Work	The Drover's Wife (play)	Won	
2017	NSW Premier's Literary Awards	Nick Enright Prize for Playwriting	The Drover's Wife (play)	Won	
2017	NSW Premier's Literary Awards	Book of the Year	The Drover's Wife (book)	Won	
2017	NSW Premier's Literary Awards	Indigenous Writers Prize	The Drover's Wife (play)	Won	
2017	Victorian Premier's Literary Awards	Prize for Drama	The Drover's Wife (play)	Won	
2017	Victorian Premier's Literary Awards	Prize for Literature	The Drover's Wife (book)	Won	
2017	UNESCO City of Film Award	—N/a	herself	Won	
2018	AACTA Awards	Best Lead Actress in a Television Drama	Wentworth (season 6)	Nominated	
2018	National Dreamtime Awards	Female Actor of the Year	herself	Won	
2019	Logie Awards	Most Outstanding Actress	Wentworth (season 6)	Nominated	
2020	Davitt Award	Best Debut Crime Book	The Drover's Wife (book)	Nominated	
2021	Asia Pacific Screen Awards	Best Performance by an Actress	The Drover's Wife (film)	Nominated	
2021	Asia Pacific Screen Awards	APSA Jury Grand Prize	The Drover's Wife (film)	Won	
2021	Australian Screen Industry Network Awards	Best Writer/Screenplay	The Drover's Wife (film)	Won	
2021	Warsaw Film Festival	Best Film	The Drover's Wife (film)	Nominated	
2022	AACTA Awards	AACTA Award for Best Film	The Drover's Wife (film)	Nominated	
2022	AACTA Awards	Best Film	The Drover's Wife (film)	Nominated	
2022	AACTA Awards	Best Adapted Screenplay	The Drover's Wife (film)	Nominated	
2022	AACTA Awards	Best Actress in a Leading Role	The Drover's Wife (film)	Won	
2022	Australian Directors' Guild	Best Direction in a Feature Film (Budget $1M or over)	The Drover's Wife (film)	Nominated	
2022	Australian Directors' Guild	Best Direction in a Debut Feature Film	The Drover's Wife (film)	Won	
2022	Gold Coast Film Festival (Chauvel Award)	—N/a	The Drover's Wife (film)	Won	
2022	NSW Premier's Literary Award	Betty Roland Prize for Scriptwriting	The Drover's Wife (film)	Nominated	
2023	Film Critics Circle if Australia	Best Film	The Drover's Wife (film)	Nominated	
2023	Film Critics Circle if Australia	Best Director	The Drover's Wife (film)	Nominated	
2023	Film Critics Circle if Australia	Best Actress	The Drover's Wife (film)	Won	
2023	Film Critics Circle if Australia	Best Screenplay	The Drover's Wife (film)	Nominated	
2024	AACTA Awards	Best Guest or Supporting Actress in a Television Drama	The Lost Flowers of Alice Hart	Nominated	
2024	TV Week Logies	TV Week Silver Logie – Best Supporting Actress	The Lost Flowers of Alice Hart	Nominated	
2025	AACTA Awards	Best Lead Actress in a Television Drama	High Country	Pending	
