= Charlotte Wood =

Australian novelist (born 1965)

Charlotte Wood AM
- Born: Charlotte Ann Wood; 1965 (age 60–61); Cooma, New South Wales, Australia
- Occupation: Novelist
- Writing career
- Language: English
- Genre: Fiction
- Notable work: The Natural Way of Things

Charlotte Wood AM (born 1965) is an Australian novelist. The Australian newspaper described Wood as "one of our [Australia's] most original and provocative writers".

== Early life and education ==
Wood was born in Cooma, New South Wales. She has a PhD from the University of New South Wales; previous degrees are a Master of Creative Arts from UTS and a BA from Charles Sturt University.

== Career ==
She is the author of seven novels – Pieces of a Girl (1999), The Submerged Cathedral (2004), The Children (2007), Animal People (2011), The Natural Way of Things (2015), The Weekend (2019), and Stone Yard Devotional (2023). She has also written a book about creativity, The Luminous Solution (2021), a collection of interviews with Australian writers, The Writer's Room (2016), and a collection of personal reflections on cooking, Love & Hunger (2012). She was also editor of an anthology of writing about siblings, Brothers & Sisters (2009).

Her books have been critically well received and frequently mentioned in prize lists. In 2016 The Natural Way of Things won the Stella Prize, the Indie Book Awards Novel of the Year and Book of the Year, and was shortlisted for various other prizes including the Miles Franklin and Barbara Jefferis. Animal People was shortlisted for the NSW Premier's Literary Awards in 2013 and longlisted for the 2012 Miles Franklin Award. She has a background in journalism and has also taught writing at a variety of levels.

In 2014, she was appointed Chair of Arts Practice, Literature, at the Australia Council for the Arts, a three-year appointment.

She currently lives in Sydney.

In May 2016, it was announced that Wood won the Writer in Residence Fellowship at the University of Sydney's Charles Perkins Centre. As an Honorary Associate, Wood has been working with health specialists to offer literary views on the complex topic of ageing.

In 2024, her novel Stone Yard Devotional was shortlisted for the Booker Prize.

== Awards and honours ==
- 1999 – Jim Hamilton Prize, winner, Pieces of a Girl
- 2000 – Dobbie Award, shortlisted, Pieces of a Girl
- 2005 – Miles Franklin Award, shortlisted, The Submerged Cathedral
- 2005 – Commonwealth Writers' Prize, Asia Pacific region, shortlisted, The Submerged Cathedral
- 2007 – Australian Book Industry Awards, literary fiction, shortlisted, The Children
- 2012 – Miles Franklin Award, longlisted, Animal People
- 2012 – Kibble Prize, shortlisted, Animal People
- 2013 – Christina Stead Prize for Fiction, shortlisted, Animal People
- 2013 – People's Choice Award, NSW Premier's Literary Awards, winner, Animal People
- 2016 – Writer in Residence Fellowship at the University of Sydney's Charles Perkins Centre
- 2016 – Stella Prize, winner, The Natural Way of Things
- 2016 – Voss Literary Prize, shortlisted, The Natural Way of Things
- 2019 – Member of the Order of Australia, 2019 Queen's Birthday Honours in recognition of her "significant service to literature"
- 2019 – The Australian Financial Review, 100 Women of Influence award for Arts, Culture and Sport
- 2020 – Stella Prize, shortlisted, The Weekend
- 2020 – Miles Franklin Award, longlisted, The Weekend
- 2020 – ALS Gold Medal, shortlisted, The Weekend
- 2021 – Christina Stead Prize for Fiction, shortlisted for The Weekend
- 2024 – Victorian Premier's Prize for Fiction, shortlisted for Stone Yard Devotional
- 2024 – Miles Franklin Award, longlisted, Stone Yard Devotional
- 2024 – Booker Prize, shortlisted, Stone Yard Devotional
- 2024 – Prime Minister's Literary Award for Fiction, shortlisted for Stone Yard Devotional
- 2024 – Barbara Jefferis Award, shortlisted for Stone Yard Devotional
- 2025 – International Dublin Literary Award, longlisted for Stone Yard Devotional

== Bibliography ==
=== Fiction ===
- Pieces of a Girl (1999)
- The Submerged Cathedral (2004)
- The Children (2007)
- Animal People (2011)
- The Natural Way of Things (2015)
- The Weekend (2019)
- Stone Yard Devotional (2023)

=== Non-fiction ===
- Love and Hunger (2012)
- The Writer's Room: Conversations About Writing (2016)
- The Luminous Solution (2021)

=== As Editor ===
- Brothers & Sisters (2009) – stories by 12 Australian writers including Nam Le, Christos Tsiolkas, Tegan Bennett Daylight, Cate Kennedy and others.

== Interviews ==
- First Tuesday Book Club
- ABC Radio National – Life Matters
- ABC Radio National – The Book Show
- Readings Booksellers Website
- BBC World Service - World Book Club
