= The Natural Way of Things =

Novel by Charlotte Wood

- First edition
- Author: Charlotte Wood
- Language: English
- Genre: novel
- Publisher: Allen and Unwin
- Publication date: 2015
- Publication place: Australia
- Media type: Print (paperback)
- Pages: 320pp
- ISBN: 9781760111236
- Preceded by: Love and Hunger

The Natural Way of Things (2015) is a novel by Australian writer Charlotte Wood. It won the Stella Prize, for writing by Australian women, in 2016.

== Plot summary ==
Ten young women are held prisoner somewhere in the Australian bush by two male guards and a woman who purports to be a nurse. The women come to discover that they are all connected in that they are all the victims of sexual scandals. They have been kidnapped and kept out of society's view in order for the scandal to die down. But they are also humiliated, and physically and emotionally punished.

== Critical reception ==
Rosemary Sorenson in The Sydney Review of Books, is in no doubt about the novel's worth: "Charlotte Wood’s fifth novel The Natural Way of Things is a virtuoso performance, plotted deftly through a minefield of potential traps, weighted with allegory yet swift and sure in its narrative advance. As an idea for a novel, it’s rich, and to achieve that idea the writer has been courageous. Her control of this story is masterful."

Kerryn Goldsworthy in The Sydney Morning Herald agrees: "This is an extraordinary novel: inspired, powerful, at once coherent and dreamlike. While it's rich in symbols and in implications, much of it is brutally realist in mode, with its flights of imagination anchored in rational explanations: the result of drugs or fever dreams...The Natural Way of Things recalls all the reading you've ever done on the subjects of capture, isolation, incarceration, totalitarianism, misogyny, and the abuse of power. It's thought-provoking in all directions."

== Awards ==
Year	Award	Category	Result	Ref
2016	Australian Book Industry Awards	Australian Literary Fiction Book of the Year	Longlisted	
2016	Indie Book Awards	Fiction	Won	
2016	Miles Franklin Literary Award	—	Shortlisted	
2016	Nita Kibble Literary Awards	Nita B Kibble Literary Award	Longlisted	
2016	Stella Prize	—	Won	
2016	Victorian Premier's Literary Awards	Vance Palmer Prize for Fiction	Shortlisted	
2016	Voss Literary Prize	—	Shortlisted	

== See also ==
- 2015 in Australian literature
