= Abandon Every Hope =

2023 book by Hayley Singer

- Author: Hayley Singer
- Genre: Narrative non-fiction
- Publisher: Upswell Publishing
- Publication date: January 2023
- Publication place: Australia
- Pages: 180
- ISBN: 1743822871

Abandon Every Hope: Essays for the Dead is a 2023 work of narrative non-fiction by Hayley Singer. The book was published by Upswell Publishing and was shortlisted for the 2024 Stella Prize. The book is structured as a collection of essays criticising animal agriculture and human violence against farmed animals.

== Reception ==
The book received generally positive reviews. Fiona Wright wrote in The Saturday Paper that "Singer’s writing is rigorous and often lyrical and there’s an insistence and urgency that always propel this work and make it deeply compelling". Writing in The Conversation, Julieanne Lamond wrote that the essays "take the reader directly into the slaughterhouse, and they are difficult to forget". In ABC News, Declan Fry described the book as "a brave, provocative debut" and wrote that the essays were "at once philosophical, critical, and prose-poetic". Ben Brooker praised the book in a review for Australian Book Review, writing that Singer's writing had the "fervour of a polemicist and the lyricism of a poet". Anwen Crawford gave a more mixed review in the Sydney Review of Books, writing that Singer's book was "both ambitious and uncertain", and that it was easy to get muddled in the "queasy intractability" of her subject matter.

== Awards ==
Awards for Abandon Every Hope
Year	Award	Category	Result	Ref.
2024	Stella Prize	—	Shortlisted	
