= The Bridge (Gandolfo novel) =

2018 novel by Enza Gandolfo

- Author: Enza Gandolfo
- Genre: Fiction
- Publisher: Scribe
- Publication date: 14 May 2018
- Publication place: Australia
- Pages: 384
- ISBN: 9781925713015

The Bridge is a 2018 novel by Enza Gandolfo. The novel is about the 1970 West Gate Bridge collapse, which killed 35 construction workers and remains Australia's deadliest workplace accident. The novel has two protagonists: Italian migrant Antonello, a 22-year-old rigger on the West Gate Bridge in 1970 and a survivor of the bridge collapse, and 19-year-old student Jo, who is blamed for a car accident in 2009. The novel was shortlisted for the 2019 Stella Prize.

== Reception ==
The novel received generally positive reviews. In a review in Australian Book Review, Carol Middleton wrote that Gandolfo's prose lacked a degree of subtlety and elegance, but that she was a skilled storyteller and that her characters were highly compelling. Julienne van Loon described the book as "an ambitious, multi-generational story from a skilled writer" in a review in TEXT, praising both Gandolfo's depiction of Melbourne's working-class multicultural suburbs and the depth of her characters. The Stella Prize judging panel praised the evocative nature of Gandolfo's writing and wrote that the novel was "a story with many layers that is deeply intellectual and unashamedly working-class, showing Footscray and Melbourne's west in ways we’ve not seen before".

== Awards ==
Awards for The Bridge
Year	Award	Category	Result	Ref.
2019	Stella Prize	—	Shortlisted	
