= Courtney Collins =

Australian author

- Education: University of Newcastle; University of Melbourne; Charles Darwin University
- Occupation: Writer
- Writing career
- Notable works: The Burial (2012 novel); Life Could Be a Dream (2026 film)

Courtney Collins is an Australian novelist and screenwriter. She has written two novels—The Burial (2012) and Bird (2024). Her first novel, The Burial, was shortlisted for the Stella Prize and the Dobbie Literary Award. She wrote the screenplay for the 2026 film Life Could Be a Dream.

== Early life and education ==
Courtney Collins grew up in the Hunter Valley in New South Wales, Australia.

In 1999, she graduated with a BA First Class Hons in English literature from the University of Newcastle. In 2005 she earned a Masters of Creative Writing from the University of Melbourne.

From 2021 until 2025 she undertook a PhD at Charles Darwin University in Darwin, Northern Territory.

== Career ==
Collins first worked as a journalist.

In June 2026 she was appointed a lecturer in creative writing at Charles Darwin University.

=== Novels ===
Collins' first novel, The Burial, was published in Australia by Allen & Unwin in 2012 and in the United States under the title The Untold by Putnam in 2014. The novel was inspired by the life of the female bushranger Jessie Hickman. It received positive reviews and was shortlisted for the Stella Prize, the Glenda Adams Award for New Writing, and the Dobbie Literary Award. In Australian Book Review, Gillian Dooley wrote that the novel was "finely written, with a lovely ear for the cadences of language, but it also has an urgent narrative drive, along with a strong awareness of place, compelling characters, and a whiff of magic realism to enliven the mixture." In The Newtown Review of Books, Annette Hughes wrote that the book had a "brilliant liberating conclusion" and that its language and structure were polished and well-executed. A review in Kirkus Reviews wrote that Collins "richly evokes a heartbreaking emotional terrain", while a review in Publishers Weekly praised her "poetic language and salty dialogue". In The Sydney Morning Herald, Felicity Plunkett wrote that the book had an "oddness and lyricism" and that its unconventional narration gave it poignancy.

Collins' second novel, Bird, was published by Hachette Australia in 2024. The novel follows two girls named Bird; one is sold into an arranged marriage in a Himalayan village, while the other, a reincarnation of the former, wakes up in a hospital in Darwin suffering from amnesia. In a review in The Saturday Paper, Maria Takolander praised the novel's "propulsive but understated storytelling" and Collins' strong characterisation. In Australian Book Review, Laura Elizabeth Woollett criticised Collins' unrealistic depictions of Himalayan culture, writing that the book gave the impression of "Ancient Himalayan cosplay". In The Age, Jessie Tu praised the novel's feminist message while writing that it was sometimes over-descriptive and suffered from inertia.

=== Films ===
Collins has co-written the script for a feature film based on her novel The Burial.

Collins wrote the screenplay for the 2026 feature fiction film centred around a woman escaping from domestic violence, titled Life Could Be a Dream, which was directed by Jasmin Tarasin.

== Recognition and accolades ==
The Burial was shortlisted for the The Australian/Vogel Literary Award, the Nita Kibble Literary Award, NSW Premier's Literary Award, and the Stella Prize.

Collins has also been recognised for her work in other ways:

- 2015: Sidney Myer Fellowship
- 2019: Asialink Fellowship
- 2019: Listed on the Screen Producers Association's "Ones to Watch" program
- 2025: Lamplight Residency at the Irish Writers Centre and Varuna

== Selected works ==
- The Burial (Allen & Unwin, 2012) ISBN 978-1-74331-187-5
- Bird (Hachette Australia, 2024), ISBN 978-0-7336-5241-7
