= Enza Gandolfo =

Australian academic and author

- Occupation: Author
- Notable works: The Bridge

Enza Gandolfo is an Australian author and academic. She has written two novels: The Bridge and Swimming. Her work has been shortlisted for the Barbara Jefferis Award and the Stella Prize.

== Education and career ==
Enza Gandolfo grew up in the western suburbs of Melbourne in a working-class Sicilian family. She graduated from Melbourne University with a Bachelor of Arts, and holds a Masters of Arts and a PhD in creative writing from Victoria University. She is an Associate Professor of Creative Writing at Victoria University.

== Writing ==
Gandolfo's first novel, Swimming, was released in 2009. The novel is set in Melbourne's western suburbs and follows an ageing writer named Kate Wilks. Wilks has an unexpected encounter with her former husband, which causes her to reflect on her life—particularly on her lack of children. A review in Australian Book Review labelled the novel "a beautiful tribute to womanhood", and praised the interweaving of stories from Wilks' older and younger selves. The novel was shortlisted for the Barbara Jefferis Award.

Gandolfo's second novel, The Bridge, was published in 2018. It describes the West Gate Bridge collapse, a 1970 industrial accident that killed 35 workers. Gandolfo, who was a high school student at the time, has explained that the bridge collapse affected her community deeply, and that she was motivated to write the novel by her sense of injustice at the accident. The novel juxtaposes the accident with a modern-day car crash that upends the lives of two high school students. In a review in Australian Book Review, Carol Middleton wrote that despite some imperfections in her prose, Gandolfo was a skilled storyteller and that her characters were highly compelling. Julienne van Loon praised Gandolfo's depiction of Melbourne's working-class multicultural suburbs and the depth of her characters in a review in the journal TEXT. The novel was shortlisted for the Stella Prize.

== Works ==
- Gandolfo, Enza (2009). Swimming. Vanark Press. ISBN 9780980350029.
- Gandolfo, Enza (2018). The Bridge. Scribe Publications. ISBN 9781925548938.
