= Like a House on Fire =

Like a House on Fire may refer to:

- Like a House on Fire (album), a 2020 album by Asking Alexandria
- Like a House on Fire (film), a 2021 Canadian drama film
- Like a House on Fire (short story collection), a 2012 collection by Cate Kennedy
