= Body Friend =

2023 novel by Katherine Brabon

- Author: Katherine Brabon
- Genre: Fiction
- Publisher: Ultimo Press
- Publication date: September 2023
- Publication place: Australia
- Pages: 272
- ISBN: 9781761151781

Body Friend is a 2023 novel by Katherine Brabon. The novel is about a friendship between two women experiencing chronic illness. It was shortlisted for the 2024 Stella Prize and the 2024 University of Queensland Fiction Book Award at the Queensland Literary Awards.

== Plot summary ==
A 28-year-old woman who experiences chronic illness is released from hospital after a major operation. She begins swimming in a hydrotherapy pool as part of her recovery, where she meets Frida (named for Frida Kahlo), another women experiencing chronic illness. Later, she meets another woman suffering from chronic illness named Sylvia (named for Sylvia Plath) in a park. She forms a friendship with both women, who each encourage a different kind of relationship with her body and illness. Frida encourages the narrator to resist her pain and to push through it by continuing to swim, while Sylvia encourages her to rest through her pain.

== Publication history ==
Brabon was inspired to write the novel by her own experience of rheumatoid arthritis, saying in an interview in the Sydney Morning Herald that she "wanted to capture the experience of a body in pain and the mental processes the person goes through in that state and how they can be very changeable".

The novel was first published in Australia by Ultimo Press in September 2023 (ISBN 9781761151781). It was published in the United States by Bloomsbury Publishing in July 2024 (ISBN 9781639734511).

== Reception ==
The novel received generally positive reviews. In a review in The Saturday Paper, Fiona Wright wrote that Body Friend was a "deeply interior, thoughtful book", and praised its language for being "startling for its poetic tendencies – it is rhythmic and observant, and liltingly musical – as well as its clarity and sharp concision". Sarah L'Estrange wrote for ABC News that the book had "an intimacy to its measured observations that will propel you to its concluding remarks". Writing in The Conversation, Julianne Lamond described it as a "hypnotic, uncomfortable novel about chronic pain and female friendship" and commented that its "structure is cyclical and the pacing is slow, but it is gripping nonetheless".

Reviewers particularly praised Brabon's poetic use of language. In a review in the Sydney Morning Herald, Vanessa Francesca wrote that the book made her feel "an intense awareness of the presence and beauty of language", while Alison Huber praised Brabon's "careful and artful prose" in a review for Readings Monthly. A review in Meanjin described Brabon's voice as "contemplative and lyrical" and wrote that the novel was a "sensitive narrative about grappling with a sick body and the difficulty of balancing movement and rest".

== Awards ==
Awards for Body Friend
| Year | Award | Category | Result | Ref. |
|---|---|---|---|---|
| 2024 | Stella Prize | — | Shortlisted | |
| 2024 | Queensland Literary Awards | University of Queensland Fiction Book Award | Shortlisted | |
| 2024 | ALS Gold Medal | — | Shortlisted | |
