= Translations (novel) =

2024 novel by Jumaana Abdu

- Author: Jumaana Abdu
- Genre: Fiction
- Publisher: Penguin Random House
- Publication date: 27 August 2024
- Publication place: Australia
- Pages: 336
- ISBN: 9781761343872

Translations is a 2024 novel by Jumaana Abdu. The book, which was Abdu's debut novel, follows a woman named Aliyah who moves with her daughter Sakina to a rural property in New South Wales. There, she develops a connection with her Palestinian farmhand, Shep, and her childhood friend Hana.

== Reception ==
The book received positive reviews in The Age, Meanjin, Kill Your Darlings, and Readings Monthly. The book was shortlisted for the 2025 Stella Prize and was described by the judging panel as "a joy to read".

== Awards ==
Awards for Translations
Year	Award	Category	Result	Ref.
2025	Stella Prize	—	Shortlisted	
2025	Voss Literary Prize	—	Longlisted	
2026	Barbara Jefferis Award	—	Shortlisted	
