= Cate Kennedy =

Australian author based in Victoria (born 1963)

- Born: 1963 (age 62–63); Louth, Lincolnshire
- Occupations: Writer, poet and teacher of creative writing, editor
- Writing career
- Language: English
- Years active: 1978-
- Notable work: The Taste of River Water
- Notable awards: 2011 Victorian Premier's Literary Award

Cate Kennedy (born 1963) is an Australian author based in Victoria.

== Life and career ==
Kennedy was born in 1963 in England at Louth, Lincolnshire. She was educated at the University of Canberra and the Australian National University. She has taught at several colleges, including The University of Melbourne.

Kennedy is the author of the highly acclaimed novel The World Beneath, which won the People's Choice Award in the NSW Premier's Literary Awards in 2010. It was also shortlisted for The Age fiction prize 2010 and the ASA Barbara Jefferis Award 2010, among others. She is a short-story writer whose work has twice won The Age Short Story Competition and has appeared in a range of publications, including The New Yorker. Her collection, Dark Roots, was shortlisted for the Steele Rudd Award in the Queensland Premier's Literary Awards and for the Australian Literature Society Gold Medal. Kennedy is also the author of the travel memoir Sing, and Don’t Cry, and the poetry collections Joyflight and Signs of Other Fires. Her book The Taste of River Water: New and Selected Poems by Cate Kennedy, which was published in May 2011, won the Victorian Premier's Literary Awards CJ Dennis Prize for Poetry.

== Awards ==
- 2013: Steele Rudd Award. Winner for Like a House on Fire
- 2013: The Stella Prize Shortlisted for Like a House on Fire
- 2011: Victorian Premier's Literary Award C.J. Dennis Prize for Poetry Winner for The Taste of River Water
- 2004: IP Picks. Winner for Joyflight
- 2004: Ginninderra Press Short Story Competition. Winner
- 2002: The Vincent Buckley Poetry Prize for Signs of Other Fires
- 2001 Victorian Premier's Literary Award. Highly Commended for Signs of Other Fires
- 2000 & 2001: The Age Short Story Award
- 1997: ANUTECH Literary Prize. Short Story Winner for White Flight
- 1996 & 1997: HQ/HarperCollins Short Story Competition. Shortlisted
- 1994 & 1995: Scarlett Stiletto. Winner

Other awards: The Herald/Sun Short Story Award

The 2007 Sisters in Crime Scarlett Stiletto Awards include a category named for Kennedy: "The Cate Kennedy Award for Best New Talent ($350)"

== Bibliography ==
=== Novels ===
- The World Beneath (Scribe, 2009) ISBN 978-1-921372-96-4

=== Short fiction ===
Collections

- Dark Roots, (Scribe, 2006) ISBN 1-920769-99-4 review
- Like a House on Fire, (Scribe, 2012) ISBN 978-1-922070-06-7

Selected short stories

Title	Year	First published	Reprinted/collected	Notes
Cold snap	2006	???	Dark Roots; Kennedy, Cate (11 September 2006). "Black ice". The New Yorker.	Reprinted as "Black ice" in The New Yorker
Five dollar family	2009	Kennedy, Cate (Autumn 2009). "Five dollar family". Overland. 194: 28–37.		
Doisneau's kiss	2014	Kennedy, Cate (September 2014). "Doisneau's kiss". Australian Book Review. 364: 54–57.		

Anthologies (edited)

- Labour of Love : Tales from the World of Midwives, with Amanda Tattam (Macmillan, 2005)
- Love & Desire : Four Modern Australian Novellas (Five Mile Press, 2007)
- The Best Australian Stories 2011 (Black Inc, 2011)
- Australian Love Stories (Inkerman & Blunt, 2014)

=== Poetry ===
Collections

- Signs of Other Fires, (Five Islands Press, c2001) ISBN 0-86418-728-9
- Joyflight (Interactive Press, 2004) ISBN 1-876819-26-X API review
- Crucible and Other Poems, (Picaro Press, 2006)
- The Taste of River Water, (Scribe, 2011) ISBN 978-1-921844-00-3

=== Memoirs ===
- Sing, and Don't Cry : a Mexican Journal, (Transit Lounge, 2005) ISBN 0-9750228-1-4

== Sources ==
- "Canberra Writers win ANUTECH Competition", in The ANU Reporter, Vol. 28 No. 12
