= The Fish Girl =

2017 novella by Mirandi Riwoe

- Author: Mirandi Riwoe
- Genre: Fiction
- Publisher: Xoum Publishing
- Publication date: 2017
- Publication place: Australia
- Pages: 97
- ISBN: 9781925589061

The Fish Girl is a 2017 novella by Mirandi Riwoe. The story follows an Indonesian girl named Mina who is recruited to work in the kitchen of a Dutch merchant. It was written as a postcolonial subversion of the short story "The Four Dutchmen" by W. Somerset Maugham. The novella was shortlisted for the 2018 Stella Prize.

== Reception ==
The Fish Girl received positive reviews in Australian Women's Book Review, The Australian, and X-Press Magazine.

== Awards ==
Awards for The Fish Girl
Year	Award	Category	Result	Ref.
2018	Stella Prize	—	Shortlisted	
2018	Queensland Literary Awards	University of Queensland Fiction Book Award	Shortlisted	
