= Jessie Hickman =

Australian bushranger

- Prison photograph taken 15 August 1913
- Born: Elizabeth Jessie Hunt; 6 September 1890; New South Wales, Australia
- Died: September 1936 (aged 46); Newcastle, New South Wales, Australia
- Resting place: Sandgate Cemetery
- Occupations: circus roughrider; bushranger; duffer
- Spouse: Benjamin Hickman (m. 1920; sep. 1924)
- Children: 1

Elizabeth Jessie Hickman (née Hunt; 6 September 1890 – September 1936) was an Australian bushranger. She had multiple aliases but is often referred to as The Lady Bushranger. In the 1920s she established herself as leader of a gang of cattle thieves in the area that is now Wollemi National Park. Forgotten for several decades after her death, she has been the subject of two recent books: The Burial (The Untold in the US) by Courtney Collins (2012), and Out of the Mists: The Hidden History of Elizabeth Jessie Hickman (2014).

== Early life ==
Jessie Hickman was born in either Burraga or Carcoar, New South Wales. At the age of eight she was sent to live with a travelling circus, attaining a reputation as a skilled roughrider – she was named Australian Ladies Roughriding Champion in 1905 and 1906.

== Career ==
Hickman eventually became the ringmistress of Martini's Buckjumping Show, and may have been married to its one-time owner Martin Breheny (known as James Martini). In 1913 she had a son with Benjamin Hickman; the two married in 1920 and separated in 1924. She is rumored to have been married to an abusive third man, John Fitzgerald (known as "Fitzy"), whom she is alleged to have killed in self-defense.

Jessie Hickman was jailed twice in the 1910s for thefts. In the 1920s she established herself as leader of a gang of cattle thieves in the area that is now Wollemi National Park. She was charged with cattle rustling in 1918 and 1928, but was acquitted on both occasions. Her legendary exploits included "escap[ing] from custody while in a locked toilet aboard a moving train" and "steal[ing] cattle in a police holding yard".

== Death and legacy ==
Hickman died of a brain tumour in September 1936, aged 46, and was interred in an unmarked grave in Sandgate Cemetery. Although she was largely forgotten for several decades, she has recently been the subject of several books, including The Burial by Courtney Collins and Out of the Mists: The Hidden History of Elizabeth Jessie Hickman by Hickman's granddaughter Di Moore.
