= Alterations (film) =

- Written by: Cory Taylor
- Directed by: Julian Pringle
- Starring: Angela Punch-McGregor; Richard Moir
- Music by: Andrew Bell
- Country of origin: Australia
- Original language: English

Production
- Cinematography: Jeff Malouf
- Editor: Michael Honey
- Running time: 86 mins

Original release
- Network: ABC
- Release: 13 March 1988

Alterations is a two-part 1988 Australian television film for the ABC shot in 1987 at Canberra. It deals with a married couple and their respective affairs.

== Plot ==
Part One: Ann is having an affair with Michael, best friend of her husband Richard.

Part Two: What would happen if Richard had an affair with Eleanor.

== Cast ==
- Richard Moir as Richard
- Angela Punch-McGregor as Ann
- Linden Wilkinson as Martha
- Steven Jacobs as Michael
- Gillian Jones as Rachel
- Alan David Lee as Robert
- Kim Krejus as Eleanor
- Karen Linley as Alice (child in 1983)
- Michelle Linley as Alice (child in 1986)
- Tim Drummond as Duncan (child in 1983)
- Scott Bartle as Duncan (child in 1986)

== Reception ==
The Age called it "an enigmatic, might-have-been story of Adultery His, Adultery Hers in middle class Canberra, it is peopled with cold, unreachable characters who deliver Taylor's stacatto script - it barely contains a sentence of over three words - in deliberately stagey monotones."

The Sydney Morning Herald called it "more interesting than it was successful... nevertheless, it was a film well worth screening and watching."
