= Stone Sky Gold Mountain =

2020 novel by Mirandi Riwoe

- Author: Mirandi Riwoe
- Genre: Historical fiction
- Publisher: University of Queensland Press
- Publication date: 31 March 2020
- Publication place: Australia
- Pages: 264
- ISBN: 9780702262739

Stone Sky Gold Mountain is a 2020 novel by Mirandi Riwoe. The novel follows two Chinese siblings, Ying and Lai Yue, who move to Maytown during the Australian gold rushes. The novel won the 2020 ARA Historical Novel Prize and the Fiction Book Award at the 2020 Queensland Literary Awards. It was described by the judging panel of the Stella Prize as "a lyrical, character-driven piece of historical fiction that explores identity, friendship, belonging, and what it means to exist on a land that is not your own".

== Reception ==
The novel received generally positive reviews. In a review in The Saturday Paper, Cher Tan praised Riwoe's exploration of racism and misogyny in colonial Australia and her rich use of language, while noting that the novel's ending felt somewhat rushed. Mindy Gill likewise noted the novel's abrupt ending in a review for the Sydney Review of Books, but praised the novel for its compelling exploration of race and racial violence in early Australian history. Writing in Meanjin, Jinghua Qian wrote that the novel was a reminder of Chinese settlers' complicity in colonisation, but that its Aboriginal characters were not fully developed and that it occasionally slipped into "self-orientalising" tropes. Laura Elizabeth Woollett gave a positive review of the novel in Australian Book Review, writing that Riwoe "masterfully wields the interiority of marginalised characters to destabilise dominant colonial narratives".

== Awards ==
Awards for Stone Sky Gold Mountain
Year	Award	Category	Result	Ref.
2020	ARA Historical Novel Prize	—	Won	
2020	Queensland Literary Awards	The University of Queensland Fiction Book Award	Won	
2020	Queensland Literary Awards	Queensland Premier's Award for a Work of State Significance	Shortlisted	
2020	Queensland Literary Awards	The Courier-Mail People’s Choice Queensland Book of the Year Award	Shortlisted	
2021	Stella Prize	—	Shortlisted	
2021	Davitt Award	Adult Novel	Shortlisted	
2021	Australian Book Industry Awards	Small Publishers' Adult Book of the Year	Shortlisted	
2021	Miles Franklin Literary Award	—	Longlisted	
2021	Voss Literary Prize	—	Longlisted	
