= Hydra (novel) =

2022 novel by Adriane Howell

- Author: Adriane Howell
- Genre: Fiction
- Publisher: Transit Lounge
- Publication date: 1 August 2022
- Publication place: Australia
- Pages: 256
- ISBN: 978-1-925760-98-9

Hydra is a 2022 novel by Adriane Howell. The novel follows an antiques buyer named Anja who returns from the Greek island of Hydra, and whose behaviour slowly becomes increasingly irrational and erratic over the course of the novel. The book was described by reviewers as a "superbly creepy" novel with a "gothic streak". Hydra was shortlisted for the 2023 Stella Prize, where the judging panel wrote that it was "a truly weird and awe-some book in the best sense of those words, with an eccentricity that is never posturing or forced".

== Reception ==
Hydra received somewhat mixed reviews. A review in The Guardian said the novel had a "delicate atmosphere of jangle and paranoia" and praised its "frenzied" finale. Oliver Reeson gave a critical review of the book in the Sydney Review of Books, writing that what Hydra suffered from most was that its main character Anja "does very little except act weird and paranoid while not much really goes on around her". He concluded that while the book was "full of rich and affecting moments", its main character was so unlikeable and uncompelling that the novel fell flat. The book received a more positive review in the Canberra Times, where Jasper Lindell wrote that the book led the reader "on a path clear enough to follow and complex enough to make the following of it worthwhile". In The Conversation, Sally Breen wrote that the novel was "never dull", but that its ending contained too many implausible leaps.

== Awards ==
Awards for Hydra
Year	Award	Category	Result	Ref.
2024	South Australian Literary Awards	Fiction Award	Shortlisted	
2023	Stella Prize	—	Shortlisted	
2023	Readings Prize	New Australian Fiction Prize	Shortlisted	
