= The Choke (Laguna novel) =

2017 novel by Australian author Sofie Laguna

- Author: Sofie Laguna
- Language: English
- Genre: Literary novel
- Publisher: Allen & Unwin
- Publication date: 23 August 2017
- Publication place: Australia
- Media type: Print
- Pages: 369 pp.
- Awards: 2018 Indie Book Awards Book of the Year – Fiction, winner
- ISBN: 9781760297244

The Choke is a 2017 novel by the Australian author Sofie Laguna.

It was the winner of the 2018 Indie Book Awards Book of the Year – Fiction.

== Synopsis ==
In the 1970s, in the fictional town of Nullabri on the Victorian side of the Murray River, 10-year-old Justine Lee struggles with her alcoholic grandfather guardian, her undiagnosed dyslexia and rural poverty. She has no friends other than Michael who has cerebral palsy. With his help she attempts to navigate the world of male power and violence where she finds herself.

== Critical reception ==
James Ley, writing in Australian Book Review found the "style and the general tenor of [the author's] fiction are at times reminiscent of Tim Winton or Gillian Mears, and, more distantly, Sonya Hartnett." However, he also noted that this work is "content to perpetuate the rather tired notion that rural Australia is a site of poverty, backwardness, alcoholic indolence, and dysfunction."

In the Sydney Review of Books Sophia Barnes commented: "Children are at the centre of Laguna's novels, their perspectives emphatically privileged. Her protagonists are abused, neglected or simply overlooked by adults who have themselves been failed, and who re-enact the violence of which they too have been victims."

== Notes ==
- Dedication: For Marc, with love and gratitude. In memory of Aileen
- Epigraph: "Sapere aude" Horace, First Book of Letters

== Awards ==
- 2018 Indie Book Awards Book of the Year – Fiction, winner
- 2018 Stella Prize, longlisted
- 2018 ALS Gold Medal, shortlisted
- 2018 Victorian Premier's Prize for Fiction, shortlisted

== See also ==
- 2017 in Australian literature
