= Dying: A Memoir =

2016 memoir by Cory Taylor

- Author: Cory Taylor
- Genre: Memoir
- Publisher: Text Publishing
- Publication date: 16 May 2016
- Publication place: Australia
- Pages: 160
- ISBN: 9781925355772

Dying: A Memoir is a 2016 memoir by Australian author Cory Taylor. Taylor, suffering from terminal cancer, wrote the book over the course of just a few weeks as her health worsened and died within weeks of its publication. The book was shortlisted for the 2017 Stella Prize and was named as one of US President Barack Obama's top ten books of 2017. It was adapted into a play by Benjamin Law and is set to be staged by the Melbourne Theatre Company in a production starring Genevieve Morris in October 2025.

== Publication history ==
Cory Taylor was first diagnosed with advanced melanoma in 2005. As her health declined, she informed her publisher that she would not be able to complete her final novel as planned. Her publisher encouraged her to write about her experience of terminal illness instead. Taylor wrote Dying: A Memoir over the course of just a few weeks; a friend of Taylor's later wrote that her publisher "proofread sentences as they came in and typeset pages furiously", ultimately achieving the fastest publication in its history. The book was released in Australia by Text Publishing on 16 May 2016, shortly before Taylor's death in hospice care on 5 July. It was published in the United States by Tin House Books on 1 August 2017 and in the United Kingdom by Canongate Books on 6 July 2017.

== Reception ==
The book received positive reviews. In a review in The New York Times Review of Books, Jennifer Senior wrote that the book was "bracing and beautiful, possessed of an extraordinary intellectual and moral rigor". In The Guardian, Alice O'Keefe wrote that the book was both an effective memoir and an illumination of Western society's dysfunctional relationship with mortality. The book received a starred review in Publishers Weekly, which described the book as beautifully written and wrote that it was destined to become an important addition to the conversation surrounding death.

Many reviewers described the book as a "gift" to the living and praised Taylor's generosity in writing about her experience of dying. Reviewers also remarked on Taylor's commentary surrounding assisted suicide. Taylor had become an advocate for voluntary assisted suicide and had gone so far as to order a euthanasia drug from China, although she remarked in the book that she could never have gone through with taking her own life. Jennifer Senior wrote in her review of the book in The New York Times that Taylor was "a firm believer in taking custody of her own death" and that the book should be required reading for medical students. Publishers Weekly wrote that the book brought a fresh perspective to end-of-life care.

== Adaptation ==
Dying: A Memoir was adapted into a stage play by the author Benjamin Law, who had been a friend of Taylor's for over a decade. The play is set to be staged by the Melbourne Theatre Company in a production at the Arts Centre Melbourne directed by Jean Tong and starring Genevieve Morris in October 2025.

== Awards ==
Awards for Dying: A Memoir
Year	Award	Category	Result	Ref.
2016	Queensland Literary Awards	People's Choice Award	Shortlisted	
2017	Stella Prize	—	Shortlisted	
