= Take Care (poetry collection) =

2021 poetry collection by Eunice Andrada

- Author: Eunice Andrada
- Genre: Poetry
- Publisher: Giramondo Publishing
- Publication date: September 2021
- Publication place: Australia
- Pages: 72
- ISBN: 9781925818796

Take Care is a 2021 poetry collection by Eunice Andrada. The collection explores themes of rape culture, race, and the labour of care. It is divided into four parts: "Take", "Comfort", "Revenge", and "Care". The collection was shortlisted for the Stella Prize in 2022, the first year in which poetry was made eligible for the award, and was also shortlisted for awards at the New South Wales Premier's Literary Awards and the Queensland Literary Awards.

== Reception ==
In a review in The Saturday Paper, Eileen Chong wrote that in Andrada's poetry "the concept of “care” is examined through the lens of American imperialism and global capitalism, exploring how power and violence are intimately tied to varying forms of nurturing, reproduction and the maintenance of existing structures of dominance and control". Reviewing the collection in Australian Book Review, Prithvi Varatharajan described the work as a "coherent and artful collection", but expressed a wish that Andrada would incorporate more calligrams into her work in future. In a review published in the Sydney Review of Books, Patricia Arcilla wrote that Andrada "crafts work that both invites and disquiets her reader, exploring the generative and destructive potential of small, ritualised acts of care". In the Sydney Morning Herald, Jason Steger described the collection as "confronting, personal and political" and wrote that Andrada "plays around with poetic form in imaginative and effective ways".

== Awards ==
Awards for Take Care
| Year | Award | Category | Result | Ref. |
|---|---|---|---|---|
| 2022 | Stella Prize | — | Shortlisted | |
| 2022 | Queensland Literary Awards | Judith Wright Calanthe Award for a Poetry Collection | Shortlisted | |
| 2022 | New South Wales Premier's Literary Awards | Kenneth Slessor Prize for Poetry | Shortlisted | |
| 2022 | ALS Gold Medal | — | Longlisted | |
