= Sonya Voumard =

Australian writer and lecturer

- Occupations: Writer, lecturer

Academic background
- Education: RMIT University (B.A.); University of Technology Sydney (M.A., D.C.A.)
- Thesis: The Power Dynamics between Journalists and their Human Subjects (2015)

Academic work
- Institutions: University of Technology Sydney; Southern Cross University

Sonya Voumard is an Australian writer and lecturer who has taught non-fiction for many years at the University of Technology Sydney (UTS) and most recently at Southern Cross University. Voumard has published one work of fiction (2008), two book length works of non-fiction and many articles for Australian newspapers, magazines and literary journals. Prior to academia, Voumard spent over 20 years as a journalist working for major newspapers and magazines in Australia such as The Sydney Morning Herald and The Age. Voumard's academic articles have also been published in Meanjin, Griffith Review and Island.

In 2015, Voumard achieved a Doctorate of Creative Arts at UTS with her dissertation titled; "The Power Dynamics between Journalists and their Human Subjects".

As an author and an essayist, Voumard's work encompasses a variety of themes but specialises in the ethics of storytelling and questions of story ownership in the context of non-fiction and memoir.

Voumard's first work Political Animals (2008) was inspired by her time as a political correspondent for The Age in Canberra.

The Media and the Massacre (2016) was long listed for both the Stella Prize (2017) and the Nita Kibble Literary Award (2018).

In 2024 she published a memoir, ‘’Tremor’’, about her experience of living with the neurological movement disorder dystonia.
