= Sofie Laguna =

Australian novelist

- Born: 1968 (age 57–58); Sydney, New South Wales, Australia
- Writing career
- Language: English
- Years active: 2003–present
- Notable work: The Eye of the Sheep (2014)
- Notable awards: Miles Franklin Award, 2015

Sofie Laguna (born 1968) is an Australian writer of adult and children's fiction, and former actress. She is particularly known for her adult novel The Eye of the Sheep, which won the 2015 Miles Franklin Award, but has written more children's books and picture books than novels for adults. She has also written a play as well as a screenplay for her first adult novel, One Foot Wrong (2008).

== Early life and education ==
Sofie Laguna was born in Sydney, New South Wales, in 1968.

She studied law for a year at the University of New South Wales in 1985, which she had chosen for its proximity to the National Institute of Dramatic Art (NIDA), which is where she really wanted to study, but did not qualify to do so. She was 18 years old, and moved to Melbourne to pursue a career in acting, and "eventually" studied at the Victorian College of the Arts, graduating in 1992.

She later earned a Diploma of Arts from RMIT University.

== Career ==
Laguna worked as an actor for some years. She first appeared on stage in a production of The Diary of Anne Frank at the Phillip Street Theatre in Sydney. After moving to Melbourne, she performed in a number of stage productions until around 1993. She also had some roles in Australian television productions, including Blue Heelers and A Country Practice.

After turning to writing, she has written both adult and children's fiction, as well as a radio play titled Difficult to Grow, in 2000. Difficult to Grow was produced by Playbox Theatre's Theatre-in-the-Raw Readings in Melbourne and ABC Radio National. She later developed one of the characters created for the play, Pete Flick, as the main character in her 2014 novel The Eye of the Sheep, which earned her the 2015 Miles Franklin Award and was shortlisted for the Stella Prize and longlisted for the Dublin IMPAC Literary Award

She also wrote a screenplay for her 2008 novel One Foot Wrong, which was her first adult novel. The Melbourne Theatre Company optioned theatrical rights to produce her 2017 novel The Choke, which was shortlisted and longlisted for many awards, as well as winning the Fiction category of the Indie Book Awards.

Laguna's children's novels The Song of Lewis Carmichael (2021) and The Glow (2023) were both illustrated by her husband, artist and illustrator Marc McBride. In 2026 she collaborated with McBride, to produce a graphic novel, a first for both of them. Blunderbore, published by Penguin on 27 October 2026 in both hardback and ebook editions, is a retelling of the English fairy tale Jack and the Beanstalk, accompanied by McBride's black and white artwork created using in a number of techniques and mediums.

== Other roles ==
Laguna has presented writing workshops for adults and children at Nexus Arts in Adelaide as well as schools and libraries around Australia.

== Awards and nominations ==
- 2003: Honour book, Children's Book of the Year Award: Early Childhood for Too Loud Lily
- 2007: Honour book Children's Book of the Year Award: Younger Readers for Bird and Sugar Boy
- 2009: Longlisted, Miles Franklin Award for One Foot Wrong
- 2009: Shortlisted, Prime Minister's Literary Awards for One Foot Wrong
- The Eye of the Sheep
  - 2015: Shortlisted, Stella Prize
  - 2015: Winner, Miles Franklin Award
  - 2015: Commended, FAW Christina Stead Award
  - 2015: Longlisted, Dublin IMPAC Literary Award
- The Choke
  - 2018: Longlisted, Stella Prize for The Choke
  - 2018: Shortlisted, Voss Literary Prize for The Choke
  - 2018: Winner, Book of the Year in the Fiction category of the Indie Book Awards
  - 2018: Shortlisted, Victorian Premier's Literary Awards
  - 2018: Shortlisted, Australian Literature Society Gold Medal
  - 2018: Shortlisted, ABIA Award
  - 2018: Shortlisted, Voss Award
  - 2018: Longlisted, Kibble Award, Stella Prize, Dublin IMPAC Literary Award
- 2021: Longlisted, Miles Franklin Award for Infinite Splendours
- 2021: Winner, Colin Roderick Award for Infinite Splendours

== Personal life ==
As of 2026 Laguna is married to Marc McBride and living in Melbourne. They have children. In 2015, they were living on an 1-acre (0.40 ha) property near the outer Melbourne suburb of Eltham with their two young sons.

== Selected works ==
=== Adult novels ===
- One Foot Wrong (2008)
- The Eye of the Sheep (2014)
- The Choke (2017)
- Infinite Splendours (2020)
- The Underworld (2025)

=== Children's novels ===
- Bill's Best Day (2002)
- Bad Buster (2003)
- Surviving Aunt Marsha (2003)
- Big Ned's Bushwalk (2005)
- Bird and Sugar Boy (2006)
- Meet Grace (2011)
- A Friend for Grace (2011)
- Grace and Glory (2011)
- A Home for Grace (2011)
- The Grace Stories (2013)
- 1836 : Do You Dare? : Fighting Bones (2014)
- The Song of Lewis Carmichael (2021)
- The Glow (2023)

=== Picture books ===
- My Yellow Blanky (2002) with Tom Jellett (illustrator)
- Too Loud Lily (2002) with Kerry Argent (illustrator)
- On Our Way to the Beach (2004) with Andrew McLean (illustrator)
- Stephen's Music (2007) with Anna Pignataro (illustrator)
- Boris Monster, Scared of Nothing (2007) with Ben Redlich (illustrator)
- Where Are You, Banana? (2013) with Craig Smith (illustrator)
- The Last Egg (2025), with Jess Racklyeft (illustrator)
