= The Eye of the Sheep =

Novel by Sofie Laguna

- First edition
- Author: Sofie Laguna
- Language: English
- Publisher: Allen & Unwin, Australia
- Publication date: 2014
- Publication place: Australia
- Media type: Print (Paperback)
- Pages: 308
- ISBN: 9781743319598
- Preceded by: One Foot Wrong
- Followed by: The Choke

The Eye of the Sheep is a 2014 novel by Australian novelist Sofie Laguna which won the 2015 Miles Franklin Award.

== Notes ==
- Dedication: For TL, in memory.

== Abstract ==
"Ned was beside me, his messages running easily through him, with space between each one, coming through him like water. He was the go-between, going between the animal kingdom and this one. I watched the waves as they rolled and crashed towards us, one after another, never stopping, always changing. I knew what was making them come, I had been there and I would always know.

"Meet Jimmy Flick. He's not like other kids - he's both too fast and too slow. He sees too much, and too little. Jimmy's mother Paula is the only one who can manage him. She teaches him how to count sheep so that he can fall asleep. She holds him tight enough to stop his cells spinning. It is only Paula who can keep Jimmy out of his father's way. But when Jimmy's world falls apart, he has to navigate the unfathomable world on his own, and make things right."

== Reviews ==
- The Australian
- Readings

== Awards and nominations ==
- 2015: winner, Miles Franklin Award
- 2015: shortlisted, Stella Prize
- 2015: commended, The Fellowship of Australian Writers Victoria Inc. National Literary Awards — FAW Christina Stead Award

== See also ==
- 2014 in Australian literature
