= Cory Taylor =

Australian writer (1955–2016)

- Born: 1955; Southport, Queensland, Australia
- Died: 5 July 2016 (aged 61); Windsor, Queensland, Australia
- Education: Australian National University
- Occupation: Writer
- Spouse: Shin Koyama
- Children: 2
- Writing career
- Notable awards: Commonwealth Book Prize (2012)

Cory Taylor (1955 – 5 July 2016) was an Australian writer.

== Biography ==
Taylor was born in Southport, Queensland, and lived in Fiji and Kenya as a child. She studied history at the Australian National University, and then worked as a freelance film and television writer, with her work including the 1988 two-part television film Alterations for the ABC. Her first books were the Rat Tales and Bandaged Bear series of children's books.

Diagnosed with melanoma in 2005, Taylor turned to writing fiction and her 2011 début novel, Me and Mr Booker, won the Commonwealth Book Prize for the Pacific Region in 2012. Her next book, My Beautiful Enemy (2013), was shortlisted for the Miles Franklin Award.

As her health worsened, Taylor wrote her last book, Dying: A Memoir, which was published just before her death from melanoma-related brain cancer on 5 July 2016. The book was shortlisted for the 2017 Stella Prize and was included in Barack Obama's list of best books in 2017.

== Bibliography ==
=== Novels ===
- Me and Mr Booker, Melbourne: Text Publishing, 2010, ISBN 1921758112
  - German: Mr. Booker und ich, Berlin: List/Ullstein Verlag, 2019, ISBN 9783471351642
- My Beautiful Enemy, Melbourne: Text Publishing, 2013, ISBN 9781922079893

=== Children's ===
- Rat Tales, illustrated by Stephen Michael King, Sydney: Scholastic Australia, S1999, Vol. 1, Rat's Lucky Day and Rat Goes Fishing, ISBN 1863887393; Vol. 2, Rat and the Rude Cap and Rat and the Big Stink, ISBN 1863889876
- Bandaged Bear and the Broken Bones, co-authored with Peter Townsend, Sydney: Scholastic Australia, 2001, ISBN 1865043648
- Bandaged Bear Saves His Breath, co-authored with Peter Townsend, Sydney: Scholastic Australia, 2001, ISBN 1865043656
- Bandaged Bear and the Birthday Party, co-authored with Peter Townsend, Sydney: Scholastic Australia, 2002, ISBN 1865043664

=== Short stories ===
- "Wildlife", Best Australian Short stories 2010, edited by Cate Kennedy (2010)
- "Continental Drift", Griffith Review 34 (2011)
- "Unsuitable", Bumf (2014)
- "The White Experiment", Griffith Review 54 (2016)

=== Poetry ===
- "Monkey Business", Griffith Review 31 (2011)

=== Essays ===
- "Trouble at Dolphin Cove". Griffith Review. 27: 53–59. Autumn 2010.

=== Autobiography ===
- "Claiming the Dead", Griffith Review 48 (2015)
- Dying: A Memoir, Melbourne: Text Publishing, 2016, ISBN 9781925355772
