= Tegan Bennett Daylight =

Australian writer

- Born: Tegan Bennett; 1969 (age 56–57); Sydney, New South Wales
- Occupations: Author, teacher, critic
- Spouse: Russell Daylight
- Children: 2
- Website: Official website

Tegan Bennett Daylight (born 1969, in Sydney) is an Australian writer of novels and short stories. She is best known as a fiction writer, teacher and critic, publishing both books of non-fiction and numerous short stories. She has also written several books for children and teenagers. She is the author of Bombora (1996), What Falls Away (2001) and Safety (2006).

Bombora was short-listed for the Australian/Vogel Literary Award and the Kathleen Mitchell Award. In 2002, she was named one of The Sydney Morning Herald’s “Best Young Australian Novelists”.

Bennett Daylight's story collection Six Bedrooms, was published by Vintage in 2015 and was shortlisted for the 2016 Stella Prize.

Daylight also works as a Creative Writing lecturer at Western Sydney University.

Having moved from Sydney, she now lives in Katoomba in the Blue Mountains with her husband Russell Daylight and their two children.

== Publications ==
=== Novels ===
- Bombora (1996) published by Allen & Unwin
- What Falls Away (2001) published by Allen & Unwin
- Safety (2006) published by Vintage

=== Short stories ===
- Six Bedrooms (2015) published by Vintage Australia, an imprint of Penguin

=== Essays ===
- The Details (2020) published by Simon & Schuster Australia

== Awards and honours ==
- The Stella Interview - The Stella Price (2016)
- The Stella Prize Shortlist (2016)
- The Saturday Paper's Books of the Year (2015)
