= Mirandi Riwoe =

Australian author

Mirandi Riwoe is an Australian author based in Brisbane. In 2020 Riwoe won the Queensland Literary Award Fiction Book Award for her book Stone Sky Gold Mountain.

== Awards and honours ==
Riwoe is the author of Stone Sky Gold Mountain, set during the gold-rush era in Australia and told from the perspective of siblings Ying and Lai Yue, who have left China to seek their fortune in the gold fields. Stone Sky Gold Mountain that won the 2020 Queensland Literary Award Fiction Book Award and the inaugural ARA Historical Novel Prize. The judges for the ARA prize noted that 'The novel sheds light on a fascinating corner of history rarely illuminated in Australian literature.' Stone Sky Gold Mountain was shortlisted for the 2021 Stella Prize, the Australian Industry Book Awards Small Publishers Adult Book of the Year and longlisted for the 2021 Miles Franklin Award. The novel manuscript had previously been awarded a Queensland Literary Awards Writers Fellowship in 2017.

Riwoe's short story collection, The Burnished Sun, won the UQP Quentin Bryce Award; and her novella, The Fish Girl, won the 2017 Seizure Viva La Novella Prize and was shortlisted for The Stella Prize. Riwoe is also the author of She be Damned, a novel published as M. J. Tija as part of the Heloise Chancey historical crime series.

Riwoe's second novel, Sunbirds, was published by University of Queensland Press (UQP) in 2023. The novel is reviewed by Mia Ferreira in Arts Hub as 'a captivating escape to the romance and nostalgia of the Dutch East Indies on the cusp of World War II, where love and loyalties are tested and life is about to be immeasurably altered – Sunbirds by Queensland-based Mirandi Riwoe is one of those books that draws you into another place and time.' Sunbirds was shortlisted for the Barbara Jefferis Award in 2024.

== Works ==
- The Fish Girl 2017 (novella)
- Stone Sky Gold Mountain 2020 (novel)
- The Burnished Sun 2022 (short story collection)
- Sunbirds 2023 (novel)
- A Short History of Longans 2026 (novel)
- She Be Damned 2017, (as M. J. Tija)

Her stories have appeared in a number of anthologies:

- "Growth", The Best Australian Stories 2017, Maxine Beneba Clarke (editor) 2017
- Best Summer Stories, Aviva Tuffield (editor) 2018
- "Anna the Javanese", The Light Ascending : The Novella Project VII, Ashley Hay (editor) 2019
- "Cinta ku", We'll Stand in That Place : and other stories, Michelle Cahill (editor) 2019
- "So Wany Ways", New Australian Fiction 2020, Rebecca Starford (editor) 2020
- Minds Went Walking: Paul Kelly's Songs Reimagined, Mark Smith, Neil A. White and Jock Serong (editors) 2022
