= Lisa Jacobson =

Australian poet

- Occupation: Poet
- Writing career
- Notable work: The Sunlit Zone

Lisa Jacobson is an Australian poet. She is the author of two poetry collections, Hair and Skin and Teeth and South in the World, and a verse novel, The Sunlit Zone. She was the winner of the 2011 Bruce Dawe National Poetry Prize and the 2014 John Bray Poetry Award.

== Early life and education ==
Jacobson grew up in the outer suburbs of Melbourne and has Jewish and Latvian heritage. She holds a PhD in creative writing and works as a social worker.

== Writing ==
Jacobson's first poetry collection was the 1995 collection Hair and Skin and Teeth, which contains a series of poems addressed to her parents and grandmother. In a review in Australian Book Review, Ivor Indyk wrote that her poems were well-constructed and contained an interesting balance between themes of familial devotion and exploration of the painful aspects of these relationships.

Jacobson's 2012 work The Sunlit Zone is a verse novel of speculative fiction. It was originally written as her PhD thesis. In Australian Book Review, Peter Kenneally wrote that there was some immaturity to the work and that it told more than it showed, but that it had a strong overall impact on the reader. In The Australian, Liam Davison wrote that the novel had an engaging story and that its verse had an "elegiac quality" and "mythic impetus". In the Mascara Literary Review, Linda Weste wrote that the work had a "compelling narrative" and "meticulous poetic rhythm". The work was shortlisted for the Unpublished Manuscript Award at the 2009 Victorian Premier's Literary Awards and was shortlisted for the 2013 Stella Prize.

In 2014, Jacobson published her second poetry collection South in the World. The collection explores multiple themes, including childhood and relationships with horses and other animals. In a review in The Sydney Morning Herald, Geoff Page wrote that the poems were driven by intense emotion, but that they were at times too direct and led to a "diaristic" rather than a poetic effect. He also noted the range of themes explored in the collection, including Jewish issues and the Holocaust, the Black Saturday bushfires, and its inclusion of a "compelling" set of erotic poems. In Australian Book Review, Sarah Holland-Batt described the collection as having a "powerful interplay between the figurative and literal" and as being characterised by its "imaginative empathy".

== Works ==
- Hair and Skin and Teeth (Five Islands Press, 1995) ISBN 978-1-875604-33-3
- The Sunlit Zone (Five Islands Press, 2012) ISBN 978-0-7340-4746-5
- South in the World (UWA Publishing, 2014) ISBN 978-1-74258-602-1
