= Poum and Alexandre =

2016 memoir by Catherine de Saint Phalle

- Author: Catherine de Saint Phalle
- Genre: Memoir
- Publisher: Transit Lounge
- Publication date: 1 October 2016
- Publication place: Australia
- ISBN: 978-0-9943957-7-1

Poum and Alexandre is a 2016 memoir by French-Australian author Catherine de Saint Phalle. The book recounts de Saint Phalle's childhood growing up in Paris as the child of two eccentric parents. It was shortlisted for the 2017 Stella Prize.

== Reception ==
The book was reviewed in The Sydney Morning Herald, The Australian and Australian Book Review. In The Australian, Miriam Cosic praised de Saint Phalle's prose and the tension and suspense of her writing. In Australian Book Review, Kate Ryan wrote that the book "sails in poetic language and rich imagery", but that it was not entirely successful in illuminating the author's parents. Fiona Capp gave a positive review of the book in The Sydney Morning Herald, describing it as a work of "sustained intensity, tenderness and generosity of spirit".

== Awards ==
Awards for Poum and Alexandre
Year	Award	Category	Result	Ref.
2017	Stella Prize	—	Shortlisted	
