= An Uncertain Grace =

2017 novel by Kris Kneen

- Author: Kris Kneen
- Genre: Fiction
- Publisher: Text Publishing
- Publication date: 27 February 2017
- Publication place: Australia
- Pages: 256
- ISBN: 9781925355987

An Uncertain Grace is a 2017 novel by Kris Kneen. The book contains five interlinked stories and combines elements of the genres of speculative fiction and erotica, exploring themes of sexuality and post-humanism. The book was shortlisted for the 2018 Stella Prize.

== Summary ==
The novel is composed of five stories connected by their main character Liv. In the first, Liv sends a virtual reality bodysuit to her former lover so that he can experience their sexual relationship from her point of view. In the second, a sex offender named Ronnie has his consciousness fused with a jellyfish in order to commute his sentence. In the third, an android child who has been built to engage in relationships with pedophiles begins to develop his own consciousness. In the fourth, Liv encounters a teenager who is undergoing a technologically-enhanced gender transition. And in the final story, Liv, now 129 years old, develops a relationship with a sex worker.

== Reception ==
The book received generally positive reviews, but attracted some controversy. In a review in The Saturday Paper, a reviewer argued that the book's "sympathetic portrait of paedophilia and the naturalisation of child sexuality are deeply unsettling". The reviewer argued that Liv was a clear stand-in for the author, who they noted was known for her sexual libertarianism, and that the book's resulting self-righteousness was ultimately irritating. In a more positive review in The Sydney Morning Herald, Cameron Woodhead wrote that Kneen's "imaginative leap towards a transhuman world is endlessly curious and inventive, provocative and inspiring". Doug Wallen concurred in a review in The Australian, describing the book as a remarkably immersive read. A review in the Sydney Review of Books criticised Kneen's writing about technology for being unconvincing, but concluded that An Uncertain Grace was a "strange, daring and clever novel".

== Awards ==
Awards for An Uncertain Grace
Year	Award	Category	Result	Ref.
2018	Stella Prize	—	Shortlisted	
2017	Aurealis Award	Best Science Fiction Novel	Shortlisted	
