= Bad Art Mother =

2022 novel by Edwina Preston

- Author: Edwina Preston
- Genre: Fiction
- Publisher: Wakefield Press
- Publication date: 10 May 2022
- Publication place: Australia
- Pages: 336
- ISBN: 9781743059012

Bad Art Mother is a 2022 novel by Edwina Preston. The novel follows a poet named Vera in 1960s Melbourne who decides to give legal guardianship of her two-year-old son Owen to her childless friends in order to give herself greater time to write. The novel consists of six parts, each of which is composed of Owen's childhood memories followed by a collection of Vera's letters to her sister. The book, which was rejected 25 times before finding a publisher, was shortlisted for the 2023 Stella Prize.

== Reception ==
Bad Art Mother received generally positive reviews. A review in the Sydney Review of Books praised the "vibrant and familiar" quality of Preston's writing and wrote that the novel "reaches beyond the reductive ideals of good and bad mothering that have, I imagine, always plagued mothers". In Australian Book Review, Jane Sullivan wrote that the novel's greatest strength was its compelling child narrator, Owen. A review in The Saturday Paper agreed, writing that Preston "makes full use of the humour and insight provided by the child’s perspective". The novel was described by the Stella Prize judging panel as a "clever, warm, and very moving novel about motherhood, sacrifice, and the claims of art".

== Awards ==
Awards for Bad Art Mother
Year	Award	Category	Result	Ref.
2023	Stella Prize	—	Shortlisted	
