= Big Beautiful Female Theory =

2022 book by Eloise Grills

big beautiful female theory
- Author: Eloise Grills
- Genre: Graphic memoir
- Publisher: Affirm Press
- Publication date: 28 June 2022
- Publication place: Australia
- Pages: 304
- ISBN: 9781922626882

big beautiful female theory is a 2022 graphic memoir by Eloise Grills. Grills has described the book as an "illustrated collection of essays, and they’re all memoir in some way, about existing in a fat body and what that means". The book was shortlisted for the 2023 Stella Prize.

== Reception ==
big beautiful female theory received generally positive reviews. A review in Readings Monthly called the work a "boisterous examination of beauty standards, sexuality, misogyny, consumerism and the cruel vicissitudes of modern life". Reviewing the book in Overland, Jenny Hedley described it as an "antidote to diet culture, internalised misogyny and body dysmorphia" and "a joyride for people who’ve felt like aliens in their own bodies". A review in Meanjin described the book as "ecstatic, exhaustive self-expression, drenched in watercolour and hectic sincerity". In a piece in The Conversation, Penni Russon wrote that the book had some fragmentation in its structure and that it would have benefited from a more experienced comics publisher, but ultimately praised its message.

== Awards ==
Awards for big beautiful female theory
Year	Award	Category	Result	Ref.
2023	Stella Prize	—	Shortlisted	
2023	Indie Book Awards	Book of the Year – Illustrated Non-Fiction	Shortlisted	
