= Diving into Glass =

2019 memoir by Caro Llewellyn

- Author: Caro Llewellyn
- Genre: Memoir
- Publisher: Penguin Random House
- Publication date: 5 March 2019
- Publication place: Australia
- Pages: 336
- ISBN: 9780143793786

Diving into Glass is a 2019 memoir by arts executive and writer Caro Llewellyn. The memoir explores Llewellyn's relationship with her father Richard Llewellyn, a wheelchair user and disability activist, and her own diagnosis with multiple sclerosis. The book was shortlisted for the 2020 Stella Prize, where the judging panel described it as a "brilliantly constructed story that is at once gripping and tender".

== Reception ==
Diving into Glass received positive reviews. Louise Adler reviewed the book in The Australian, describing it as "something less expected, more nuanced and emotionally richer than literary gossip". In a review in the Sydney Morning Herald, Kate Holden described the book as an "absorbing and touching memoir" and reserved particular praise for Llewellyn's exploration of her relationship with her father. In a review in Australian Book Review, Astrid Edwards praised the memoir for its exploration of disability, ableism, and the relationship between parents and children, but noted that the work was more focused on Llewellyn's father and arts career than her own illness. Edwards, who also lives with multiple sclerosis, also criticised the book for at times using language that presents disability as a 'tragedy'.

== Awards ==
Awards for
Year	Award	Category	Result	Ref.
2020	Stella Prize	—	Shortlisted	
