= The Sunlit Zone =

2012 novel by Lisa Jacobson

- Author: Lisa Jacobson
- Genre: Verse novel
- Publisher: 5 Islands Press
- Publication date: 2012
- Publication place: Australia
- ISBN: 9780734047465

The Sunlit Zone is a 2012 verse novel by Lisa Jacobson. The novel is set in Melbourne in 2050, after the seas have risen and the land has dried out, and features characters who are hybrids of sea creature and human. The novel, which was originally written as Jacobson's PhD thesis, was shortlisted for the Unpublished Manuscript Award at the 2009 Victorian Premier's Literary Awards and was shortlisted for the 2013 Stella Prize.

== Reception ==
The Sunlit Zone received generally positive reviews. In Australian Book Review, Peter Kenneally wrote that there was some immaturity to the work and that it told more than it showed, but that it had a strong overall impact on the reader. In The Australian, Liam Davison wrote that the novel had an engaging story and that its verse had an "elegiac quality" and "mythic impetus". In the Mascara Literary Review, Linda Weste wrote that the work had a "compelling narrative and meticulous poetic rhythm".

== Awards ==
Awards for The Sunlit Zone
Year	Award	Category	Result	Ref.
2014	Adelaide Festival Awards for Literature	John Bray Poetry Award	Won	
2013	Stella Prize	—	Shortlisted	
2013	Prime Minister's Literary Awards	Poetry Award	Shortlisted	
2009	Victorian Premier's Literary Awards	Unpublished Manuscript Award	Shortlisted	
