= Emily Maguire (writer) =

Australian novelist

- Born: 1976 (age 49–50); Canberra, Australia
- Occupation: Novelist
- Writing career
- Notable awards: 2010 and 2013 The Sydney Morning Herald Best Young Australian Novelists, joint winner; 2025 Queensland Literary Awards — Fiction Book Award, winner

Emily Maguire (born 1976) is an Australian novelist and journalist.

== Early life and education ==
Maguire was born in Canberra in 1976. She grew up in the western suburbs of Sydney in a church-going family, but she now describes herself as agnostic. Maguire married in her early twenties to Jeff Maguire, whom she had known since the age of 14, over the initial objections of her family.

She has an MA in literature.

She became a professional writer in her mid twenties after working for the NRMA and Telstra.

== Writing ==
Maguire's articles and essays on sex, religion and culture have been published in newspapers and journals including The Sydney Morning Herald, The Australian Financial Review, The Age and The Observer. In 2007, the Women's Electoral Lobby awarded her the Edna Ryan Award (Media Category) for her writing about women's issues.

Maguire served as writer in residence at the Djerassi Artists Program in northern California in 2009, as an Asialink Literature Resident in Vietnam in 2008, and as a Tasmanian Writers' Centre resident in Hobart in 2006.

Her first novel, Taming the Beast (2004), was nominated for the Dylan Thomas Prize and received a Special Commendation in the Kathleen Mitchell Awards. The novel aroused controversy for its graphic depiction of a sexual relationship between a young woman and her high school teacher. Her second novel, The Gospel According to Luke is an account of a relationship between a young Christian pastor and an atheist abortion clinic worker, and deals with the theme of religious terrorism. It was also awarded a special commendation in the 2008 Kathleen Mitchell Awards.

Her 2008 non-fiction book, Princesses and Pornstars: Sex, Power, Identity, is an examination of how the treatment of young women as fragile and in need of protection can be just as objectifying and damaging to them as pornography and raunch culture. A revised young adult version called Your Skirt's Too Short: Sex, Power, Choice was released in 2010.

Fishing for Tigers, published in September 2012 by Picador Australia, is Maguire's fourth. Set in present-day Vietnam, it explores issues of exploitation in developing nations – cultural, racial, sexual and economic – placing Australian expats and tourists at the centre of the frame.

In May 2013, Maguire was named as one of The Sydney Morning Herald Best Young Australian Novelists.

In 2016 her book An Isolated Incident was published by Picador, Pan MacMillan Press. It was highly commended in the Victorian Premier's Literary Awards 2017; and was shortlisted for the 2017 Stella Prize, the 2017 Ned Kelly Awards, the ABIA 2017 Shortlist and the 2017 Miles Franklin literary award.

Maguire was awarded the 2018 Charles Perkins Centre Writer in Residence Fellowship, receiving a $100,000 grant.

Her novel Rapture won the Queensland Literary Award for Fiction and was shortlisted for the Prime Minister's Literary Award for Fiction and longlisted for the Stella Prize in 2025. It was also longlisted for the Adult category of the ARA Historical Novel Prize and won the inaugural Reader's Choice Award in 2025. In 2026 it won the People's Choice Award and was shortlisted for the Christina Stead Prize for Fiction at the New South Wales Premier's Literary Awards. It was also shortlisted for the 2026 Barbara Jefferis Award.

== Bibliography ==
=== Fiction ===
- Taming the Beast (2004)
- The Gospel According to Luke (2006)
- Smoke in the Room (2009)
- Fishing for Tigers (2012)
- An Isolated Incident (2016)
- Love Objects (2021)
- Rapture (2024)

=== Non Fiction ===
- Princesses and Pornstars: Sex, Power, Identity (2008)
- Your Skirt's Too Short: Sex, Power, Choice (2010)
- This is What a Feminist Looks Like: The rise and rise of Australian feminism (2019)

=== Contributed chapter ===
- "Global destroyers", pp. 87–98, in: Destroying the joint, edited by Jane Caro, Read How You Want (2015, ISBN 9781459687295).
