= Cactus Pear for My Beloved =

2024 book by Samah Sabawi

- Author: Samah Sabawi
- Genre: Memoir
- Publisher: Penguin Random House
- Publication date: 17 September 2024
- Publication place: Australia
- Pages: 336
- ISBN: 9781761344978

Cactus Pear for My Beloved is a 2024 book by Palestinian-Australian author Samah Sabawi. The book recounts the life of Sabawi's father Abdul Karim Sabawi, a Palestinian poet whose family experienced the Nakba during his childhood and who was exiled from Gaza after the Six-Day War, eventually settling in Queensland.

== Reception ==
The book was reviewed in The Conversation, The Saturday Paper, The Age, and the Journal of Holy Land and Palestine Studies. In her review for The Conversation, Michelle Hamadache praised Sabawi's ability to blend a deeply-researched historical account of her family history with fictionalised and dramatised elements. The book was shortlisted for the Stella Prize, where the judging panel wrote that the book had a "glorious sweeping scope and a light, elegant touch".

== Awards ==
Awards for
Year	Award	Category	Result	Ref.
2025	Stella Prize	—	Shortlisted	
2025	NSW Literary Awards	Douglas Stewart Prize for Non-fiction	Shortlisted	
2025	Prime Minister's Literary Award	Nonfiction	Shortlisted	
