= Eunice Andrada =

Australian poet

- Occupation: Poet
- Writing career
- Notable work: Take Care
- Notable awards: Victorian Premier's Prize for Poetry

Eunice Andrada is a Filipino-Australian poet. She is the author of three collections of poetry: Flood Damages, Take Care, and KONTRA.

== Career ==
In 2018, Andrada released her debut poetry collection, Flood Damages. The collection won the Anne Elder Award and was shortlisted for the Victorian Premier's Prize for Poetry and the Mary Gilmore Award. This was followed by her second collection, Take Care, in 2021. Take Care was shortlisted for the Stella Prize, the Judith Wright Calanthe Award, and two prizes at the New South Wales Premier's Literary Awards.

She released her third poetry collection, KONTRA, in 2025. The collection won the 2026 Victorian Premier's Prize for Poetry and was shortlisted for the Poetry prize at the 2026 Prime Minister's Literary Awards.

== Works ==
- Flood Damages (Giramondo Publishing, 2018) ISBN 9781925336665
- Take Care (Giramondo Publishing, 2021) ISBN 9781925818796
- KONTRA (Giramondo Publishing, 2025) ISBN 9781923106475
