= Samah Sabawi =

Palestinian playwright, scholar, author and poet (born 1967)

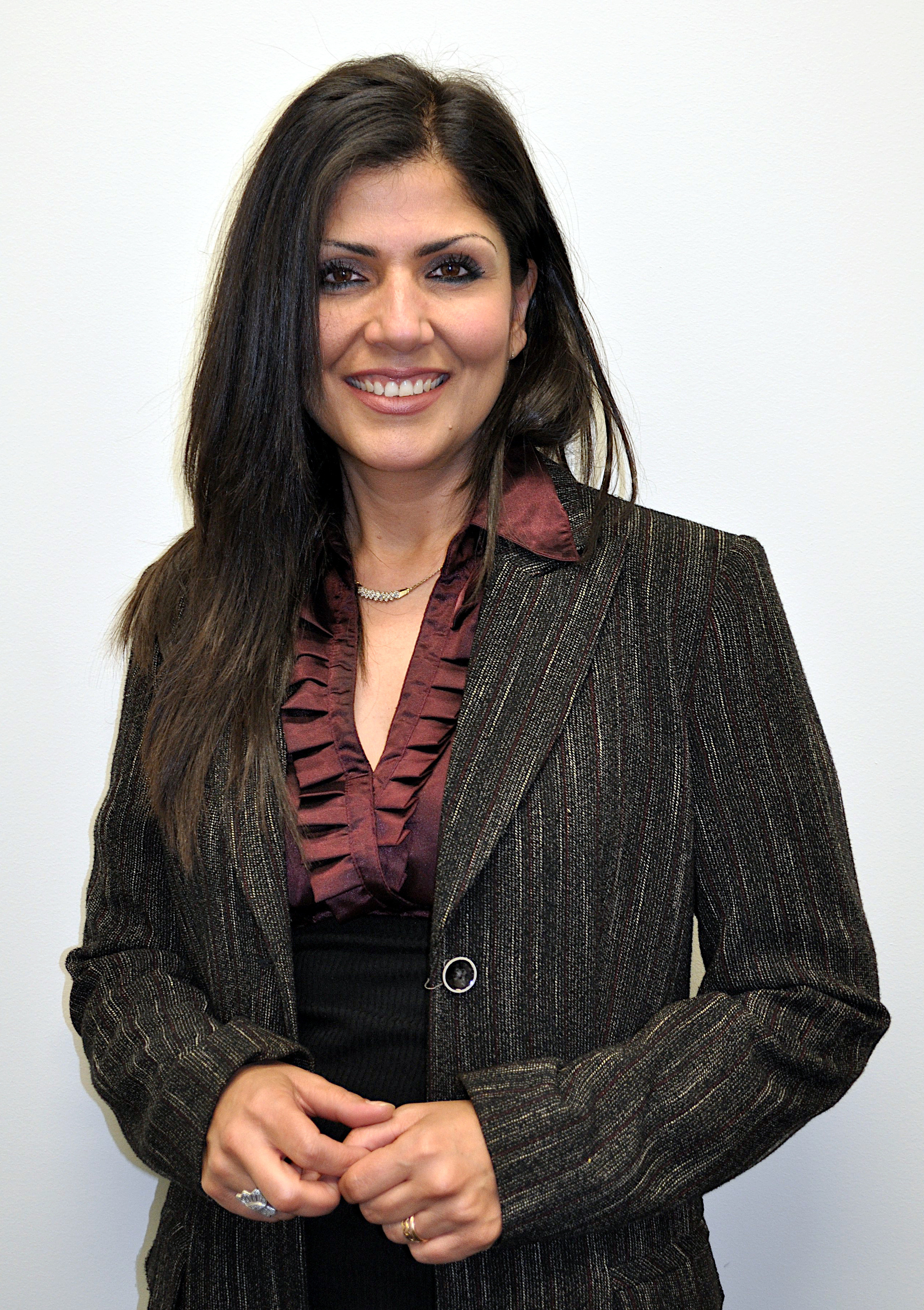
- Samah Sabawi before a press conference in Sydney, Australia
- Born: 1967 (age 58–59); Palestinian Territories
- Education: Monash University (BA); Griffith University (MA); Victoria University (PhD)

Samah Sabawi (Arabic: سماح السبعاوي; born 1967) is a Palestinian playwright, scholar, commentator and poet. Her plays include Cries from the Land (2003), Three Wishes (2008), Tales of a City by the Sea (2014) and Them (2019). Sabawi has received two Drama Victoria Awards, a Green Room Award, and a place in the VCE Drama curriculum for the latter two plays. Since 2014, Tales of a City by the Sea has been staged over 100 times in theaters and schools around the world. THEM was remounted in July 2021, with a premiere at the Arts Centre Melbourne before it tours through Shepparton, Bendigo, and Sydney.

Sabawi's essays and opeds have appeared in The Australian, Al Jazeera, Al-Ahram, The Globe and Mail, The Age, and The Sydney Morning Herald. She is a frequent guest/co-presenter on 774 ABC Melbourne's Jon Faine's Conversation Hour. She appeared alongside Israeli writer Ari Shavit, BBC News New York and UN Correspondent Nick Bryant, actress Miriam Margolyes, and numerous others.

Sabawi is a policy advisor to the Palestinian policy network Al Shabaka, and a member of the board of directors of the National Council on Canada-Arab Relations. She participated in various public forums on peace building, women in conflict areas, the Palestinian right of return, as well as various presentations for interfaith groups. Previously, she was a public advocate for Australians for Palestine, Executive Director and Media Spokesperson for the National Council on Canada-Arab Relations (NCCAR), and a Subject Matter Expert on the Middle East's cultural and political landscape for the Canadian Foreign Service Institute's Center for Intercultural Learning.

== Writings ==
Samah Sabawi has co-edited Double Exposure, an anthology of Jewish and Palestinian plays from diaspora for the Playwrights Canada Press. Her poetry has also been featured in various magazines and books, most recently in an anthology published by West End Press titled With Our Eyes Wide Open: Poems of the New American Century.

In 2016, Novum Publishing released I Remember My Name: Poetry by Samah Sabawi, Ramzy Baroud and Jehan Bseiso. The anthology aimed to feature "deeply personal and deeply political expressions of three gifted Palestinian poets in exile". The book received Middle East Monitor's 2016 Palestine Book Award.

Currency Press published the script of Tales of a City by the Sea in 2016, which was then listed on the VCE play list for Drama students years 11 and 12. At the Drama Victoria Awards, it earned the title of Best Publication for VCE in 2016.

In 2024 Penguin published Cactus Pear for My Beloved, about her family's life in Palestine and her parents' migration to Australia.

== Plays ==
Sabawi wrote and produced the plays Cries from the Land (2003) and Three Wishes (2008), both successfully received in Canada.

In November 2014, Sabawi's play Tales of a City by the Sea (described as a "Palestinian story of love and separation") premiered at La Mama Theatre in Melbourne, Australia and Al Rowwad Theatre, Palestine. With the venue entirely filled for each viewing, the play received highly positive reviews from The Sydney Morning Herald, The Music, The Australian Jewish Democratic Society and Melbourne Arts Fashion.

In 2018, Melbourne Theatre Company premiered a reading of Sabawi's Them, scheduled to premiere at La Mama Theatre (Melbourne) in 2019. Inspired by the psychology of civil conflict, Sabawi describes Them as a "tragicomedy about love, honour and sacrifice".

== Views on the Palestine-Israeli conflict ==
Sabawi's family left Gaza following Israel's occupation of the Strip in the Six-Day War. Although she has lived and worked in many countries around the world she still has "strong ties to her place of birth - ties that have shaped [her] work and identity". As a result of this she is fluent in both English and Arabic and has given speeches and interviews in both.

Sabawi has called for better representation of the Palestinian people She has, for example, criticised the Palestinian leadership for signing the Oslo Agreement. In her view, the Oslo Agreements were "designed to fragment the Palestinian people both physically and politically." She has been a consistent participant of Israeli Apartheid Week and a lifetime advocate for non-violent resistance.

== Wheeler Centre Incident ==
Sabawi was controversially dis-invited from a speaker panel at the Wheeler Centre in Melbourne, due to pressure from opposing speakers. Following a social media storm of protest, the Wheeler Centre reversed their decision. Sabawi joined Peter Beinart, Mark Baker, Or Avi-Guy, Maher Mughrabi and Dahlia Scheindlin in the event What we talk about when we talk about Israel/Palestine. The panel was later broadcast on ABC's Big Ideas and is currently viewable on the Wheeler Centre website.

== Awards and nominations ==
Year	Award	Work
2004	Canadian-Arab Foundation Award	
2008	Palestinian-Canadian Ottawa Community Award	
2016	Palestinian-Australian Community Achievement Award	Tales of a City by the Sea (2016)
2016	Australian-Muslim Achievements Award – Creative Artist of the Year	Tales of a City by the Sea (2016)
2016	Green Room Award – Best Independent Production (nomination)	Tales of a City by the Sea (2016)
2016	Drama Victoria Awards – Best Production	Tales of a City by the Sea (2016)
2016	Drama Victoria Awards – Best Publication for VCE Drama	Tales of a City by the Sea (2016)
2016	Palestine Book Awards – Creative Category (shared with Ramzy Baroud)	I Remember my Name (2016)
2017	Biennial Patrick O'Neill Award – Best play anthology (shared with Stephen Orlov)	Double Exposure (2016)
2020	Victorian Premier's Prize for Drama – Shortlist	Them (2019)
2025	Stella Prize – Shortlist	Cactus Pear for My Beloved (2024)
2025	Douglas Stewart Prize for Nonfiction, NSW Premier's Literary Awards – Shortlist	Cactus Pear for My Beloved (2024)
2025	Prime Minister's Literary Award for Nonfiction – Shortlist	Cactus Pear for My Beloved (2024)
