= An Isolated Incident =

2017 novel by Emily Maguire

- Author: Emily Maguire
- Genre: Fiction
- Publisher: Pan Macmillan
- Publication date: 22 March 2016
- Publication place: Australia
- Pages: 352
- ISBN: 9781760553562

An Isolated Incident is a 2016 novel by Australian writer Emily Maguire. The novel is a psychological thriller that describes the aftermath of the murder of a 25-year-old woman named Bella Michaels in the fictional town of Strathdee. The narrative explores the ways in which crimes against women are sensationalised in the media. Its title, An Isolated Incident, was chosen to express by Maguire's frustration with the media's tendency to treat episodes of violence against women as isolated incidents rather than as part of a broader pattern. The novel had a positive reception and was shortlisted for the 2017 Miles Franklin Literary Award and the 2017 Stella Prize.

== Reception ==
The novel received favourable reviews. In Australian Book Review, Jay Daniel Thompson wrote that the novel featured a few overly polemical passages, but that it was otherwise a "taut and timely text". In The Sydney Morning Herald, Anita Sethi wrote that the novel was a "hugely chilling and evocative story" and praised Maguire's ability to capture a wide spectrum of human emotion. In The Australian, Suzanne Leal praised Maguire's ability to balance an engaging narrative with a compelling exploration of society's treatment of women.

== Awards ==
Awards for An Isolated Incident
Year	Award	Category	Result	Ref.
2017	Stella Prize	—	Shortlisted	
2017	Miles Franklin Literary Award	—	Shortlisted	
2017	Ned Kelly Awards	Best Crime Novel	Shortlisted	
