= Little Gods =

2018 novel by Jenny Ackland

- Author: Jenny Ackland
- Genre: Fiction
- Publisher: Allen & Unwin
- Publication date: 21 March 2018
- Publication place: Australia
- Pages: 352
- ISBN: 9781760297114

Little Gods is a 2018 novel by Jenny Ackland. The novel follows a 12-year-old girl, Olive Lovelock, growing up in the Mallee region of Victoria, Australia. Olive learns that she once had a baby sister and decides to investigate her death. The novel was shortlisted for the 2019 Stella Prize.

== Reception ==
Little Gods received generally positive reviews. In a review in The Sydney Morning Herald, Owen Richardson wrote that parts of the novel would leave readers with unanswered questions, but that the novel's main character was compelling and that the story had charm. Louise Swinn likewise wrote in a review in The Australian that the novel had its occasional flaws, but that it was "baggy but hugely entertaining" and featured some highly compelling moments. A review in The Saturday Paper praised the quality of the novel's writing and wrote that it evoked strong nostalgia for the experiences of Australian childhood, succeeding in "conjuring up the magic of childhood and the cadences of a large raucous family".

== Awards ==
Awards for Little Gods
Year	Award	Category	Result	Ref.
2019	Stella Prize	—	Shortlisted	
