= The Erratics =

2018 book by Vicki Laveau-Harvie

- Author: Vicki Laveau-Harvie
- Genre: Memoir
- Publisher: Finch Publishing
- Publication date: 6/2018
- Publication place: Australia
- Pages: 224
- Awards: 2019 Stella Prize
- ISBN: 9780648100850

The Erratics is a 2018 memoir by Canadian-Australian author Vicki Laveau-Harvie. The book, which was Laveau-Harvie's first, explores the author's dysfunctional relationship with her mother, who experienced narcissistic personality disorder. The Erratics was the recipient of the 2019 Stella Prize and was shortlisted for the Douglas Stewart Prize for Nonfiction at the New South Wales Premier's Literary Awards.

== Summary ==
After Vicki Laveau-Harvie's mother is hospitalised for a fractured hip, she and her sister travel to their parents' home in Alberta, Canada to care for their elderly parents. Laveau-Harvie has been estranged from her parents for eighteen years, having moved to France as a young adult and then to Australia. When she arrives in Canada, she discovers that her father has been brainwashed, starved and imprisoned by her mother. Her mother, who has long been prone to narcissism and manipulative behaviour, is experiencing delusions. She and her sister attempt to have their mother institutionalised, fearing that she will kill their father once she is released from hospital. Eventually, her mother is placed in a mental health ward for ongoing treatment, and Laveau-Harvie returns to Sydney.

== Publication history ==
The Erratics was first published in June 2018 by the independent publisher Finch Publishing, which went out of business six months later. The out-of-print book was then picked up by HarperCollins after being unexpectedly longlisted for the Stella Prize, and was re-issued in March 2019. After winning the Stella Prize, the book was published by Penguin Random House in the United States in August 2020. Laveau-Harvie described the experience of going from her debut book falling out of print to winning a major literary award as "a fairytale".

== Reception ==
The book received positive reviews in the New York Times, the Sydney Review of Books, Kirkus Reviews, The Conversation and The Guardian. The Stella Prize judges' report writes that "the narrative is brimming with honesty, the narrator somehow manages to see all viewpoints, and we are rewarded with an evocative and expansive view of a family that has more than its fair share of dysfunction". Reviewers praised Laveau-Harvie's ability to balance grief and humour, as well as the quality of her writing and her vivid descriptions of the Canadian winter landscape. Camilla Nelson wrote in The Conversation that the book was both "remarkable" and "deeply uncomfortable", and that "where the rest of us would rather deal in easy platitudes, this book is deeply honest".

== Awards ==
Awards for The Erratics
Year	Award	Result	Ref.
2018	Finch Memoir Prize	Winner	
2019	Stella Prize	Winner	
2019	New South Wales Premier's Literary Award for Nonfiction	Shortlisted	
2021	Edna Staebler Award	Winner	
