= The Strays (novel) =

2014 novel by Australian author Emily Bitto

- Author: Emily Bitto
- Language: English
- Genre: Novel
- Publisher: Affirm Press
- Publication date: 1 May 2014
- Publication place: Australia
- Media type: Print
- Pages: 290 pp.
- Awards: 2015 Stella Prize winner
- ISBN: 9781922213211

The Strays is a 2014 novel by the Australian author Emily Bitto, her first. It won the 2015 Stella Prize.

The Strays is a fictionalisation of the 1930s group of Australian artists known as the Heide Circle. Bitto has said that she "tried to capture (...) the romance and excitement of that circle; the sense of the new that stirred the stale waters of outer Melbourne when a group of artists came together to work and live side by side, to buck the establishment and create their own small utopia within the confines of an old house and a large, thriving garden."

The Age described it as "an eloquent portrayal of the damage caused by self-absorption as well as a moving study of isolation". It was awarded the A$50,000 Stella Prize for the best book of fiction or nonfiction by an Australian woman. The Stella Prize judges described The Strays as "like a gemstone: polished and multifaceted, reflecting illuminations back to the reader and holding rich colour in its depths."

== Synopsis ==
In her old age Art History lecturer Lily recalls her childhood in 1930s Melbourne when she had a friendship with Eva Trentham, daughter of the famous artists Evan and Helena Trentham.

== Critical reception ==
James Tierney reviewed the novel for the Australian Book Review and noted that "Bitto has a deep interest in the transformative power of memory, in how life’s chaos is shaped into story."

Writing for the Text journal Ruby Todd called the book "elegant", noting that she has created a "resonant novel".

== Publishing history ==
After the novel's initial publication in Australia in 2014 by Affirm Press it was reprinted as follows:

- Affirm Press, Australia, 2015
- Legend Press, UK, 2016
- Twelve, 2018, USA
- Affirm Press, Australia, 2021

== Awards ==
- 2013 Victorian Premier's Literary Awards — Prize for an Unpublished Manuscript by an Emerging Victorian Writer, shortlisted
- 2015 Stella Prize, winner
- 2015 Indie Book Awards Book of the Year – Debut Fiction, shortlisted
- 2015 Nita Kibble Literary Awards — Dobbie Award, shortlisted
- 2015 New South Wales Premier's Literary Awards — UTS Glenda Adams Award for New Writing, shortlisted
- 2016 International IMPAC Dublin Literary Award, longlisted

== Notes ==
The author was interviewed by The Guardian newspaper after the novel was shortlisted for the Stella Prize.

== See also ==
- 2014 in Australian literature
