= Patti Miller =

Australian writer (born 1954)

Patti Miller (born 1954), an Australian writer, was born and grew up near Wellington, New South Wales, Australia. She holds a BA (Communications) and an MA (Writing) from the University of Technology, Sydney (UTS). She is the author of ten books and numerous articles and essays published in national newspapers and literary magazines. She has taught literature and writing at UTS, University of Western Sydney, Australian Writers' Centre and other writers’ centres and is the founder and director of its Life Stories Workshop, which aims to develop and support memoir and creative non-fiction writing. Miller is a member of the Australian Society of Authors.

== Works ==
- Miller, Patti (1994). Writing Your Life (1 ed.). Allen & Unwin. ISBN 1863736417.
- — (1997). The Last One Who Remembers. Allen & Unwin. ISBN 1864483946.
- — (1998). Child. Allen & Unwin. ISBN 1864486953.
- — (2001). Writing Your Life (2 ed.). Allen & Unwin. ISBN 1865084344.
- — (2003). Whatever The Gods Do. Vintage Random House. ISBN 1740512332.
- — (2007). The Memoir Book. Allen & Unwin. ISBN 9781741149067.
- — (2012). The Mind of a Thief. University of Queensland Press. ISBN 9780702249365.
- — (2015). Ransacking Paris. University of Queensland Press. ISBN 9780702253393.
- — (2017). Writing True Stories. Allen & Unwin. ISBN 9781760293086.
- — (2019). The Joy of High Places. NewSouth Books. ISBN 9781742236513.
- — (2022). True Friends. University of Queensland Press. ISBN 9780702265549.
- "Dirty dozen don't stay home". Sun Herald. Sydney. 28 December 2010.
- "Sex and drugs and Patrick White", Eureka St, 12 June 2012
- "Erasure of an Aboriginal temple", Eureka St, 2 May 2012

== Awards and recognition ==
Miller's seventh book, The Mind of a Thief, won the 2013 NSW Community and Regional History Prize in the NSW Premier's History Awards and was long-listed for the Stella Prize in 2013., long-listed for the Nita Kibble Award 2013 and shortlisted for the WA premier's Prize for Non-Fiction.
