= Jenny Ackland =

Australian author

- Occupation: Writer
- Writing career
- Notable work: Little Gods

Jenny Ackland is an Australian writer. She has written three books—Secret Son, Little Gods, and Hurdy Gurdy. Her second novel, Little Gods, was shortlisted for the 2019 Stella Prize.

== Career ==
Ackland's first novel, Secret Son, was published in 2015 and follows a Turkish-Australian man named Cem Keloglu. He travels back to Turkey, to the same village the "secret son" of Ned Kelly settled after he was left in Turkey following the Gallipoli campaign. In a review in The Australian, Peter Pierce praised the novel's ability to move smoothly between places and timelines, and wrote that it had "originality and dash". In The Sydney Morning Herald, Anna Creer echoed Pierce's praise of Ackland's ability to move smoothly between the past and the present. In Australian Book Review, Katerina Bryant praised the quality of Ackland's writing and described the work as a fine debut novel, but criticised the abruptness of its ending.

In 2018, Ackland published her second novel, Little Gods. The novel follows a 12-year-old girl, Olive Lovelock, growing up in the Mallee region of Victoria, Australia. Olive learns that she once had a baby sister and decides to investigate her death. The novel was shortlisted for the 2019 Stella Prize. In a review in The Sydney Morning Herald, Owen Richardson wrote that parts of the novel would leave readers with unanswered questions, but that the novel's main character was compelling and that the story had charm. Louise Swinn likewise wrote in a review in The Australian that the novel had its occasional flaws, but that it was "baggy but hugely entertaining" and featured some highly compelling moments. A review in The Saturday Paper praised the quality of the novel's writing and wrote that it evoked strong nostalgia for the experiences of Australian childhood, succeeding in "conjuring up the magic of childhood and the cadences of a large raucous family". The novel was shortlisted for the 2019 Stella Prize.

Ackland's third novel, Hurdy Gurdy, was published in 2024. The novel is about an all-female circus troupe in a dystopian near-future who secretly carry out abortions. The novel received a negative review from Beejay Silcox in The Guardian, where she described the novel as "toothless" and criticised its simplistic and derivative political messaging. In The Saturday Paper, Fiona Murphy gave a more sympathetic review and described the novel as a "clarifying, deep-chested howl" and a "blazing feminist revenge novel".

== Works ==
- Secret Son (Allen & Unwin, 2015) ISBN 978-1-925266-16-0
- Little Gods (Allen & Unwin, 2018) ISBN 978-1-76029-711-4
- Hurdy Gurdy (Allen & Unwin, 2024) ISBN 978-1-76106-979-6
