= Edwina Preston =

Australian author and musician

- Occupations: writer and musician
- Notable work: Not Just a Suburban Boy; The Inheritance of Ivorie Hammer

Edwina Preston is a Melbourne-based writer and musician. Preston is the author of a biography of Australian artist Howard Arkley, Not Just a Suburban Boy (Duffy & Snellgrove, 2002), and the novel The Inheritance of Ivorie Hammer (University of Queensland Press, 2012). Her writing and reviews have appeared in The Age, The Australian, The Guardian, The Sydney Morning Herald, Heat, Island and Griffith Review.

She released a spoken-word CD, Hirsute, in 1997 (ABC Audio) and performed around Melbourne. Alicia Sometimes described Preston as "melting the stage with a harpist by her side". She plays keyboards and sings in Harry Howard and the NDE (Spooky Records) with Harry Howard, Dave Graney and Clare Moore, and in ATOM (IT Records) with Harry Howard and Ben Hepworth (Repairs, Exek). She is a featured vocalist in the occasional performing group Pop Crimes: The Songs of Rowland S Howard.

In May 2021, Wakefield Press announced that they will publish Edwina's new novel, "provisionally titled Veda Grey" in May 2022. The book was subsequently published as Bad Art Mother and shortlisted for the 2023 Christina Stead Prize for Fiction at the New South Wales Premier's Literary Awards and shortlisted for the 2023 Stella Prize.
