= No Document =

2021 book by Anwen Crawford

- Author: Anwen Crawford
- Genre: Non-fiction
- Publisher: Giramondo Publishing
- Publication date: April 2021
- Publication place: Australia
- Pages: 160
- ISBN: 9781925818611

No Document is a 2021 non-fiction book by Anwen Crawford. The book is primarily composed as a tribute to Crawford's friend Ned Sevil, who died at the age of 30 of cystic fibrosis. No Document is a work of experimental non-fiction, described in the Sydney Morning Herald as "interweaving poetry, extracts from letters, news reports, fragments of history, activism and commentary". The book was shortlisted for the 2022 Stella Prize.

== Reception ==
The book received positive reviews. In a review in The Saturday Paper, Declan Fry called the work "a masterpiece" and "a book that demands your heart". A review by Alix Beetson in the Sydney Review of Books labelled the work "remarkable" and wrote that it was "an attempt to discover a form of writing fit for ephemeral art practices". Reviewing the book in Australian Book Review, Francesca Sasnaitis described the book as "an inventive combination of poetic devices and documentary fragments in a paean to friendship and creativity, and an elegy for a lost friend". The book was named one of the 25 best Australian books of 2021 by The Guardian, which labelled it an "experimental elegy" that is "expansive in thought and an utterly original work of creative nonfiction".

== Awards ==
Awards for No Document
Year	Award	Category	Result	Ref.
2022	Stella Prize	—	Shortlisted	
