= The Invisible History of the Human Race =

2014 book by Christine Kenneally

- Author: Christine Kenneally
- Genre: Non-fiction
- Publisher: Black Inc
- Publication date: 2014
- Publication place: Australia
- Pages: 320
- ISBN: 9781922231956

The Invisible History of the Human Race is a 2014 non-fiction book by science journalist and author Christine Kenneally. The book explores how DNA can help to explain human history. It was published in Australia by Black Inc and in the United States by Viking Press. The book was shortlisted for the 2015 Stella Prize and was named one of the 100 most notable books of 2014 by The New York Times Review of Books. In an interview in The Guardian, Kenneally explained that her goal in writing the book was to link together the science of genetics and individual experiences of genealogical research, as well as to provide a defence of the growing popularity of genealogy.

== Reception ==
The Invisible History of the Human Race was reviewed in The Monthly, The New York Times, The New York Times Review of Books, Australian Book Review, Kirkus Reviews and Publishers Weekly. In the New York Times Review of Books, David Dobbs praised Kenneally's lively writing style and the book's breadth. The book received a starred review in Publishers Weekly, which highlighted its interdisciplinary exploration of science, social science, and philosophy. In Australian Book Review, Miriam Cosic wrote that the book was wide-ranging, thought-provoking, and filled with fascinating details.

== Awards ==
Awards for The Invisible History of the Human Race
Year	Award	Category	Result	Ref.
2015	Stella Prize	—	Shortlisted	
2015	Queensland Literary Awards	History Book Award	Shortlisted	
