= Christine Kenneally =

Australian-American journalist

Christine Kenneally (born in Melbourne, Australia) is an Australian-American journalist who writes on science, language and culture. Trained as a linguist, she has written for The New York Times, the New Yorker, Slate, New Scientist, and Australia's Monthly, among other publications. She is a great-granddaughter of JJ Kenneally, an early populariser of Australian bushranger Ned Kelly.

Her first book, The First Word (2007) was a Los Angeles Times book prize finalist and has been translated into Korean and Spanish. Her book for Viking Penguin, The Invisible History of the Human Race, was released 9 October 2015.

== Early life and education ==
Kenneally grew up in Melbourne, Australia and received an Honors BA in English and Linguistics from Melbourne University and completed a PhD in Linguistics at Cambridge University in England. At Cambridge she learned to row with the First and Third Trinity Boat Club, eventually rowing for the Cambridge University Women's Boat Club in the lightweight squad, participating in races on the Thames and against Oxford at Henley.

In the early 1990s, while at the University of Melbourne, she attended an introductory lecture in linguistics. When she asked the lecturer where language came from, the lecturer responded that linguists do not really explore that topic, or even ask the question, because there is no definitive way to answer it. This always stayed with Kenneally, and when she became a writer, the question became the basis of her first book.

== Career ==
After living in Iowa City for two and a half years, she moved to New York City, where she started writing for Feed, the Internet's first magazine, founded by Stephanie Syman and Steven Johnson, among other publications.

=== Journalism, 2003-present ===
Her science articles include one about the new field of epigenetics, the study of the forces that act on and effect alterations to DNA (not caused by change in sequencing) and another about the sensory abilities of animals that may have allowed them to have survived the 2004 Indian Ocean tsunami for Salon. Her work for the New Yorker include a feature on hemispherectomy, the most radical form of brain surgery, where half of the brain is removed, and coverage of 2009's Black Saturday bushfires, the deadliest series of brushfires in Australia's history. Her work for The New York Times includes science articles centered around language's impact on perception, news and cultural reportage from Australia, and numerous book reviews—covering everything from essay books by Stephen Jay Gould and Richard Dawkins, to a book about proto-Indo-European language to a work of fiction for 9- to 12-year-olds set in Victorian England.

Her writing for the Monthly includes a feature on the Forgotten Australians, the 500,000 Australians that received institutionalized or other care in the 20th century, and another about questionable real estate news coverage. Her story about digital archiving for an politics and arts publication won her Australian Society of Archivists' Mander Jones Award. Her work for the New Scientist includes an article about the debate about the impact of the Human Genome Project and the unspecialness of being human.

In August 2018, BuzzFeed News published her story about physical and sexual abuse that allegedly happened at St. Joseph's Orphanage in Burlington, Vermont. Having taken four years of investigation, it is part of an assessment of Catholic-led orphanages that has happened in the UK, Canada, Germany, Australia, and Ireland but has yet to happen in the US. Kenneally was interviewed on NPR's All Things Considered, and Burlington's WCAX, the CBS affiliate which covered the 1993 complaint to the US district court. and the work is receiving national attention, including responses from Bishop Christopher Coyne, and the state's attorney general.

=== The First Word, 2007 ===
Her first book, The First Word: The Search for the Origins of Language, is about the relatively new field of evolutionary linguistics starring such figures as cognitive scientist Philip Lieberman, primatologist Sue Savage-Rumbaugh, psychologists Steven Pinker and Paul Bloom, and evolutionary biologists Tecumseh Fitch and Marc Hauser. She interviewed all of these scientists for the book. Lieberman, a former student of Noam Chomsky, broke from his mentor's insistence that language could not be explained by evolutionary theory. Among other work, he studied the human brain to find support for the idea that language evolved from organs like the basal ganglia that human beings share with members of other species. Savage-Rumbaugh, who taught a bonobo a toddler-level communication system, views language "as a communicative system that has roots in and shares features with the communicative capacity of apes". Pinker in turn upheld the idea that Chomsky's linguistic theories could work with theories of evolution such as natural selection, and he with then-graduate student Bloom published a paper which posited that language could be compared with other complex abilities like echolocation and stereopsis. This paper, which also challenged the ideas of Stephen Jay Gould, importantly allowed many more researchers to treat the study of the evolution and origin of human language seriously.

The First Word also details how Tecumseh Fitch found that the human larynx, responsible for the enunciation of vowels and consonants, is also found in animals such as koalas and lions, and that animals too have a complex inner life "without the benefit of syntax or words". Kenneally also details the work of University of Edinburgh linguist Simon Kirby who, using computer modelling, has suggested that language, much like a computer virus, is self-evolving.

The New Yorker called the book an "accessible account", the Scientific American described its discourse as "elegant", and William Grimes of The New York Times wrote that Kenneally "covers an enormous expanse of ground" and is "scrupulously fair-minded".

=== The Invisible History of the Human Race, 2014 ===
Kenneally's second book, The Invisible History of the Human Race, draws on cutting-edge research to reveal how both historical artifacts and DNA tell us where we come from and where we may be headed. She interviews molecular biologists about genes' influence on physical characteristics, population geneticists attempting to reconstruct the genetic composition of centuries-old populations, genealogists looking to trace family lineages, and those in charge of the Mormon genealogical database.

The book received a starred review from Publishers Weekly, who stated, "Kenneally offers a rich, thoughtful blend of science, social science, and philosophy in a manner that mixes personal history with the history of the human species." It was shortlisted for the 2015 Stella Prize.

== Award and distinctions ==
- Los Angeles Times book prize finalist for The First Word, 2008
- Australian Society of Archivists' Mander Jones Award, 2010, for "Archive This" in the Monthly
- Bushfire piece in the New Yorker included in The Best Australian Essays 2010 and the Best Australian Essays: A Ten Year Collection
- February 2011 Monthly article on lice included in The Best Australian Science Writing 2011
- Ned Kelly piece for The New York Times included in The Best Australian Science Writing 2012
- Douglas Stewart Prize for Non-fiction, New South Wales Premier's Literary Awards, winner for Ghosts of the Orphanage

== Personal life ==
Her paternal great-grandfather was James Jerome Kenneally, aka JJ Kenneally, who wrote The Inner History of the Kelly Gang, the first book to make the case for Australia's now-famous bushranger, Ned Kelly at a time when the Irish in Australia were still treated with prejudice. The book inspired, among other things, Australian painter Sidney Nolan to create his iconic series of paintings of Kelly that now hang in the National Gallery of Australia in Canberra. Kenneally herself wrote about the discovery of Kelly's skeleton for The New York Times in 2011, and the article was in included in The Best Australian Science Writing 2012.
