= Stella Prize =

Australian literary award for women and non-binary writers

- Awarded for: Australian women’s contribution to literature
- Location: Australia
- Reward: A$60,000
- First award: 2013; 13 years ago
- Website: https://stella.org.au/

The Stella Prize is an Australian annual literary award established in 2013 for writing by Australian women in all genres, worth $60,000. It was originally proposed by Australian women writers and publishers in 2011, modelled on the UK's Baileys Women's Prize for Fiction (formerly the Orange Prize for Fiction).

The award derives its name from the author Miles Franklin, whose full name was "Stella Maria Sarah Miles Franklin."

It was established by a group of 11 Australian women writers, editors, publishers and booksellers who became concerned about the poor representation of books by women in Australia's top literary prize, the Miles Franklin Award.

"After a rapid acceleration in women's rights in the '70s and '80s, things have started to go backwards," Sophie Cunningham said in a keynote address at the 2011 Melbourne Writers' Festival. "Women continue to be marginalised in Australian culture and the arts sector – which likes to pride itself on its liberal values – is, in fact, complacent. Women are much less likely to win literary awards, to write reviews of books, or have their books reviewed. This, despite the fact they write about half the books published."

Some commentators, such as Erin Handley writing in The Age, have said that fiction and non-fiction are different genres that should be judged separately, highlighting that this is an issue for the Stella Prize. But this is rejected by Dr. Kerryn Goldsworthy, the chair of the Stella judging panel, who stated that comparing fiction and non-fiction is "no harder than comparing books in general," and that "excellence is achievable in any form."

The 2021 Stella Prize guidelines opened entries to books by non-binary as well as women writers.

== Award honorees ==
=== 2013 to 2019 ===
Stella Prize winners, shortlists, and longlists
Year	Author	Title	Result	Ref.
2013	Carrie Tiffany	Mateship with Birds	Winner	
2013	Courtney Collins	The Burial	Shortlist	
2013	Michelle de Kretser	Questions of Travel	Shortlist	
2013	Lisa Jacobson	The Sunlit Zone	Shortlist	
2013	Cate Kennedy	Like a House on Fire	Shortlist	
2013	Margo Lanagan	Sea Hearts	Shortlist	
2013	Romy Ash	Floundering	Longlist	
2013	Dylan Coleman	Mazin Grace	Longlist	
2013	Robin de Crespigny	The People Smuggler	Longlist	
2013	Amy Espeseth	Sufficient Grace	Longlist	
2013	Patti Miller	The Mind of a Thief	Longlist	
2013	Stephanie Radok	An Opening	Longlist	
2014	Clare Wright	The Forgotten Rebels of Eureka	Winner	
2014	Hannah Kent	Burial Rites	Shortlist	
2014	Anna Krien	Night Games: Sex, Power and Sport	Shortlist	
2014	Fiona McFarlane	The Night Guest	Shortlist	
2014	Kristina Olsson	Boy, Lost: A Family Memoir	Shortlist	
2014	Alexis Wright	The Swan Book	Shortlist	
2014	Debra Adelaide	Letter to George Clooney	Longlist	
2014	Gabrielle Carey	Moving Among Strangers: Randolph Stow and My Family	Longlist	
2014	Melissa Lucashenko	Mullumbimby	Longlist	
2014	Anne Summers	The Misogyny Factor	Longlist	
2014	Helen Trinca	Madeleine: A Life of Madeleine St John	Longlist	
2014	Evie Wyld	All the Birds, Singing	Longlist	
2015	Emily Bitto	The Strays	Winner	
2015	Maxine Beneba Clarke	Foreign Soil	Shortlist	
2015	Christine Kenneally	The Invisible History of the Human Race	Shortlist	
2015	Sofie Laguna	The Eye of the Sheep	Shortlist	
2015	Joan London	The Golden Age	Shortlist	
2015	Ellen van Neerven	Heat and Light	Shortlist	
2015	Ceridwen Dovey	Only the Animals	Longlist	
2015	Helen Garner	This House of Grief	Longlist	
2015	Sonya Hartnett	Golden Boys	Longlist	
2015	Alice Pung	Laurinda	Longlist	
2015	Inga Simpson	Nest	Longlist	
2015	Biff Ward	In My Mother’s Hands	Longlist	
2016	Charlotte Wood	The Natural Way of Things	Winner	
2016	Tegan Bennett Daylight	Six Bedrooms	Shortlist	
2016	Peggy Frew	Hope Farm	Shortlist	
2016	Elizabeth Harrower	A Few Days in the Country: And Other Stories	Shortlist	
2016	Mireille Juchau	The World Without Us	Shortlist	
2016	Fiona Wright	Small Acts of Disappearance: Essays on Hunger	Shortlist	
2016	Debra Adelaide	The Women's Pages	Longlist	
2016	Stephanie Bishop	The Other Side of the World	Longlist	
2016	Jen Craig	Panthers and the Museum of Fire	Longlist	
2016	Gail Jones	A Guide to Berlin	Longlist	
2016	Amanda Lohrey	A Short History of Richard Kline	Longlist	
2016	Alice Robinson	Anchor Point	Longlist	
2017	Heather Rose	The Museum of Modern Love	Winner	
2017	Georgia Blain	Between a Wolf and a Dog	Shortlist	
2017	Maxine Beneba Clarke	The Hate Race	Shortlist	
2017	Catherine de Saint Phalle	Poum and Alexandre	Shortlist	
2017	Emily Maguire	An Isolated Incident	Shortlist	
2017	Cory Taylor	Dying: A Memoir	Shortlist	
2017	Julia Baird	Victoria: The Queen	Longlist	
2017	Madeline Gleeson	Offshore: Behind the Wire on Manus and Nauru	Longlist	
2017	Julia Leigh	Avalanche: A love story	Longlist	
2017	Fiona McFarlane	The High Places	Longlist	
2017	Elspeth Muir	Wasted: A story of alcohol, grief and a death in Brisbane	Longlist	
2017	Sonya Voumard	The Media and the Massacre: Port Arthur 1996-2016	Longlist	
2018	Alexis Wright	Tracker	Winner	
2018	Shokoofeh Azar	The Enlightenment of the Greengage Tree	Shortlist	
2018	Claire G. Coleman	Terra Nullius	Shortlist	
2018	Michelle de Kretser	The Life to Come	Shortlist	
2018	Krissy Kneen	An Uncertain Grace	Shortlist	
2018	Mirandi Riwoe	The Fish Girl	Shortlist	
2018	Bernadette Brennan	A Writing Life: Helen Garner and Her Work	Longlist	
2018	Kate Cole-Adams	Anaesthesia: The Gift of Oblivion and the Mystery of Consciousness	Longlist	
2018	Beverley Farmer	This Water: Five Tales	Longlist	
2018	Paula Keogh	The Green Bell: A Memoir of Love, Madness and Poetry	Longlist	
2018	Sofie Laguna	The Choke	Longlist	
2018	Joyce Morgan	Martin Sharp: His Life and Times	Longlist	
2019	Vicki Laveau-Harvie	The Erratics	Winner	
2019	Jenny Ackland	Little Gods	Shortlist	
2019	Enza Gandolfo	The Bridge	Shortlist	
2019	Jamie Marina Lau	Pink Mountain on Locust Island	Shortlist	
2019	Melissa Lucashenko	Too Much Lip	Shortlist	
2019	Maria Tumarkin	Axiomatic	Shortlist	
2019	Stephanie Bishop	Man out of Time	Longlist	
2019	Belinda Castles	Bluebottle	Longlist	
2019	Chloe Hooper	The Arsonist: A Mind on Fire	Longlist	
2019	Gail Jones	The Death of Noah Glass	Longlist	
2019	Bri Lee	Eggshell Skull	Longlist	
2019	Fiona Wright	The World Was Whole	Longlist	

=== 2020 to 2026 ===
Stella Prize winners, shortlists, and longlists
Year	Author	Title	Result	Ref.
2020	Jess Hill	See What You Made Me Do	Winner	
2020	Caro Llewellyn	Diving into Glass	Shortlist	
2020	Favel Parrett	There Was Still Love	Shortlist	
2020	Josephine Rowe	Here Until August	Shortlist	
2020	Tara June Winch	The Yield	Shortlist	
2020	Charlotte Wood	The Weekend	Shortlist	
2020	Joey Bui	Lucky Ticket	Longlist	
2020	Yumna Kassab	The House of Youssef	Longlist	
2020	Mandy Ord	When One Person Dies the Whole World is Over	Longlist	
2020	Vikki Wakefield	This is How We Change the Ending	Longlist	
2020	Sally Young	Paper Emperors	Longlist	
2020	Gay'wu Group of Women	Songspirals	Longlist	
2021	Evie Wyld	The Bass Rock	Winner	
2021	Rebecca Giggs	Fathoms: The World in the Whale	Shortlist	
2021	S. L. Lim	Revenge	Shortlist	
2021	Laura Jean McKay	The Animals in That Country	Shortlist	
2021	Louise Milligan	Witness	Shortlist	
2021	Mirandi Riwoe	Stone Sky Gold Mountain	Shortlist	
2021	Cath Moore	Metal Fish, Falling Snow	Longlist	
2021	Intan Paramaditha	The Wandering	Longlist	
2021	Ellena Savage	Blueberries	Longlist	
2021	Nardi Simpson	Song of the Crocodile	Longlist	
2021	Elizabeth Tan	Smart Ovens for Lonely People	Longlist	
2021	Jessie Tu	A Lonely Girl is a Dangerous Thing	Longlist	
2022	Evelyn Araluen	Dropbear	Winner	
2022	Eunice Andrada	Take Care	Shortlist	
2022	Anwen Crawford	No Document	Shortlist	
2022	Jennifer Down	Bodies of Light	Shortlist	
2022	Lee Lai	Stone Fruit	Shortlist	
2022	Elfie Shiosaki	Homecoming	Shortlist	
2022	Randa Abdel-Fattah	Coming of Age in the War on Terror	Longlist	
2022	Paige Clark	She Is Haunted	Longlist	
2022	Anita Heiss	Bila Yarrudhanggalangdhuray	Longlist	
2022	SJ Norman	Permafrost	Longlist	
2022	Lucy Van	The Open	Longlist	
2022	Chelsea Watego	Another Day in the Colony	Longlist	
2023	Sarah Holland-Batt	The Jaguar	Winner	
2023	Debra Dank	We Come With This Place	Shortlist	
2023	Eloise Grills	big beautiful female theory	Shortlist	
2023	Adriane Howell	Hydra	Shortlist	
2023	Louisa Lim	Indelible City	Shortlist	
2023	Edwina Preston	Bad Art Mother	Shortlist	
2023	Mandy Beaumont	The Furies	Longlist	
2023	Grace Chan	Every Version of You	Longlist	
2023	Jackie Huggins & Ngaire Jarro	Jack of Hearts: QX11594	Longlist	
2023	Tracey Lien	All That's Left Unsaid	Longlist	
2023	Fiona Kelly McGregor	Iris	Longlist	
2023	Thuy On	Decadence	Longlist	
2024	Alexis Wright	Praiseworthy	Winner	
2024	Katia Ariel	The Swift Dark Tide	Shortlist	
2024	Katherine Brabon	Body Friend	Shortlist	
2024	Emily O'Grady	Feast	Shortlist	
2024	Sanya Rushdi	Hospital	Shortlist	
2024	Hayley Singer	Abandon Every Hope	Shortlist	
2024	Stephanie Bishop	The Anniversary	Longlist	
2024	Ali Cobby Eckermann	She Is the Earth	Longlist	
2024	Melissa Lucashenko	Edenglassie	Longlist	
2024	Maggie MacKellar	Graft: Motherhood, family and a year on the land	Longlist	
2024	Kate Mildenhall	The Hummingbird Effect	Longlist	
2024	Laura Elizabeth Woollett	West Girls	Longlist	
2025	Michelle de Kretser	Theory & Practice	Winner	
2025	Jumaana Abdu	Translations	Shortlist	
2025	Melanie Cheng	The Burrow	Shortlist	
2025	Santilla Chingaipe	Black Convicts	Shortlist	
2025	Amy McQuire	Black Witness	Shortlist	
2025	Samah Sabawi	Cactus Pear for My Beloved	Shortlist	
2025	Manisha Anjali	Naag Mountain	Longlist	
2025	Dylin Hardcastle	A Language of Limbs	Longlist	
2025	Emily Maguire	Rapture	Longlist	
2025	Mykaela Saunders	Always Will Be	Longlist	
2025	Inga Simpson	The Thinning	Longlist	
2025	Cher Tan	Peripathetic	Longlist	
2026	Lee Lai	Cannon	Winner	
2026	Evelyn Araluen	The Rot	Shortlist	
2026	Geraldine Brooks	Memorial Days	Shortlist	
2026	Miranda Darling	Fireweather	Shortlist	
2026	Marika Sosnowski	58 Facets: On Violence and the Law	Shortlist	
2026	Tasma Walton	I Am Nannertgarrook	Shortlist	
2026	Eunice Andrada	KONTRA	Longlist	
2026	Debra Dank	Ankami	Longlist	
2026	Natalie Harkin	Apron-Sorrow / Sovereign-Tea	Longlist	
2026	Charlotte McConaghy	Wild Dark Shore	Longlist	
2026	Lucy Nelson	Wait Here	Longlist	
2026	Micaela Sahhar	Find Me at the Jaffa Gate: An Encyclopaedia of a Palestinian family	Longlist	

== See also ==
- List of literary awards honoring women
- Sophie Cunningham
