= Caro Llewellyn =

Australian executive, festival director and author

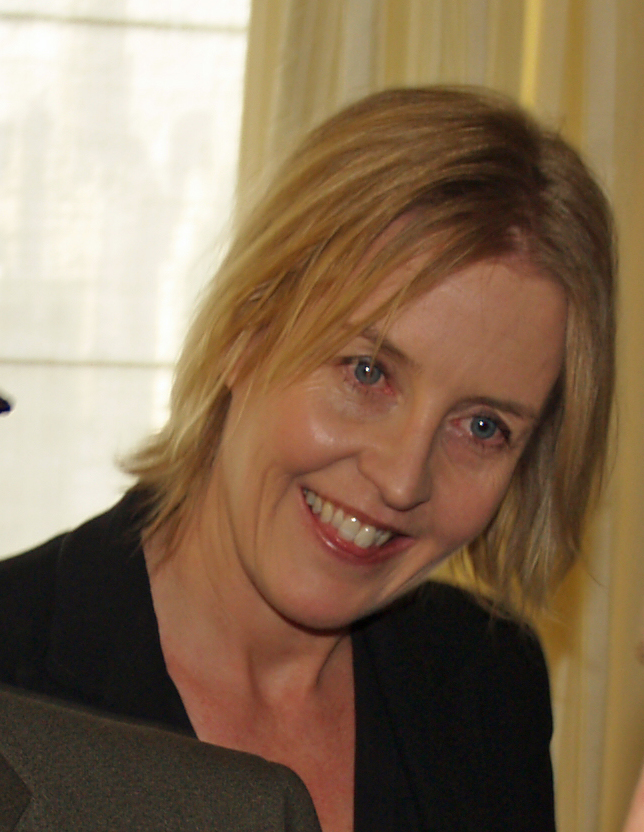
- Llewellyn in 2008
- Occupations: Business executive, artistic director, festival manager and nonfiction writer
- Known for: Literary festivals
- Notable work: Diving into Glass

Caro Llewellyn (born 1965) is an Australian business executive, artistic director, festival manager and nonfiction writer. From 2020 to July 2023, she was chief executive officer of the Wheeler Centre in Melbourne.

== Career ==
Llewellyn is the daughter of Richard Llewellyn and poet Kate Llewellyn. She grew up in Adelaide.

Early in her career Llewellyn had a job booking bands for venues. She entered the literary world and became product manager for Random House. From 2002 to 2006 Llewellyn was director of the Sydney Writers' Festival. In 2006 she moved to New York where she was employed by Salman Rushdie to manage the PEN World Voices Festival from 2007. She was diagnosed with multiple sclerosis in 2009 and found she was no longer able to read. At the time she had been appointed inaugural director of what later became the Wheeler Centre but resigned before she began the role. After about three years she discovered that her sight had improved and she was able to read novels again.

For Columbia University, she served as artistic director of the Paris-based Festival des Écrivains du Monde from 2012 to 2015. During this period, from 2013 to 2015, she ran the New Literature from Europe Festival in New York. Back in Australia in 2017, Llewellyn was appointed Director of Experience and Engagement at Museums Victoria.

In 2020 Llewellyn was appointed chief executive officer of the Wheeler Centre, taking over for Michael Williams, who had maintained a decade-long post there. She vacated the role in July 2023 when her contract expired, and the centre hired Eric Vincent.

== Memoir ==
"Diving into Glass is a deeply moving journey across family, love, art, literature and loss. Lit throughout with brilliant prose, this book reveals a family on the brink. Set against the backdrop of mental illness and childhood trauma, it is also the journey of the hard-fought victories that signalled changes in legislation surrounding the conditions of people with disabilities.

Llewellyn shows she has total control of the prose as she eloquently reveals the life she watched her father live – paralysed and in a wheelchair for most of his adult life as a result of polio – is something she herself may face after a diagnosis of MS.

The author takes us into the dark places of mental illness as well as the beauty of her mother’s, Kate Llewellyn, poetry. Diving into Glass is a brilliantly constructed story that is at once gripping and tender – shot through with love and empathy for the author’s family. "

— 2020 Stella Prize Judges

Her 2019 memoir, Diving into Glass, details both her and Richard's handicaps, and how his way of living through polio since the age of 20 influenced her own method of managing her condition. The book is primarily a biography about Richard and the relationship he had with his children and wives, plus it mentions his work in improving accessibility to those who are disabled; it also covers her career, and the later chapters finally discuss her tribulations with MS. The memoir/biography received considerable attention from other disabled professionals, drawing both positive remarks and critical analysis. Astrid Edwards, a writing professor at RMIT, in the April 2019, no. 410 issue of Australian Book Review, discussed how she also has MS and "approached [this biography] with excitement and... a certain cynicism," as she looked to glean insight into her condition, or "find someone that has had symptoms like [hers]." She was disappointed that MS was not discussed very much until the end of the book; "it is more of a biography than a memoir. The majority of the work is devoted to Richard's life and the impact he had on his daughter. While it's marketed as a memoir of [her] experience with MS, in reality it's a reflection of growing up along with her father's severe disability." However, she did find Caro Llyewellyn's recounting of her "impressive" career to be "world-class tales" and viewed the reflection on stigma and discrimination of "citizens of sickness", and society's evolving treatment of these things, notable.

It was shortlisted for the 2020 Stella Prize. The panel believed that it not only reflected a "deeply moving" personal story, it also related to societal movements in the special interests of those with disability, including growing inclusivity and more effective legislation. They also complimented her mastery of language, calling it "total control of the prose;" and said that the memoir constituted a "brilliantly constructed story."

== Personal life ==
Between 2007 and 2009, Llewellyn worked at PEN World Voices. While running in Central Park in New York, her legs experienced numbness and lost all sensation; she was soon diagnosed with multiple sclerosis, a disease of the nervous system that can impair eyesight. As someone who needed to read in order to organize book-related functions, this affected her career and life profoundly and inspired Diving into Glass.

Her family had experience with disability beforehand, as her father, Richard, suffered from polio, which causes permanent loss of movement in the extremities; despite and because of this, he became disability advisor to South Australian Premier John Bannon.

== Bibliography ==
- Llewellyn, Caro; Rogers, Skye (1995). Jobs for the Girls: Women Talk About Running a Business. Random House Australia. ISBN 9780091830960.
- Llewellyn, Caro (1996). Fresh Market People and Their Food. Random House. ISBN 9780091832643.
- Llewellyn, Caro (2019). Diving into Glass. Hamish Hamilton, an imprint of Penguin Books. ISBN 9780143793786.

=== As editor ===
- Llewellyn, Caro, ed. (1999). My One True Love. Random House Australia. ISBN 9780091837044.
