= The Age Short Story Award =

International award for short, unpublished stories

- Country: Australia
- Formerly called: The Age-Tabloid Story Awards
- First award: 1979

The Age Short Story Award is a competition that is run in conjunction with International PEN, the international writers' association. It was established in 1979. From 1979 to 1984 it was run in conjunction with Tabloid Story and was known as The Age-Tabloid Story Awards. The inaugural award was won by Harris Smart. Entries must be unpublished, and under 3000 words. Three prizes are awarded and the winning stories are published in The Age and online.

== Winners ==
Year (Note: There is often confusion in reporting the awards as the award is sometimes announced around December and sometimes around January. Consequently, some sources give the year as the year the competition closed, and some as the year the award was announced. This may account for any apparent discrepancies in the list given below. There is no official listing from The Age to clarify the situation.)	1st Prize	2nd Prize	3rd Prize
1979	by Harris Smart		
1983	by Connie Gregory		
1987	"Tennis with My Father" by Richard Lunn	"Purring Our Way to the Tropics" by Tony Lintermans	"Like the Tail of a Comet'" by Jane Hyde
1988	"The Wage Earner" by Lin Van Hek	"Little Electric Wheelchair" by Michael Stephens	"Thanks for the Currawongs" by Max Painter
1989	"What Would Sasha Say" by Tony Lintermans	"Where the Wild Geese Go" by Joan Birchall	"Blue Milk" by Gillian Mears
1990	"The Road Up and the Road Down" by Margaret Betts	"Hidden Glass" by Sydney Smith	"Cat in Deep Water" by Josephine Barnes
1991	"Aunt Jessica and the Ostrich-tamer" by Stephanie Green; co-winner, by Margaret Betts	"Photographs from Beneath the Surface" by Judith Duffy	"Imperial Zoo" by David Astle
1992	The Green Light by Danny Calegari; co-winner "The Pleasures of Eczema" by Tony Lintermans		by Michael McGirr
1993	"The Mummy's Foot" by Beth Spencer	"Winter in Berlin" by Barry Homewood	"The Wide Circle" by Darren Hill
1994	"The Reasons I Won't Be Coming" by Elliot Perlman	by Norman Bilbrough	by Tim Richards
1995	"Reply to a Letter" by Wayne Macauley	"The King And I" by Raymond Allan	"The Bands on my Teeth" by Michael McGirr
1996	by Sue Martin	by Kevin Brophy	by Jane Watson
1997	"Dumb Things I Gotta Do" by James Hawthorne	"The Vision" by Ruth Learner	"The Letter" by Samantha Hanna
1998	"Sodasi" by Keith Butler	by Michael McGirr	by Margaret Betts
1999	by Michelle de Kretser	by Angus Ibbott	by Katheryn Lomer
2000	by Cate Kennedy	by Craig Cormick	by Michelle Vlatkovic
2001	What Thou and I Did, till We Loved by Cate Kennedy	Warhead' by Emma Ashmere (published under Emma Hartwood)	by Jen Alexander
2002	"Snapshot of Strangers" by Paddy O'Reilly	"Silver Apples" by Andrea Mayes	"The Greatest Thing in all Movies" by Patrick Holland
2003	"The Caribou Herd" by Miles Hitchcock	"The Wheelbarrow" by Patrick Cullen	
2004	"All Fathers the Father" by Emmett Stinson	"Just a Line" by Ross Gray	"Hotel Sheesh Mahal" by Liz Gallois
2005	"The Reasons for Us Being Here" by Ellen Rodger	"Booligal Sheep Station" by Dennis McIntosh	"The Promise" by Erin Gough
2006	"From the Wreck" by Rob Williams	"Remaking the Image of this World" by Shane Jesse Christmass	"Suckered into a Perfect Line" by Bill Collopy
2007	"A Parachute Landing in Siberia" by Stephen McGrath	"The Feeder" by Glenys Osborne	"The Heron" by Alison Campbell Rate
2008	"Home Visit" by Peggy Frew	"A House Was Built Around You While You Slept" by Glenys Osborne	"Frozen Cigarettes" by Bronwyn Mehan
2009	"Flat Daddy" by Louise D'Arcy	"Can't Take the Country Out of the Boy" by Joanne Riccioni	"The Chinese Lesson" by Ryan O'Neill
2010	"The Fields of Early Sorrow" by Murray Middleton	"The Devil's Music" by Carol Middleton	"A Ticket to Switzerland" by Jennifer Down
2012	"Crumbs" by Bram Presser	"Meatloaf in Manhattan" by Robert Power	"The Yellow Chair" by Stephen McGrath
2013	"Maggot" by Michelle Wright	"Three Encounters with the Physical" by Graeme Simsion	"Hunting Animals" by Ruby Murray
