= Hospital (Rushdi novel) =

2023 book by Sanya Rushdi

- Author: Sanya Rushdi
- Translator: Arunava Sinha
- Genre: Autofiction
- Publisher: Giramondo Publishing
- Publication date: June 2023
- Publication place: Australia
- Pages: 128
- ISBN: 9781922725455

Hospital is a novel by Sanya Rushdi. Originally published in Bengali in 2019, it was translated into English by Arunava Sinha and published in Australia by Giramondo Publishing in 2023. The book is a work of autofiction that describes Rushdi's experiences of schizophrenia. It was shortlisted for the 2024 Miles Franklin Literary Award and the 2024 Stella Prize.

== About the author ==
The Bangladeshi author, Sanya Rushdi, was born in 1977. She was the second born of three children. She completed part of her primary school years in Dhaka, Bangladesh, which was interrupted by her family's move to Australia. This is where she finished the rest of her primary school education along with her secondary and tertiary education. She also went to college in Australia where she studied psychology. However, soon after settling into her PhD program at Deakin University she fell into her first episode of psychosis. After her first episode, she developed post-psychotic depression which she claims was more debilitating than the psychosis. Some time during her deep depression, she fell into her second episode of psychosis, then eventually her third where she was then diagnosed with schizophrenia. After her third episode, as she was recovering from her depression and learning how to cope with the symptoms of her schizophrenia, she started writing her novel Hospital.

== Writing and publication history ==
Hospital is based on Sanya Rushdi's own experiences of psychosis, which began with an initial episode in 2009. She began the process of writing her story two months after she was released from hospital following a third episode of psychosis in 2015. She knew her struggle with psychosis was a story worth telling, but she didn't know the best way to go about it. This is when Rushdi decided to go to her friend, Bratya Raisu, for assistance. He looked over her writing and suggested she turn her story into a novel.

The novel was originally published in 2019 in Bengali by Bohiprokash. Later, it was translated into English by Arunava Sinha, who is well known for translating books from Bengali into English. The English version was then published in Australia by Giramondo Publishing in June 2023 (ISBN 978-1-922725-45-5).

Arunava Sinha claims that Rushdi's writing was so beautifully articulated that the translation process was extremely easy because all she had to do was closely follow the words.

== Summary ==
The book is in the perspective of Sanya Rushdi, who is a Bangladeshi woman living in Australia. It follows her journey from the time before her third episode of psychosis to after she is released from the psychiatric hospital that she was admitted to against her will. The story starts off with the reappearance of her symptoms, which worries her family a lot. They called the doctors to check her well-being a couple times and eventually she was sent to the psychiatric ward after fleeing a hospital. She is diagnosed with schizophrenia and is placed into a strict observation room. Days in the hospital are very repetitive and controlled by the nurses. As Sanya spends more time there, she emphasizes the lack of control she has over her own life and decisions, especially when it comes to medication and injections. She also points out how time is a bit confusing in the hospital because of the strict schedules she's forced to abide by. She starts interacting more with other patients and as her symptoms begin to stabilize she's moved into a ward that is less restrictive. Things that would usually cause her fear and trigger the symptoms of her psychosis start to have less meaning to her and eventually the doctors deem her stable enough to be released from the hospital. Some time after being released from the hospital she meets a boy who becomes her boyfriend and he helps her a lot with her recovery journey.

== Reception ==
The novel received generally positive reviews. Sonya Nair wrote in Meanjin that the book "pushes back against the systematic dehumanisation of the mentally ill" and that Rushdi "successfully plays with, and in the process, ruptures societal definitions of what constitutes a mental illness". In ABC News, Cher Tan wrote that the book was "a provocation" that questions the psychiatric system and the institutionalisation of the mentally ill.

Reviewers also praised the quality of Rushdi's writing and of Sinha's translation. Julianne Lamond wrote in The Conversation that the book was "written in an understated tone that does not sensationalise the experiences it portrays". In the Asian Review of Books, Areeb Ahmad wrote that "even without linguistic pyrotechnics, Hospital is very affecting in how it explores madness and sanity". In Westerly, Ellie Fisher reserved particular praise for Sinha's translation, writing that "his translation, combined with the strength of her prose, delivers a novel-in-translation which is both translucent and incisive". A review in The Daily Star wrote that Sinha's translation left "a potent silhouette of the original behind an English version that masterfully stands on its own".

== Awards ==
Awards for Hospital
Year	Award	Category	Result	Ref.
2024	Stella Prize	—	Shortlisted	
2024	Miles Franklin Literary Award	—	Shortlisted	
2024	Voss Literary Prize	—	Shortlisted	
