= Dark Roots =

- Author: Cate Kennedy
- Language: English
- Published: 2006
- Publisher: Scribe
- Publication place: Australia
- Pages: 182
- ISBN: 978-1-922-07019-7
- OCLC: 801840206
- Dewey Decimal: 823.0108994

Dark Roots is a collection of short fiction by Cate Kennedy. It was first published in Australia by Scribe in 2006. Cold Snap appeared in The New Yorker under the title Black Ice. What Thou and I Did, till We Loved won The Age Short Story Award in 2001.

== Contents ==
Dark Roots contains the following short stories:

1. "What Thou and I Did, Till We Loved"
2. "A Pitch Too High for the Human Ear"
3. "Habit"
4. "Flotsam"
5. "Cold Snap"
6. "Resize"
7. "The Testosterone Club"
8. "Dark Roots"
9. "Angel"
10. "Seizure"
11. "The Light of Coincidence"
12. "Soundtrack"
13. "Direct Action"
14. "The Correct Names of Things"
15. "Wheelbarrow Thief"
16. "Sea Burial"
17. "Kill or Cure"

== Reception ==
The New York Times reviewed the collection, calling Kennedy's stories "melancholy but deliberate and coolly exact". The Herald Scotland also reviewed Dark Roots, writing that there was "much to admire in Cate Kennedy's debut collection of short stories, Dark Roots; most of all the fact that nearly all of the stories have won major competitions."
