= Kris Kneen =

Australian author

Krissy Kneen
- Born: 1968 (age 57–58)
- Occupation: Author
- Website: www.krissykneen.com

Kris Kneen (formerly Krissy Kneen) is a Brisbane-based writer. Kneen has been shortlisted four times for the Queensland Premier's Literary Award.

== Career ==
Kneen has written two collections of erotica—Swallow the Sound (2007) and Triptych (2011)—as well as four novels. They're also the author of three memoirs. Affection (2009) deals with their childhood and young adulthood through the lens of sexuality, The Three Burials of Lotty Kneen (2021) is principally about their grandmother, and Fat Girl Dancing (2023) concerns their relationship with their body. Their sole poetry collection, Eating my Grandmother (2015), won the Thomas Shapcott Poetry Prize.

They appeared in four events at the 2017 Brisbane Writers Festival.

== Style and critical reception ==
Kneen's work has been described as "transgressive, sardonic, lyrical, comic; irresistibly erotic yet also romantic" and "acclaimed for its fearless honesty".

== Awards and nominations ==
- 2010: Australian Book Industry Awards, Shortlist: Affection
- 2005: Queensland Premier's Literary Awards: Emerging Manuscript, Shortlist: His Father's Son
- 2007: Queensland Premier's Literary Awards: Emerging Queensland Author Manuscript Award, Shortlist: Paper Dolls, Holding Hands
- 2010: Queensland Premier's Literary Awards: Non-Fiction Book Award, Shortlist: Affection
- 2018: Stella Prize, Shortlist: An Uncertain Grace.
- 2014: Thomas Shapcott Poetry Prize, Winner: Eating My Grandmother: A Grief Cycle
- 2019: Queensland Literary Awards: Queensland Premier's Award for a work of State Significance, Shortlist: Wintering
- 2024: Victorian Premier's Prize for Nonfiction, Shortlist: Fat Girl Dancing

== Personal life ==
In 2009 Kneen moved to New Farm, Brisbane with their husband.

Their grandmother was born in Egypt to a Slovenian mother and a father who had lived in Egypt for at least three generations and whose mother was Syrian, and most likely Jewish.

== Published works ==
=== Novels ===
- Swallow the Sound, Eatbooks, 2007, ISBN 9780980323207
- Triptych, An Erotic Adventure: 3 Stories in 1, Text Publishing, 2011, ISBN 9781921758706
- Steeplechase, Text Publishing, 2013, ISBN 9781922079879
- The Adventures of Holly White and the Incredible Sex Machine, Text Publishing, 2015, ISBN 9781922079381
- An Uncertain Grace, Text Publishing, 2017, ISBN 9781925355987
- Wintering, Text Publishing, 2018, ISBN 9781925603880
- Rite of Spring, Transit Lounge, 2026, ISBN 9781923023581

=== Memoirs ===
- Affection: A Memoir of Love, Sex & Intimacy, Text Publishing, 2009, ISBN 9781921656729
- The Three Burials of Lotty Kneen: Travels with My Grandmother's Ashes, Text Publishing, 2021, ISBN 9781922330161
- Fat Girl Dancing, Text Publishing, 2023, ISBN 9781922790217

=== Poetry ===
- Eating My Grandmother: A Grief Cycle, University of Queensland Press, 2015, ISBN 9780702253744

=== Contributed chapter ===
- "The university and the beast: a fairy tale", pp. 263–276, in: Destroying the Joint, edited by Jane Caro, Read How You Want, 2015, ISBN 9781459687295
