= Life Could Be a Dream (film) =

2026 Australian film

- Directed by: Jasmin Tarasin
- Screenplay by: Courtney Collins
- Produced by: Jasmin Tarasin, co-produced by Clare Lewis and Catherine Church
- Starring: Maeve Dermody; Alexander England
- Cinematography: Meg White
- Edited by: Gabriella Muir
- Music by: Dan Luscombe
- Production companies: GoodChat; Pure Pictures
- Distributed by: Maslow Entertainment
- Release date: 2026
- Running time: 82 min.
- Country: Australia
- Language: English

Life Could Be a Dream is an Australian drama film directed by Jasmin Tarasin, with a screenplay by Courtney Collins. Starring Maeve Dermody and Alexander England, the film's storyline is centred around coercive control.

== Synopsis ==
Real estate agent Sarah, aged 40, escapes a coercive, controlling marriage to Jake with her teenage son Otis, taking refuge in a mansion Sarah has been hired to sell, pretending to be on an overseas holiday. There are flashbacks to the marriage, and a separate strand showing Jake's current movements. Sarah and Otis face various challenges as they navigate life in the mansion. Otis flirts with the local grocery store owner's daughter Sati.

== Cast ==
- Maeve Dermody as Sarah
- Alexander England as Jake
- Sonny McGee as Otis
- Noam Sen-Gupta as Sati
- Septimus Caton as The Gardener

== Production ==
The screenplay of the film was written by author Courtney Collins, while it is directed by Jasmin Lee Tarasin, in her feature film directorial debut. Tarasin is known for her ABC TV documentary Utopia Girls, which was a finalist at the 2012 AACTA Awards and the NSW Premier's History Awards. She also directed the award-winning documentary series commissioned by SBS Television, The Closet Tales, a four-part documentary about prominent Australian fashion designers, screened in 2006.

Meg White, an Australian cinematographer base in the US, was responsible for filming. The casting director was Anousha Zarkesh.

Life Could Be a Dream was produced by Tarasin, and co-produced by Clare Lewis and Catherine Church through GoodChat, along with Pure Pictures, and supported by the Minderoo and Snow Foundations.

The score was created by Australian composer and musician Dan Luscombe, along with original tracks by Polish pianist Hania Rani and Australian musical duo Time for Dreams, consisting of Tom Carlyon and Amanda Roff.

The house used for Jake and Sarah's family home was that of Carla Zampatti, a friend of the director. She said that the extensive glass in the house acted as a metaphor, as a glass cage for Sarah. Sonny McGee, who plays Otis, is Tarasin's real-life son.

== Release ==
Life Could Be a Dream was selected for screening at the Montreal Independent Film Festival in 2025.

After a preview screening in Melbourne on 14 April 2026, followed by a Q&A session, the film was released in Australian cinemas on 14 May 2026, distributed by Maslow Entertainment.

== Reception ==
Luke Buckmaster of The Guardian gave the film 4 out of 5 stars, calling it "a powerful, memorable film" and praising the direction, cinematography, and performances. Stephen A. Russell, writing in Screenhub, also gave it 4 out of 5 stars, calling it a "genuinely gut-wrenching Australian drama" and also praising the direction and performances. Both Buckmaster and Russell draw comparisons with the 2023 film Shayda.

== Accolades ==
Tarasin won the award for Best Female Director at the Montreal Independent Film Festival in 2025.
