= Emily Bitto =

Australian writer

Emily Bitto is an Australian writer. Her debut novel, The Strays, won the 2015 Stella Prize for Australian women's writing. This was followed in 2021 by Wild Abandon.

== Biography ==
Bitto was shortlisted for the Prize for an Unpublished Manuscript for an emerging Victorian Writer at the 2013 Victorian Premier's Literary Awards, for the manuscript of her debut novel, The Strays. The novel was subsequently published by Affirm Press in March 2014.

The Strays is a fictionalisation of the 1930s group of Australian artists known as the Heide Circle. Bitto has said that she "tried to capture (...) the romance and excitement of that circle; the sense of the new that stirred the stale waters of outer Melbourne when a group of artists came together to work and live side by side, to buck the establishment and create their own small utopia within the confines of an old house and a large, thriving garden."

The Age described it as "an eloquent portrayal of the damage caused by self-absorption as well as a moving study of isolation". It was awarded the A$50,000 Stella Prize for the best book of fiction or nonfiction by an Australian woman. The Stella Prize judges described The Strays as "like a gemstone: polished and multifaceted, reflecting illuminations back to the reader and holding rich colour in its depths."

The Strays has been published in the UK (Legend Press), U.S. (Twelve Books) and Canada (Penguin). It was a New York Times Book Review editor's pick, and received favourable reviews from NPR and The New Yorker.

Bitto attended the University of Melbourne where she earned a masters in literary studies and a PhD in creative writing. She lives in Melbourne, where she co-owns and runs the Carlton wine-bar Heartattack and Vine, which she opened with her partner and two friends in late 2014.

== Award and honours ==
Year	Title	Award	Category	Result	Ref.
2013	The Strays	Victorian Premier's Literary Awards	Prize for an Unpublished Manuscript by an Emerging Victorian Writer	Shortlisted	
2015	The Strays	Indie Book Awards	Debut Fiction	Shortlisted	
2015	The Strays	New South Wales Premier's Literary Awards	Glenda Adams Award for New Writing	Shortlisted	
2015	The Strays	Nita Kibble Literary Awards	Dobbie Award	Shortlisted	
2015	The Strays	Stella Prize	—	Won	
2016	The Strays	International Dublin Literary Award	—	Longlisted	
2022	Wild Abandon	ALS Gold Medal	—	Shortlisted	
2022	Wild Abandon	Colin Roderick Award	—	Won	
2023	—	Blake-Beckett Trust Scholarship	—	Shortlisted	

== Bibliography ==
- The Strays (2014)
- Wild Abandon (2021)
