= Like a House on Fire (short story collection) =

2012 short story collection by Cate Kennedy

- Author: Cate Kennedy
- Genre: Fiction
- Publisher: Scribe
- Publication date: 26 September 2012
- Publication place: Australia
- Pages: 288
- Awards: Steele Rudd Award
- ISBN: 9781922070067

Like a House on Fire is a 2012 collection of fifteen short stories by Australian author Cate Kennedy. The collection was the winner of the 2013 Steele Rudd Award at the Queensland Literary Awards and was shortlisted for the Nita Kibble Literary Award and the Stella Prize.

== Reception ==
Like a House on Fire received positive reviews. In a review in Australian Book Review, Anthony Lynch praised the realism of Kennedy's stories and wrote that her "subtle, insightful renderings of character achieve great poignancy". In the New Zealand Herald, John McCrystal wrote that the collection was "short fiction at its best". Meg Whelan gave the collection 4 out of 5 stars in a review for Books+Publishing magazine, describing it as a "heartfelt and moving collection" and praising Kennedy's "evocative prose". Reviewers praised the stories Seventy-two Derwents, told from the perspective of a child witnessing her mother's abusive relationship, and Laminex and Mirrors, a story about a hospital cleaner who helps an elderly patient to defy the hospital's rules.

== Awards ==
Awards for Like a House on Fire
Year	Award	Category	Result	Ref.
2013	Queensland Literary Awards	Steele Rudd Award	Won	
2013	Stella Prize	—	Shortlisted	
2013	Nita Kibble Literary Awards	—	Shortlisted	
2013	ALS Gold Medal	—	Longlisted	
