= Anwen Crawford =

Australian writer

- Writing career
- Notable work: No Document
- Notable awards: Pascall Prize

Anwen Crawford is an Australian writer and music critic. She is the former music critic for The Monthly and has authored two non-fiction books: No Document (2021) and Live Through This (2015). She won the Pascall Prize for Arts Criticism in 2021, and was shortlisted for the 2022 Stella Prize.

== Career ==
Anwen Crawford was the music critic for The Monthly between 2013 and 2021. Her first book, an analysis of the Hole album Live Through This, was released by Bloomsbury Publishing in 2015. Crawford received a New South Wales Writers' Fellowship in 2016 and was the new writer in residence at the University of Technology Sydney between 2017 and 2018. Her second book, No Document, is a work of creative nonfiction about the death of a friend. It was published by Giramondo Publishing in 2021 and was shortlisted for the 2022 Stella Prize. That year, Crawford also won the Pascall Prize for her music criticism.

== Works ==
- Live Through This (Bloomsbury Publishing, 2015) ISBN 9781623563776
- No Document (Giramondo Publishing, 2021) ISBN 9781925818611
