= The Burial (novel) =

2012 novel by Courtney Collins

- Author: Courtney Collins
- Genre: Fiction
- Publisher: Allen & Unwin
- Publication date: 2012
- Publication place: Australia
- Pages: 296
- ISBN: 9781743311875

The Burial is a 2012 novel by Australian author Courtney Collins. The book, which was Collins' debut novel, is the story of an early 20th-century female bushranger whose story was based on that of Jessie Hickman. The novel was shortlisted for the 2013 Stella Prize.

== Reception ==
The Burial received positive reviews. In The Sydney Morning Herald, Felicity Plunkett wrote that the book was an effective work of historical fiction that layered stories and perspectives. In Australian Book Review, Gillian Dooley wrote that Collins' decision to narrate the story from the perspective of Jessie's murdered baby was "preposterous", but that it worked superbly. She concluded that the novel was "finely written, with a lovely ear for the cadences of language, but it also has an urgent narrative drive, along with a strong awareness of place, compelling characters, and a whiff of magic realism to enliven the mixture." In The Newtown Review of Books, Annette Hughes wrote that the book had a "brilliant liberating conclusion" and that its language and structure were polished and well-executed.

== Awards ==
Awards for The Burial
Year	Award	Category	Result	Ref.
2013	Stella Prize	—	Shortlisted	
2013	New South Wales Premier's Literary Awards	Glenda Adams Award for New Writing	Shortlisted	
2013	Nita Kibble Literary Awards	Dobbie Literary Award	Shortlisted	
