= Fiona Wright =

Australian poet and critic (born 1983)

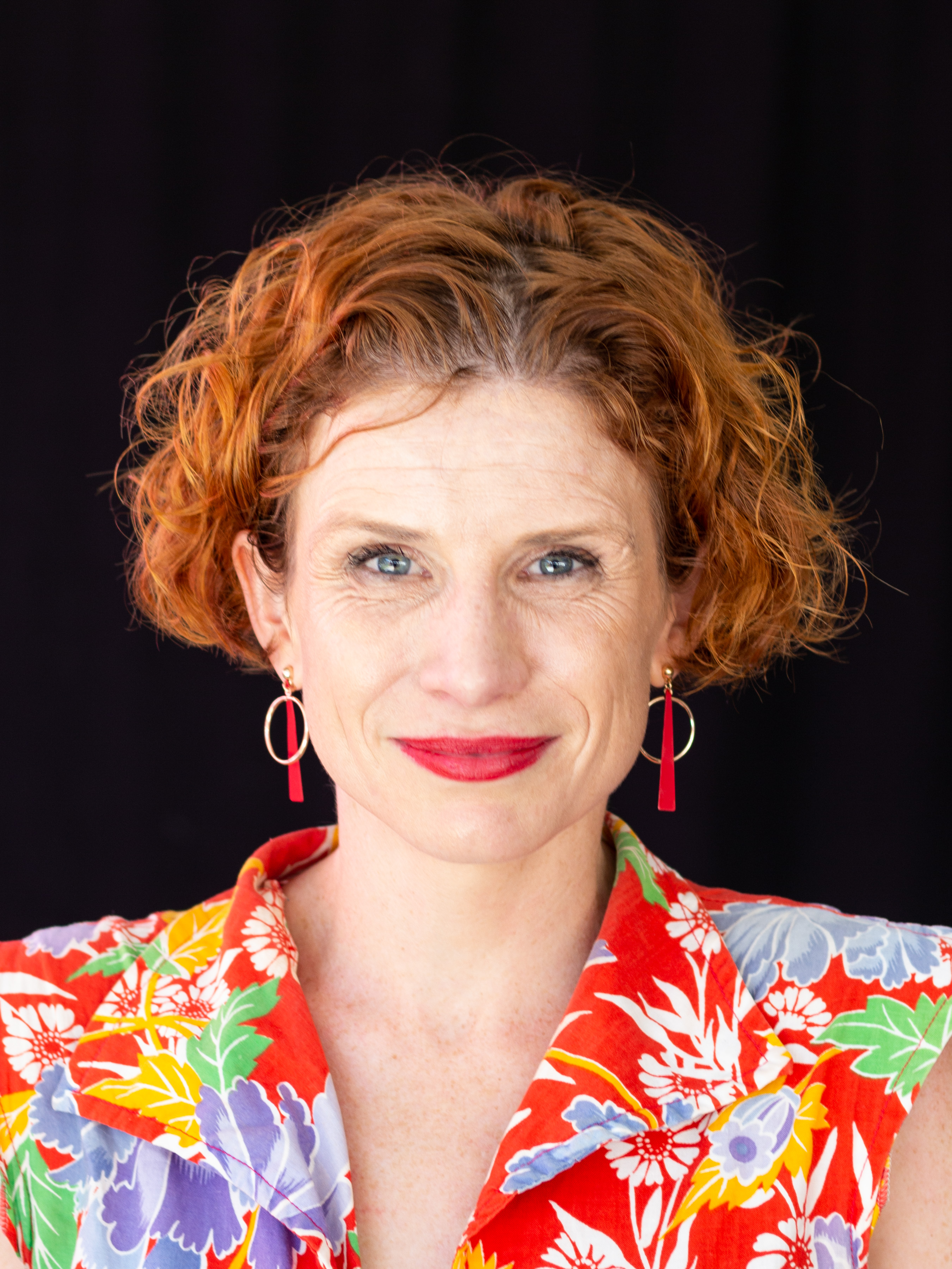
- Wright at Perth Festival Writers Week in 2019
- Born: 1983 (age 42–43)
- Occupations: Poet, critic

Fiona Wright (born 1983) is an Australian poet and critic.

== Life and career ==
Fiona Wright grew up in Menai, New South Wales. Wright has completed residencies including an Island of Residencies placement at the Tasmanian Writers' Centre in 2007. She received an Emerging Writers' Grant by the Literature Board of the Australia Council in 2010.

Wright's debut collection of poetry, Knuckled (2011) was awarded the Dame Mary Gilmore Award in 2012.

Her book Small Acts of Disappearance: Essays in Hunger (2015) is a collection of ten essays that detail the author's own experience with anorexia. Small Acts of Disappearance won the 2016 Kibble Award, which recognises life writing by women writers, and the 2016 University of Queensland Non-Fiction Book Award in the Queensland Literary Awards. It was also shortlisted for both the 2016 Stella Prize and the 2016 NSW Premier's Literary Awards for non-fiction.

She completed a PhD at the Western Sydney University, Writing and Society Research Centre in 2016.

Her poems featured in the Black Inc. annual anthology of Best Australian Poems in 2015 and 2016. Wright is the 2017 Copyright Agency (CAL) New Writer in Residence at University of Technology Sydney. Wright's essay, State Your Intentions, was shortlisted for the 2018 Horne Prize.

== Works ==
=== Poetry ===
- Knuckled Giramondo Publishing, 2011. ISBN 978-1-920882-75-4
- Domestic Interior Giramondo Publishing, 2017. ISBN 978-1-925336-56-6

Her poetry has also been published in the Age, the Australian’s Literary Review, Black Inc's Best Australian Poetry and in journals and anthologies in Australia, Asia and the USA.

=== Essay collections ===
- Small Acts of Disappearance: Essays in Hunger Giramondo Publishing, 2015. ISBN 978-1-922146-93-9
- The World Was Whole Giramondo Publishing, 2018. ISBN 978-1-925336-97-9

=== Novels ===
- Kill Your Boomers Hardie Grant, 2026. ISBN 978-1761154256
