= Julienne van Loon =

Australian author and academic (born 1970)

Julienne van Loon (born 1970) is an Australian author and academic.

In 2004, van Loon won The Australian/Vogel Literary Award for her first book, Road Story.

Van Loon lived in Perth, where she served as a senior lecturer in the Department of Communication and Cultural Studies at Curtin University from 1997 to 2015. In September 2015 she was appointed Vice Chancellor's Principal Research Fellow at RMIT University. She also served as the director of the Australian Society of Authors from 2015 to 2017. She is currently Associate Professor of Creative Writing at the University of Melbourne.

Her first non-fiction book, The Thinking Woman, was developed from conversations she had with seven feminist thinkers (Laura Kipnis, Siri Hustvedt, Nancy Holmstrom, Helen Caldicott, Julia Kristeva, Marina Warner and Rosi Braidotti) and covers six themes (love, work, play, fear, wonder and friendship).

== Works ==
=== Novels ===
- Road Story (2005, Allen & Unwin)
- Beneath the Bloodwood Tree (2008, Allen & Unwin)
- Harmless (2013, Fremantle Press)

=== Non-fiction ===
- The Thinking Woman (2019, NewSouth Publishing)
