= Jamie Marina Lau =

Australian novelist

- Born: 1996 or 1997 (age 28–29)
- Occupation: Writer
- Writing career
- Notable works: Gunk Baby; Pink Mountain on Locust Island

Jamie Marina Lau is an Australian writer. She has written two novels: Gunk Baby and Pink Mountain on Locust Island. Her first novel, Pink Mountain on Locust Island, was shortlisted for the Stella Prize and the ALS Gold Medal.

== Career ==
Lau's first novel, Pink Mountain on Locust Island, was published by Brow Books in Australia in 2018 and by Coffee House Press in the United States in 2020. The novel follows a 15-year-old girl named Monk living in Chinatown of an unnamed city with her father. Monk meets a 19-year-old art student named Santa Coy who is involved in the criminal underworld. In a review in The Australian, Thuy On wrote that the novel was "patchy", praising its experimental prose and structure but noting that parts of the novel lacked substance. A review in Kirkus Reviews concurred, describing the novel as "hypnotizing and inscrutable" while noting that the prose was occasionally so dense that its meaning became obscured. A review in Publishers Weekly praised the novel's "fragmented noir aesthetic" and described the work as a perceptive debut. The book was shortlisted for the Stella Prize and the ALS Gold Medal.

Lau's second novel, Gunk Baby, was published in Australia by Hachette Australia in 2021 and in the United States by Astra House in 2022. The novel is about a woman named Leen who runs a massage and ear-cleaning business at a suburban mall. The novel received a positive review from Declan Fry in The Guardian, where he compared Lau's writing to that of Michael Bible and Yoko Ogawa and described the novel as "a portrait of post-industrial alienation". In The New York Times, Alexandra Turner praised Lau's prose and her exploration of consumerism and Orientalism. The novel received a negative review in Publishers Weekly, which criticised the novel's "slow pacing and underdeveloped supporting characters". In Kirkus Reviews, a review described the novel as "funny, bold, capacious, and more than a little exhausting", while noting that its "hyperconscious maximalism" overwhelmed the reader at times. A review in The Saturday Paper praised Lau's characterisation and her ability to build up a "laconic tension" in her writing.

Outside of her writing, Lau produces music under the pseudonym "ZK King".

== Notable works ==
- Pink Mountain on Locust Island (Brow Books, 2018) ISBN 978-0-9946068-8-4
- Gunk Baby (Hachette Australia, 2021) ISBN 978-0-7336-4627-0
