= The Lifted Brow =

Australian literary organisation and magazine

- Editors: Justin Wolfers, Jini Maxwell
- Categories: Literary magazines
- Frequency: Quarterly
- Publisher: Sam Cooney
- Founded: 2007
- Country: Australia
- Based in: Melbourne
- Language: English
- Website: theliftedbrow.com
- ISSN: 1835-5668

The Lifted Brow refers to an Australian not-for-profit literary organisation (also known as the TLB Society Inc.) and the quarterly print literary magazine/journal it publishes. Founded in Brisbane, its headquarters was later established in Melbourne.

== History ==
TLB was established in 2007 by Ronnie Scott, and then run from 2012 to 2020 by Sam Cooney. It is currently on an extended hiatus. It is a not-for-profit literary organisation which also runs the book publishing imprint Brow Books. It has been funded in part by Creative Victoria and the Australia Council, as well as other funding bodies. The organisation is run by volunteers.

In April 2020 The Lifted Brow announced a pause in operations following an investigation by the board into allegations of sexual misconduct and unprofessional conduct by TLB workers. Following this investigation, many of the staff resigned, as did the entire governing board. A new board was installed in mid-2020 but no activity has occurred since. The board released a statement in April 2022 regarding their publishing model.

The Lifted Brow is an Australian quarterly print literary magazine/journal. There is also a digital version available.

=== History and profile ===
The Lifted Brow was established in 2007 by Ronnie Scott and edited by him until 2012. In 2012 Sam Cooney took as editor until 2014 when he handed over editorial duties to Ellena Savage, Stephanie Van Schilt and Gillian Terzis who edited the publication for a couple of years, before Annabel Brady-Brown and Zoe Dzunko took over in 2016. The magazine was also edited by Justin Wolfers, and then Jini Maxwell, who co-edited until 2020.

Contributors who have appeared in the magazine include Margaret Atwood, Neil Gaiman, Wayne Koestenbaum, Helen Garner, Anne Boyer, Douglas Coupland, Roxane Gay, Heidi Julavits, Tom Bissell, Eileen Myles, Margo Lanagan, Tracy K. Smith, Diane Williams, Sam Lipsyte, Sheila Heti, and thousands of others.

Loosely falling under the literary journal category, the magazine features longform non-fiction and fiction, flash fiction, commentary, criticism, poetry, as well as artwork, drawings, comics, and music. Early versions of the publication were a perfect-bound journal format, and then in its middle years it embraced the tabloid newsprint format, before in 2015 evolving to the high-quality matte magazine format that is currently published four times annually. For a few years editions of The Lifted Brow included an arts and cultural lift-out called 'Middlebrow', which featured film, book, and television reviews, and articles profiling new video games, theatre, and music. Some editions have been themed; themes have included "Food", "Music", "Capitalism", "Medicine", "Art", and "Perth". The theme for December 2019 was "Digital Intimacies". The most successful issue of the magazine in terms of impact and sales was the Blak Brow edition, edited and designed and managed entirely by Australian First Nations people, and publishing only First Nations contributors.

In 2013 TLB published its first anthology: The Best of The Lifted Brow: Volume One, edited by Ronnie Scott and celebrating the first five years of the magazine (2007–2011). It featured Jim Shepard, Karen Russell, Daniel Handler, Lisa Brown, Heidi Julavits, Adam Levin, Karen Coin, Rick Moody, Robert Shearman, n a bourke, Glen David Gold, Blake Butler, Michaela McGuire, Liam Pieper, Romy Ash, Luke Ryan, Tao Lin, Benjamin Law, Benjamin Kunkel, Christos Tsiolkas, Tom Cho, Alice Pung, and Elspeth Muir. The second volume of The Best of The Lifted Brow was published in November 2017 and included contributions from Eileen Myles, Wayne Macauley, Paola Balla, Peter Polites, Margaret Atwood, Margo Lanagan, Darren Hanlon, Upulie Divisekera, Fiona Wright, Safia Elhillo, Ellena Savage, Ryan O'Neill, Briohny Doyle, Chris Somerville, Adam Curley, Rosanna Stevens, Shaun Prescott, Pip Smith, Nic Low, Rebecca Harkins-Cross, Wendy Xu, Matthew Hickey, Sam George-Allen, Zora Sanders, Nic Holas, Regrette Etcetera, Oscar Schwartz, Dion Kagan, Jana Perkovic, Danez Smith, Eugenia Flynn, and Khalid Warsame.

In 2015, The Lifted Brow launched its annual Prize for Experimental Non-fiction, which first went to Oscar Schwartz for his piece 'Humans Pretending to be Computers Pretending to be Humans', judged by John D’Agata, Daniel M Lavery, and Rebecca Giggs. The 2016 prize judges were Helen Macdonald, Kate Zambreno, Dodie Bellamy and Maria Tumarkin, and they declared W.J.P. Newnham's piece 'Trashman Loves Maree' the winner. In 2017 the judges were Eileen Myles, Wayne Koestenbaum, Leslie Jamison, Fiona Wright and Claudia La Rocco, and the winner was 'An Architecture of Early Motherhood (and Independence)’, by Stephanie Guest and Kate Riggs. In 2018 judges Nadja Spiegelman, Ander Monson and Ellena Savage chose big beautiful female theory by Eloise Grills as the winner. In 2019 Timmah Ball, Chris Kraus and Quinn Eades judged, with 'TRETINOIN' by Jean Bachoura the winner.

In 2015, The Lifted Brow won the inaugural 'Best Original Non-fiction' prize, judged by Shazna Nessa and Lynn Barber, at the Stack Magazines awards, beating out over 170 other titles. After being shortlisted several more times over the years in several of the award's categories, they won 'Best Original Non-fiction' again in 2019.

As of March 2020 there had been 45 issues of The Lifted Brow published. In April 2020 The Lifted Brow announced a pause in operations following the global COVID-19 pandemic and also an investigation by the board into sexual misconduct and unprofessional conduct by a TLB worker, which found the allegations either untrue or unable to be resolved. Following this process, the board resigned en masse; a new board consisting of staff members installed themselves in mid-2020.

== Brow Books ==
In 2015, The Lifted Brow announced that it was expanding into book publishing. Brow Books was created in 2016 to publish the authors and books that established publishing houses were largely ignoring due to perceived lack of commercial viability.

In 2018, the Brow put out a call soliciting manuscripts translated by Australians. "If you are translating a work from a language that is underrepresented, we want to hear from you." The Brow also entered into a co-publishing agreement with Tilted Axis, a nonprofit dedicated to publishing contemporary Asian literature. The agreement gives Brow right of first refusal in Australia and New Zealand for Tilted Axis titles.

=== Published works ===
2016

- The Island Will Sink, the debut novel of longtime Lifted Brow contributor Briohny Doyle

2017

- Shaun Prescott's debut novel The Town
- Law School by Benjamin Law and Jenny Phang, with illustrations by Beatrix Urkowitz
- The Best of The Lifted Brow: Volume Two

2018

- Axiomatic by Maria Tumarkin, a Stella Prize shortlisted novel
- Apple and Knife, a collection of short stories by Indonesian writer Intan Paramaditha, translated by Stephen J Epstein of Victoria University of Wellington
- Pink Mountain on Locust Island, Jamie Marina Lau's Stella Prize shortlisted debut novel
- Han Yujoo's The Impossible Fairytale, translated from Korean by Janet Hong
- One Good Turn, the first book of Mary Leunig's illustrations to be published in 25 years
- Small Beauty, by debut author Jiaqing Wilson-Yang
- Balancing Acts: Women in Sport, edited by Justin Wolfers with Erin Riley. Contributors to this non-fiction work include Brunette Lenkic, Imogen Smith, Jodi McAlister, Nicole Hayes, Danielle Warby, Kasey Symons, Emma Jenkins, Erin Stewart, Ellen Van Neerven, Kate Doak, Holly Isemonger, Gina Rushton, Charlotte Guest, Katerina Bryant, Nadia Bailey, Savannah Indigo, Stephanie King, Laura Buzo, Roslyn Helper, and Rebecca Slater.
- Going Postal: More Than 'Yes' or 'No', edited by Quinn Eades and Son Vivienne

2019

- Comic artist Mandy Ord's When One Person Dies The Whole World is Over
- This Young Monster by Charlie Fox
- Bright by Duanwad Pimwana, the first English language novel by a Thai woman to appear outside of Thailand. The text was translated by Mui Poopoksakul

2020

- The Relationship is the Project: Working with Communities, edited by Jade Lillie with Kate Larsen, Cara Kirkwood and Jax Jacki Brown
- Apsara Engine by Bishakh Som
- Dizzy Limits: Recent Experiments in Australian Nonfiction, an anthology edited by Sam Cooney and Freya Howarth

=== Signed works ===
Brow Books had signed several books for publication before its hiatus began in early 2020. Most authors elected to leave and sign their books with other publishing houses in 2020, including:

Title	Author	Published by
Gunk Baby, a novel	Jamie Marina Lau	Now with Hachette Australia
Dropbear, a poetry collection	Evelyn Araluen	Now with University of Queensland Press
Big Beautiful Female Theory, a narrative non-fiction work	Eloise Grills	Now with Affirm Press
Stone Fruit, a graphic novel	Lee Lai	Published by Fantagraphics, 2021.
Anam, an autofiction/autotheory work	André Dao	Published by Penguin Books Australia
Traumascapes, a new edition of this non-fiction work	Maria Tumarkin	
Vietnamatta, a collection of writings	Stephen Pham	Not yet signed by another publisher
Happiness, a graphic novel/book-length comic	Nicky Minus	Not yet signed by another publisher
At Night He Lifts Weights, a short fiction collection	Kang Young-sook (translated by Janet Hong)	Not yet signed by another publisher
Fuji	Jamie Marina Lau	Not yet signed by another publisher

== See also ==
- List of literary magazines
