= Axiomatic (Tumarkin book) =

2018 book by Maria Tumarkin

- Author: Maria Tumarkin
- Genre: Creative non-fiction
- Publisher: Brow Books
- Publication date: 2018
- Publication place: Australia
- Pages: 224
- Awards: Windham-Campbell Prize
- ISBN: 9781925704051

Axiomatic is a 2018 book by Maria Tumarkin. It was published in Australia by Brow Books and in the United States by Transit Books. The book is a work of creative non-fiction, structured as a collection of five essays that explore five different "axioms" or common sayings. It was the winner of the 2020 Windham-Campbell Prize for Non-Fiction, and was named on the shortlists for the 2019 Stella Prize and Douglas Stewart Prize for Non-Fiction.

== Summary ==
Axiomatic is structured as a collection of five essays exploring five axioms: time heals all wounds, those who forget the past are condemned to repeat it, history repeats itself, give me a child before the age of seven and I will show you the woman, and you can’t enter the same river twice.

== Reception ==
Axiomatic was positively received by reviewers. The book was named one of the ten best books of 2019 by The New Yorker and received a starred review in Publishers Weekly. A review in The Saturday Paper likened Tumarkin to Australian author Helen Garner and Nobel laureate Svetlana Alexievich, writing that the work was a remarkable book filled with risks. In Australian Book Review, Darius Sepehri wrote that the book was filled with a "freewheeling energy", but that its unconventional style sometimes jarred with its emotional affect. In The Australian, Liam Pieper wrote that Tumarkin's "narrative pyrotechnics complement the unabashed power and beauty of the writing — intense, angry, empathetic, relentless", concluding that Tumarkin was "simply operating on a higher level to the rest of us". A review in Kirkus Reviews wrote that Tumarkin's writing was reminiscent of that of Joan Didion, and concluded that the book "asks deep, difficult questions and refuses to settle for easy answers".

== Awards ==
Awards for Axiomatic
Year	Award	Category	Result	Ref.
2020	Windham-Campbell Prize	Non-Fiction	Won	
2019	Stella Prize	—	Shortlisted	
2019	New South Wales Premier's Literary Awards	Douglas Stewart Prize for Non-Fiction	Shortlisted	
2019	National Book Critics Circle Award	Award for Criticism	Shortlisted	
2019	Victorian Premier's Literary Awards	Non-Fiction	Shortlisted	
2019	Prime Minister's Literary Awards	Non-Fiction	Shortlisted	
2018	Melbourne Prize for Literature	Best Writing Award	Won	
