= Melbourne Prize Trust =

The Melbourne Prize Trust is a charitable foundation in Melbourne, Victoria, Australia. It was founded in 2004 by Simon H. Warrender for the specific purpose of awarding three arts awards on a rotating three-year basis: the Melbourne Prize for Urban Sculpture, the Melbourne Prize for Literature, and the Melbourne Prize for Music. The first Melbourne Prize for Urban Sculpture was awarded in 2005.

== History ==
The Melbourne Prize Trust was founded by Simon H. Warrender, son of Simon Warrender, in 2004. The trust was an arts initiative of the Committee for Melbourne, which had been founded by Warrender Jr.'s mother, Pamela Myer Warrender OAM (daughter of Sir Norman Myer).

Simon Warrender announced the establishment of the prizes after the unveiling of Magic Pudding, a sculpture commissioned by him for the Ian Potter Foundation Children's Garden at the Royal Botanic Gardens Melbourne. The trust sells miniatures of the sculpture to contribute to the prize money.

The inaugural prize awarded by the trust in 2005 was the Melbourne Prize for Urban Sculpture.

== Governance ==
The Melbourne Prize Trust is governed by a board, headed by chair Janine Kirk AO with founder Simon H. Warrender in the roles of executive director and secretary.

== Prizes ==
The trust grants awards on a rolling three-year basis for Urban Sculpture, Literature and Music, in that order. The prizes are intended "to provide opportunities for Victorian writers, musicians and sculptors and recognise and reward excellence and talent, inspire creative development and enrich public life".

=== Urban Sculpture ===
Recipients for the Melbourne Prize for Urban Sculpture include:

- 2005: OSW (Open Spatial Workshop), comprising Terri Bird, Bianca Hester, and Scott Mitchell, with then collaborator Natasha Johns-Messenger, for Groundings. OSW, founded in 2003, continues as a collaborative group comprising Bird, Hester, and Mitchell, producing works of many kinds: sculpture, installation, curated events, publications, and video production. Bird is an artist, writer and academic at the Department of Fine Art at Monash University; Hester is at the University of Sydney; and Mitchell is connected to RMIT.
- 2008: Alexander Knox, for Maxims of Behaviour
- 2011: Bianca Hester, for A World, Fully Accessible by No Living Being, in Federation Square
- 2014: Geoff Robinson, for 15 locations / 15 minutes / 15 days
- 2017: Daniel von Sturmer, for Electric Light (Facts/Figures/Federation Square)
- 2020: Beth Arnold, Mikala Dwyer, Emily Floyd, Nicholas Mangan, Kathy Temin, and Field Theory; in an unprecedented move, the six finalists decided to share the prize, pool their winnings, and split the pool seven ways, giving a seventh of the winnings to an Indigenous Australian community organisation, to highlight "the absence of First Nations voices and culturally diverse representation in the 2020 Prize"
- 2023: Maree Clarke, "for her recent experimental work in glass as well as the pivotal role she has played in the Victorian Indigenous art scene over the past three decades"

=== Literature ===
Apart from the Melbourne Prize for Literature, which is given for a writer's body of work "which has made an outstanding contribution to Australian literature and to cultural and intellectual life", other literary prizes are also awarded as part of this event. The Civic Choice Award has been retained from the beginning, but other prize names have varied over the years, including: Best Writing Award (later including a residency); and Readings Residency Award. The $20,000 Writers Prize was introduced in 2015 as part of the 10th anniversary celebrations of the Melbourne Prize, sponsored by the Copyright Agency. It is open to published authors for an essay of 10,000–20,000 words. Five finalists receive $2,000 each.

In 2021, apart from the main prize, there was the Civic Choice Award, the Writer's Prize, and the Professional Development Award (created 2021). As of 2021, the Civic Choice Award is given to the finalist who in both the Melbourne Prize for Literature and Writer's Prize received the highest number of votes from the public.

==== Melbourne Prize for Literature ====
- 2006: Helen Garner
- 2009: Gerald Murnane
- 2012: Alex Miller
- 2015: Chris Wallace-Crabbe
- 2018: Alison Lester
- 2021: Christos Tsiolkas
- 2024: Alexis Wright

==== Civic Choice Award ====
- 2006: Henry von Doussa for The Park Bench
- 2009: Amra Pajalic for The Good Daughter
- 2012: Tony Birch for Blood
- 2015: Robyn Annear for Places Without Poetry
- 2018: Louise Milligan for Cardinal
- 2021: Maxine Beneba Clarke
- 2024: Judith Bishop

==== Best Writing Award (worth $30,000) ====
- 2006: Christos Tsiolkas for Dead Europe
- 2009: Nam Le for The Boat
- 2012: Craig Sherborne for The Amateur Science of Love
- 2015: Andrea Goldsmith for The Memory Trap
- 2018: Maria Tumarkin for Axiomatic
- 2021: N/A

==== Other awards ====
Writers Prize and Residency

- 2015: Kate Ryan for Psychotherapy for Normal People
- 2018: N/A
- 2021: N/A
- 2024: N/A

Readings Residency Award

- 2018: Jamie Marina Lau
- 2021: N/A
- 2024: N/A

Writer's Prize

- 2021: Eloise Grills, for her essay "The Fat Bitch in Art"
- 2024: Carrie Tiffany, for her essay "Seven Snakes"

Professional Development Award

- 2021: Evelyn Araluen
- 2024: N/A

=== Music ===
The Melbourne Prize for Music is worth $60,000. The trust also awards the $20,000 Beleura Emerging Composers Award, and the $10,000 Professional Development Award. Recipients for the Melbourne Prize for Music include:

- 2007: Paul Grabowsky
- 2010: David Jones
- 2013: Brett Dean
- 2016: Kutcha Edwards
- 2019: Deborah Cheetham Fraillon
- 2022: Missy Higgins
