= Gunk Baby =

2021 novel by Jamie Marina Lau

- Author: Jamie Marina Lau
- Cover artist: Richard Oriolo
- Language: English
- Genre: Literary fiction
- Published: 2021 (Hachette); 2022 (Astra)
- Publication date: April 28, 2021
- Publication place: Australia
- Media type: Print
- Pages: 346 (paperback, 1st edition)
- ISBN: 9780733646270
- OCLC: 1305439857

Gunk Baby is a literary fiction novel by Jamie Marina Lau. It is Lau's second novel after 2018's Pink Mountain on Locust Island.

== Plot ==
Leen is a 24-year-old entrepreneur who opens an ear-cleaning business inside an indoor mall. She joins a group of workers in the complex who plan pranks on their managers but begins to grow disillusioned as her new-found friends become more and more violent.

== Development history ==
Gunk Baby originated as an unpublished short story, with Lau starting work on the novel in earnest sometime in 2018. Lau began with an idea of the protagonist and developed the rest of the novel around her. In an interview with Our Culture, Lau described her intention with the novel to "write about the colonial experience."

=== Publication history ===
Gunk Baby was first published on April 28, 2021, in Australia by Hachette. The Australian release was followed by a July 8, 2021 release in the United Kingdom by Weidenfeld & Nicolson. Gunk Baby was published in the United States on December 13, 2022, by Astra Publishing House.

== Reception ==
Gunk Baby received positive reception from critics upon its initial Australian release. Declan Fry, writing in The Guardian, described the book as "a dissociative meditation on a world that has come to feel increasingly cruel and meaningless" and praised Lau's prose. Cher Tan, in The Saturday Paper, noted that Lau's writing had a distinctive style reminiscent of Susan Choi and Ottessa Moshfegh. Upon the novel's release in the United States, Publishers Weekly wrote positively about the first half of the book but criticized the ending and pacing throughout. Kirkus Reviews described the book as "funny, bold, capacious, and more than a little exhausting."
