= Larry Catuzzi =

American football player and coach

Biographical details
- Born: c. 1935 (age 90–91)

Playing career
- 1956–1957: Delaware
- Position: Quarterback

Coaching career (HC unless noted)
- 1960: Dayton (assistant)
- 1961–1964: Indiana (assistant)
- 1965–1967: Ohio State (assistant)
- 1968–1970: Williams

Head coaching record
- Overall: 11–13

Lawrence R. "Larry" Catuzzi (born c. 1935) is an American former college football player and coach and investment banker. He served as the head football coach at Williams College from 1968 to 1970, compiling a record of 11–13. He is the father of 9/11 victim Lauren Grandcolas.

== Athlete ==
Catuzzi was the quarterback for the Delaware Fightin' Blue Hens football from 1956 to 1957. He still holds the Delaware school record for best passing percentage in a game; he completed eight of ten passes against Lehigh in 1956 for an .800 completion percentage.

== Coaching ==
Catuzzi held assistant coaching positions at the University of Dayton (backfield coach in 1960), Indiana University (offensive backfield coach, 1961–1964), and Ohio State University (1965–1967). He was the head football coach at Williams College from 1968 to 1970, compiling a record of 11–13. In October 1970, Catuzzi described his approach to football at Williams College as follows: "Our approach to football is low-key. We don't take ourselves as seriously as the high-pressure schools do. The kids are playing because they want to play. ... Football at Williams is another extracurricular activity offered in the fall, and not a matter of life-and-death."

== Later years ==
Catuzzi left coaching in the 1970s and became an investment banker. He has held positions with Financial Security Assurance, Inc., Rauscher Pierce Refsnes, Inc., Underwood, Neuhaus & Co., Inc. and the Morgan Guaranty Trust Company of New York.

In the early 1980s, Catuzzi was the president of the Bluebonnet Bowl Association, the sponsor of the Bluebonnet Bowl in Houston, Texas.

In 1998, Catuzzi was appointed to the Harris County-Houston Sports Authority. He became the Vice Chairman of the organization, and his current term expires in August 2010. He is also a member of the Boards of Directors of the American Diabetes Association.

== Flight 93 National Memorial ==
Catuzzi's daughter, Lauren Grandcolas, died on September 11, 2001, as a passenger on United Airlines Flight 93. Since the incident, Catuzzi has been active in seeking to develop and finance the Flight 93 National Memorial. He is a director of the Lauren Catuzzi Grandcolas Foundation and the Flight 93 Federal Advisory Commission.

== Head coaching record ==
Year	Team	Overall	Conference	Standing	Bowl/playoffs
Williams Ephs (Little Three Conference) (1968–1970)
1968	Williams	4–4	0–2	3rd	
1969	Williams	4–4	0–2	3rd	
1970	Williams	3–5	0–2	3rd	
Williams:		11–13			
Total:		11–13			
