= Lauren Grandcolas =

Victim of the 9/11 attacks (1963–2001)

- Born: Lauren Catuzzi; August 31, 1963; Bloomington, Indiana, U.S.
- Died: September 11, 2001 (aged 38); Stonycreek Township, Pennsylvania, U.S. on board UA 93
- Cause of death: Plane crash during the September 11 attacks
- Known for: Passenger aboard United Airlines Flight 93
- Spouse: Jack Grandcolas (m. 1991)
- Children: 1 unborn child

Lauren Catuzzi Grandcolas (née Catuzzi; August 31, 1963 – September 11, 2001) was one of the passengers on board United Airlines Flight 93 on September 11, 2001, who made calls providing information about the hijacking of the flight as part of the September 11 attacks. She made a call to her husband on an airphone and left a message telling him of a "problem with the plane".

== Biography ==
Grandcolas (née Catuzzi) was born on August 31, 1963, in Bloomington, Indiana, her father is College football player Larry Catuzzi. She attended Stratford High School in Houston, Texas, and later the University of Texas at Austin where she was a member of Alpha Delta Pi. She met her husband, Jack Grandcolas, at the university.

She worked for a law firm and for PricewaterhouseCoopers before becoming a marketing expert for Good Housekeeping. Grandcolas was also writing a book on self-help for women, covering finance and other topics. At the time of her death, a publisher was interested in her book.

Her sisters worked together with the publisher, Chronicle Books, to get the book published after her death. The book, entitled You Can Do It!: The Merit Badge Handbook for Grown-Up Girls, was published on April 10, 2005. It provides a guide, modeled on the Girl Scouts' merit badge system, covering skills, such as negotiations, and life goals, such as horseback riding, scuba diving, and completing a triathlon. Book excerpts have appeared in Parade, Glamour, Shape, Good Housekeeping, and other magazines. Grandcolas's sisters appeared on Good Morning America on April 19, 2005, to discuss the book. The proceeds from sales of the book go to the Lauren Catuzzi Grandcolas Foundation, which contributes funds to a college scholarship program.

Grandcolas was also involved with charitable organizations, including the United Way, March of Dimes, Project Open Hand, Juvenile Diabetes Foundation, Breast Cancer Awareness, and Glide Memorial. She was also a certified emergency medical technician.

== United Flight 93 ==
"Jack, pick up sweetie, can you hear me? Okay. I just want to tell you, there's a little problem with the plane. I'm fine. I'm totally fine. I just want to tell you how much I love you."

— Message left by Lauren Grandcolas from United 93 at 09:39:21.

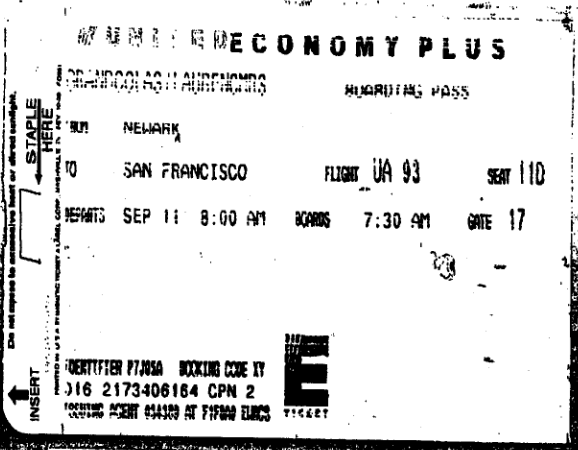
Lauren Grandcolas' boarding pass for Flight 93

Grandcolas had been attending her grandmother's funeral in Carlstadt, New Jersey, and was returning home to San Rafael, California. She arrived early at the airport on September 11, 2001, allowing her to board United Airlines Flight 93, which was earlier than her originally scheduled flight.

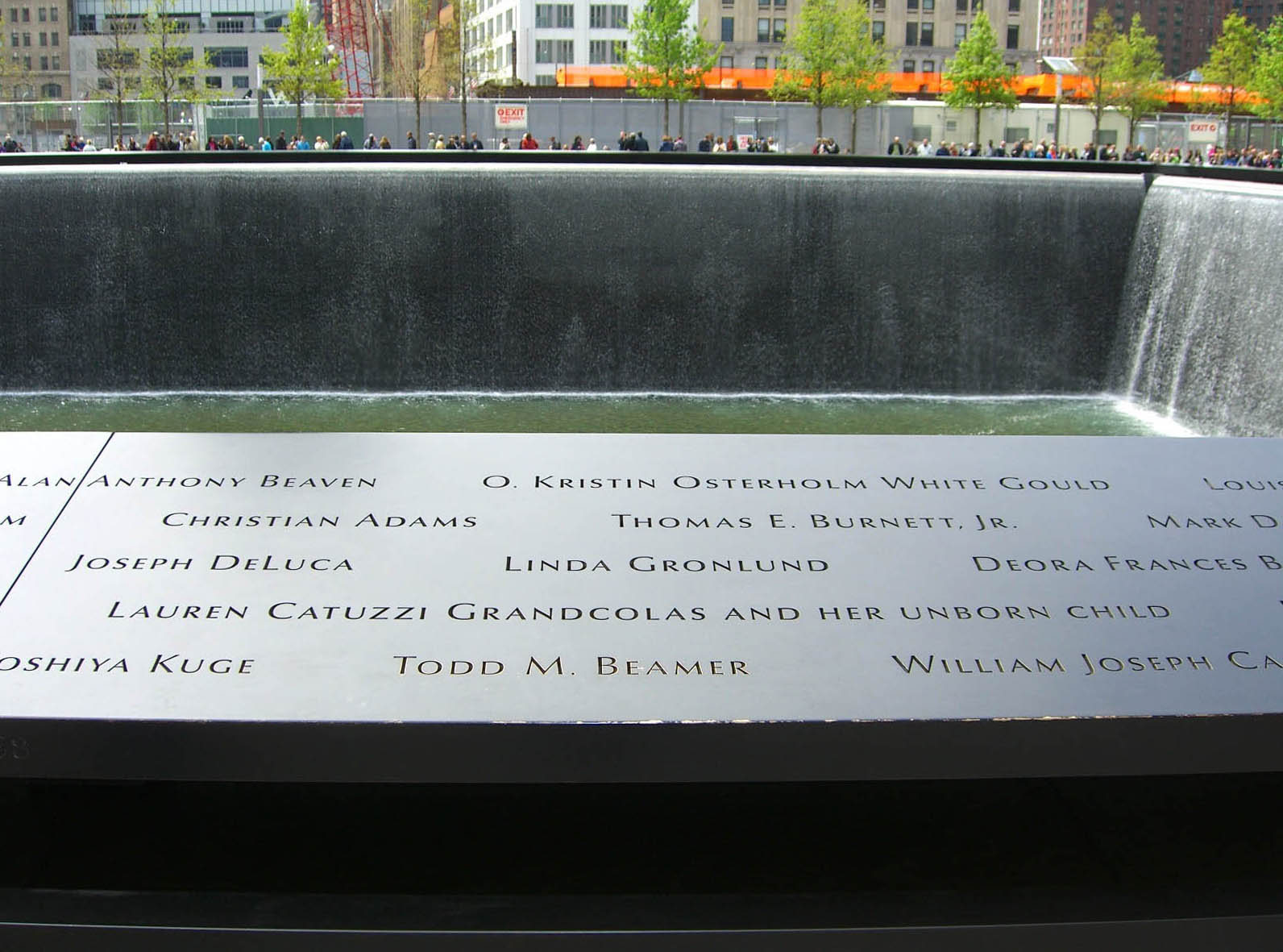
Grandcolas's name and her unborn child are memorialized on Panel S-68 of the South Pool of the National September 11 Memorial.

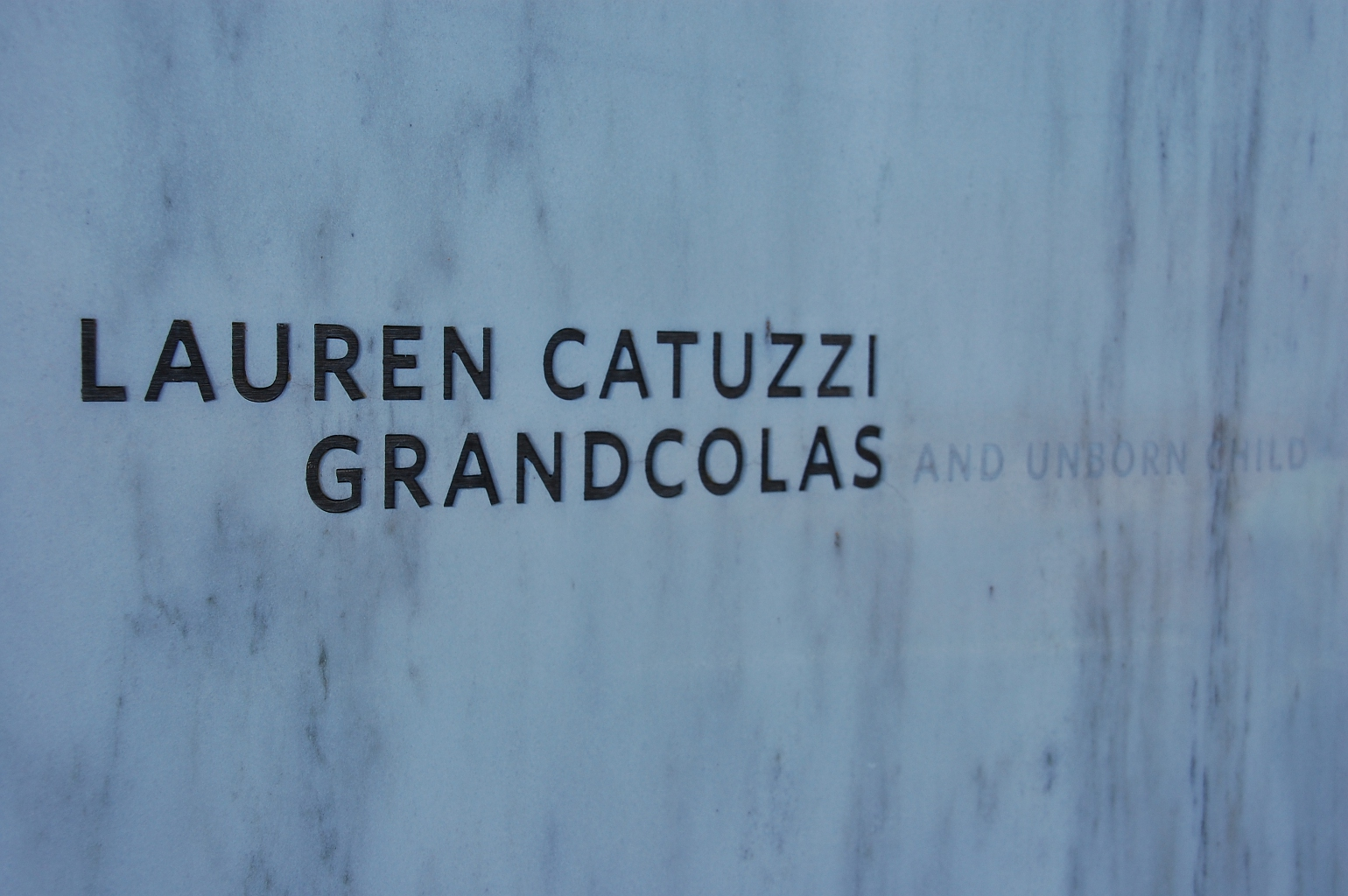
Detail of Grandcolas's name on the Flight 93 National Memorial

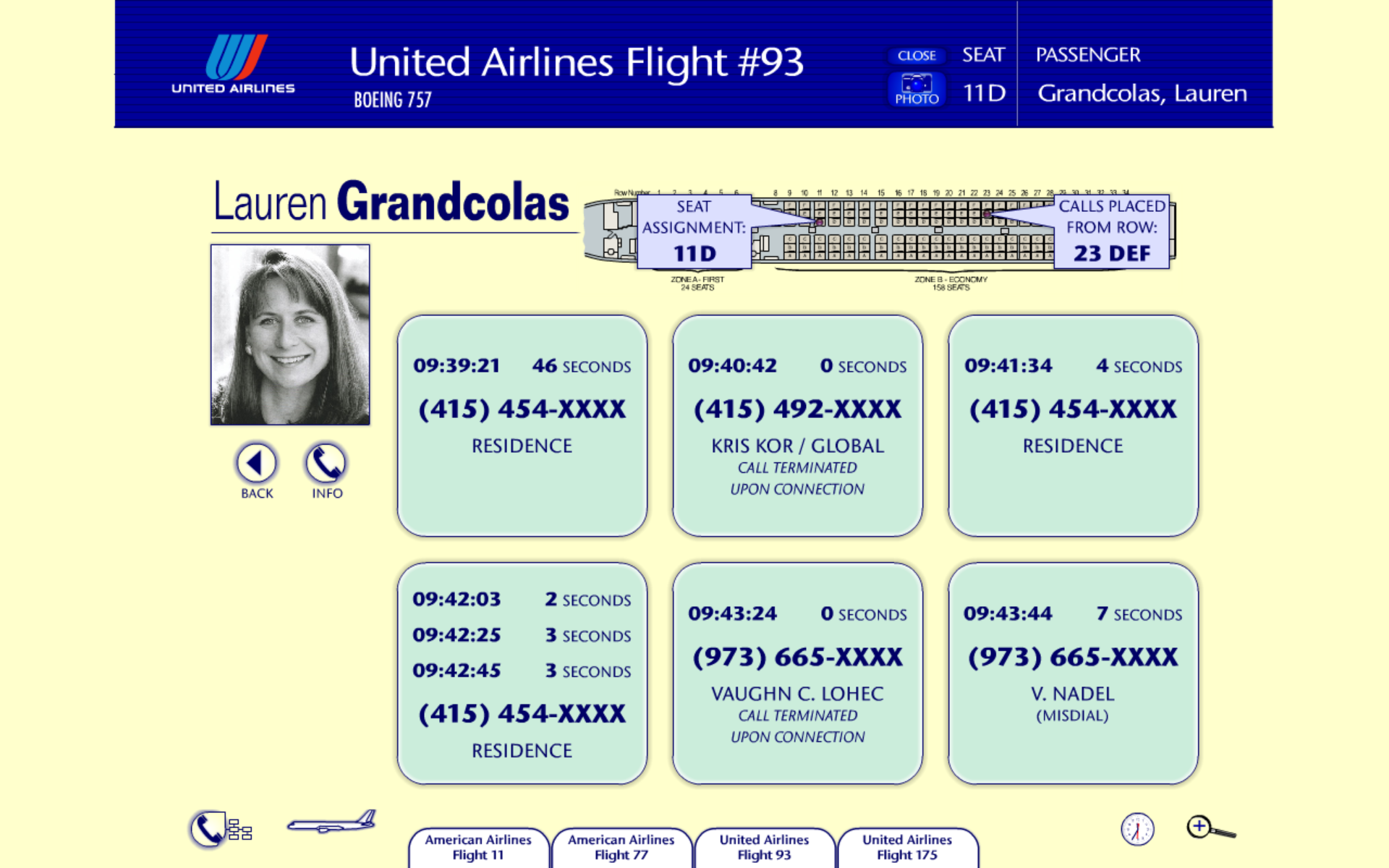
Phone call details

Grandcolas, who was originally seated in seat 11D, called her husband from towards the rear of the aircraft in row 23. She left a message for her husband, who was still sleeping, telling him of the "problem with the plane". Her last phone message to her husband was played in the docudrama The Flight That Fought Back. She then passed her phone to Honor Elizabeth Wainio. At the time of her death, at the age of 38, she was three months pregnant with their first child.

Grandcolas's father, Lawrence R. Catuzzi, served as co-chairman of the Flight 93 National Memorial task force, from 2002 to 2005.

Grandcolas and her unborn child were memorialized at the South Pool, on Panel S-68, along with other passengers on Flight 93, at the National 9/11 Memorial.

== Published works ==
- You Can Do It!: The Merit Badge Handbook for Grown-Up Girls, 2005 Chronicle Books; Bk&Sticker ISBN 0-8118-4635-0 (Published posthumously through the efforts of her sisters, Vaughn Lohec and Dara Near)

== In popular culture ==
- In the 2005 television film The Flight That Fought Back, which depicts the passenger uprising inside the hijacked United Airlines 93, Grandcolas is portrayed by Christy Dawn Little.
- She is portrayed by Jacqueline Ann Steuart in the 2006 film Flight 93.
- She is portrayed by Kate Jennings Grant in the 2006 film United 93.
