= Glessner Bridge =

- U.S. National Register of Historic Places
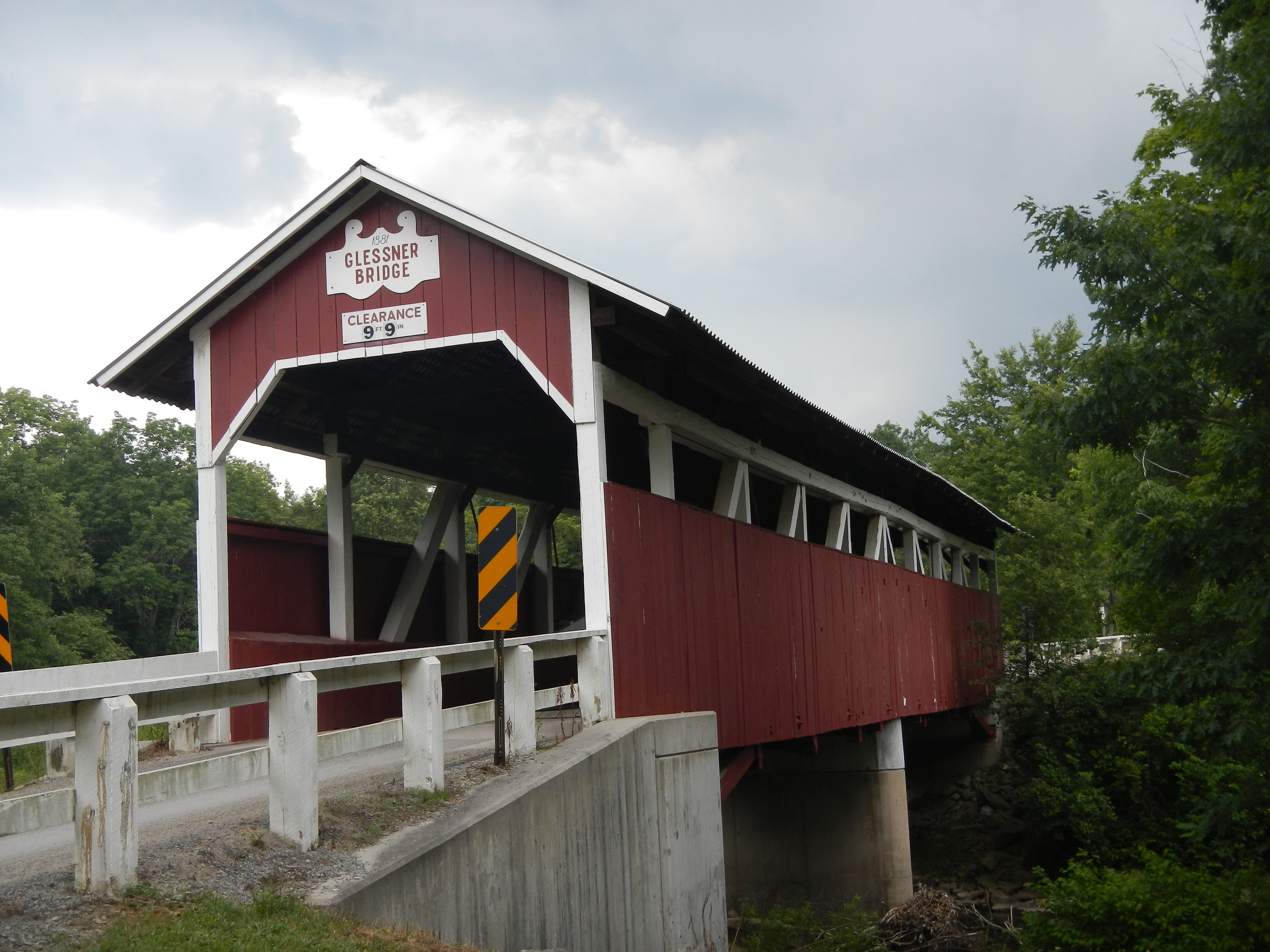
- Glessner Bridge, July 2012

- Location within Pennsylvania Location within the United States
- Location: Northwest of Shanksville off Legislative Route 55068, Stonycreek Township, Pennsylvania
- Coordinates: 40°1′33″N 78°55′16″W
- Area: 0.1 acres (0.040 ha)
- Built: 1881
- Built by: Tobias Glessner
- Architectural style: Kingpost truss
- MPS: Covered Bridges of Somerset County TR
- NRHP reference No.: 80003631
- Added to NRHP: December 10, 1980

The Glessner Bridge is a historic covered bridge in Stonycreek Township, Somerset County, Pennsylvania. It was built in 1881, and is a 90-foot-long (27 m), multiple Kingpost truss bridge, with half-height plank siding and a tin covered gable roof. The bridge crosses Stonycreek River. It is one of ten covered bridges in Somerset County.

It was added to the National Register of Historic Places in 1980.
