= Nam Le =

Vietnamese-born Australian writer (born 1978)

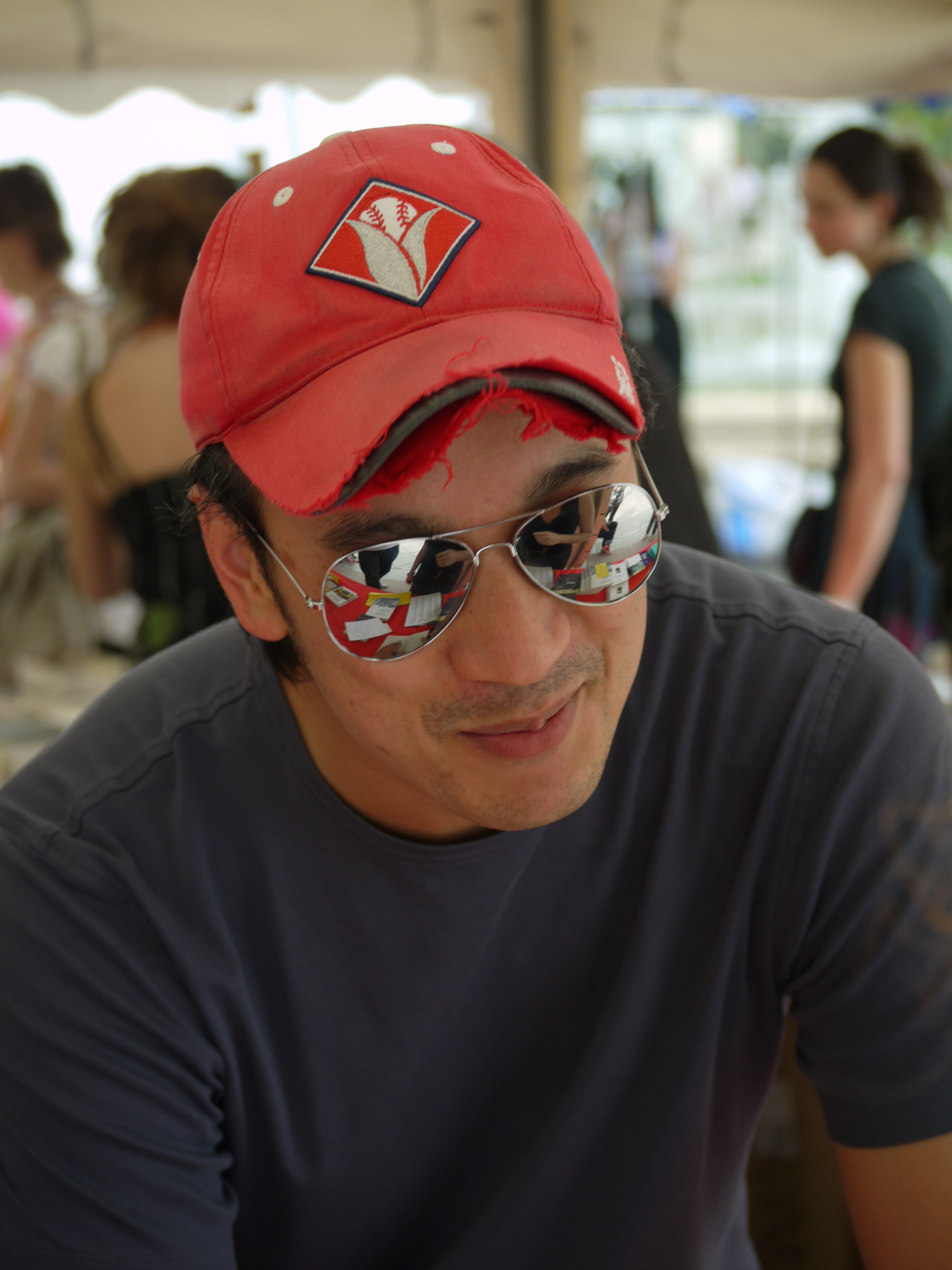
Nam Le in autograph session at the Comédie du Livre of Montpellier in France, in 2010.

Nam Le (Vietnamese: Lê Nam; born 1978) is a Vietnamese-born Australian writer, who won the Dylan Thomas Prize for his book The Boat, a collection of short stories. His stories have been published in many places including Best Australian Stories 2007, Best New American Voices, Zoetrope: All-Story, A Public Space and One Story. In 2008 he was named a "5 Under 35" honoree by the National Book Foundation. In 2024 he published his first poetry collection with Knopf, 36 Ways of Writing a Vietnamese Poem.

== Early life and education ==
Nam Le came to Australia from Vietnam with his parents, when he was less than a year old, as a boat refugee. He attended Melbourne Grammar School and the University of Melbourne, from which he graduated with a BA (Hons) and LLB (Hons). His Arts thesis supervisor was the Australian poet Chris Wallace-Crabbe. He worked as a corporate lawyer and was admitted to the Supreme Court of Victoria in 2003/2004.

Le decided to turn to writing, and in 2004 attended the Iowa Writers' Workshop in the United States where he completed a master's degree in creative writing. He became fiction editor at the Harvard Review. His first short story was published in Zoetrope in 2006. Nam Le also held fellowships at the Fine Arts Work Center in Provincetown in 2006, and at Phillips Exeter Academy, in 2007.

In an interview on Australian ABC radio, he said he turned from law to writing due to his love of reading: "I loved reading, and if you asked me why I decided to become a writer, that's the answer right there, because I was a reader and I was just so enthralled and thrilled by the stuff that I'd read that I just thought; what could be better? How could you possibly better spend your time than trying to recreate that feeling for other people." In the same interview he said that his first writing was poetry.

He returned to Australia in 2008, but is moving to Great Britain to take up a writing fellowship at the University of East Anglia.

When asked about his source of inspiration, Nam Le said in 2008 that "I’d say I’m most inspired by my parents for the choices and sacrifices they’ve made. It still boggles me."

== Career ==
=== The Boat ===
The book, first published in 2008, comprises seven short stories which take the reader to such places as Colombia, New York City, Iowa, Tehran, Hiroshima, and small-town Australia. In the opening story, Love and Honor and Pity and Pride and Compassion and Sacrifice, he writes about a Vietnamese-born character called Nam Le who is attending a writing workshop in Iowa. In a conversation with Michael Williams he said about the practice of using a narrator close to "self" in a story:

A lot of people presume if I'm writing a narrator who has clear parallels to me, that's just sheer inertia; that there's a natural adaptation from so-called life to so-called text. But any careful reader or writer would understand how much artifice and contrivance go into making this self-standing and self-contained. Actually it's tougher: if I stick in something that has more resonance for me than is communicated on the page, then that's a failure of my charge as a writer . . . I'm not creating a good enough space for the reader to come in and fully partake in that scene or that language or that line."

Each story provides "a snapshot of a pivotal point in the characters' lives."

Nam Le has said of his Vietnamese heritage and writing that:

My relationship with Vietnam is complex. For a long time I vowed I wouldn’t fall into writing ethnic stories, immigrant stories, etc. Then I realized that not only was I working against these expectations (market, self, literary, cultural), I was working against my kneejerk resistance to such expectations. How I see it now is no matter what or where I write about, I feel a responsibility to the subject matter. Not so much to get it right as to do it justice. Having personal history with a subject only complicates this – but not always, nor necessarily, in bad ways. I don’t completely understand my relationship to Vietnam as a writer. This book is a testament to the fact that I’m becoming more and more okay with that.

Australian short story writer Cate Kennedy, interviewing Nam Le, said that The Boat has put the short story back in "the literary centre stage."

== Style ==
Regarding his style, Nam Le said in an interview that "one of the demarcations is writers that deal primarily with language, the more lyrical minded writers, and writers that are more structurally oriented. I always used to...I started out writing poetry and reading poetry, and so I always knew that that was the side that I was most predisposed to, and so I actually had to be quite careful in these stories to not overdo that impulse, to not throw too many images or indulge too many lyrical flights of fancy."

== Awards and honors ==
=== Honors ===
- 2007: Michener-Copernicus Fellowship
- 2008: National Book Foundation's "5 Under 35" Award

=== Literary awards ===
Year	Title	Award	Category	Result	Ref.
2007	—	Pushcart Prize	—	Won	
2008	The Boat	Dylan Thomas Prize	—	Won	
2008	The Boat	Frank O'Connor International Short Story Award	—	Longlisted	
2009	The Boat	Anisfield-Wolf Book Award	Fiction	Won	
2009	The Boat	Australian Book Industry Awards	Book of the Year	Shortlisted	
2009	The Boat	Australian Book Industry Awards	Newcomer	Won	
2009	The Boat	Dayton Literary Peace Prize	—	Longlisted	
2009	The Boat	Melbourne Prize for Literature	Writing Award	Won	
2009	The Boat	New South Wales Premier's Literary Awards	Book of the Year	Won	
2009	The Boat	New South Wales Premier's Literary Awards	UTS Glenda Adams Award	Won	
2009	The Boat	Prime Minister's Literary Award	Fiction	Won	
2009	The Boat	Queensland Premier's Literary Awards	Arts Queensland Steele Rudd Award	Won	
2009	The Boat	Victorian Premier's Literary Awards	Vance Palmer Prize for Fiction	Shortlisted	
2009	The Boat	Western Australian Premier's Book Awards	Fiction	Shortlisted	
2010	—	PEN/Malamud Award	—	Won	
2025	36 Ways of Writing a Vietnamese Poem	New South Wales Premier's Literary Awards	Book of the Year	Won	
2025	36 Ways of Writing a Vietnamese Poem	New South Wales Premier's Literary Awards	NSW Multicultural Award	Won	
2025	36 Ways of Writing a Vietnamese Poem	New South Wales Premier's Literary Awards	Kenneth Slessor Prize for Poetry	Shortlisted	
2025	36 Ways of Writing a Vietnamese Poem	Mary Gilmore Award	—	Shortlisted	

== Bibliography ==
- The Boat (2008)
- 36 Ways of Writing a Vietnamese Poem (2024)
