= Traumascapes =

2005 book by Maria Tumarkin

- Author: Maria Tumarkin
- Language: English
- Genre: Non-fiction
- Publication date: 2005
- Publication place: Australia

Traumascapes: The Power and Fate of Places Transformed by Tragedy is a 2005 book by Australian academic Maria Tumarkin. Tumarkin aims to "start a conversation about the tangible imprints left behind" at places of violent suffering. The book discusses seven such example locations: Bali, Berlin, Manhattan, Moscow, Port Arthur, Sarajevo, and the Pennsylvania crash site of the fourth September 11 plane.
