= Flight 93 National Memorial =

9/11 memorial in Pennsylvania, US

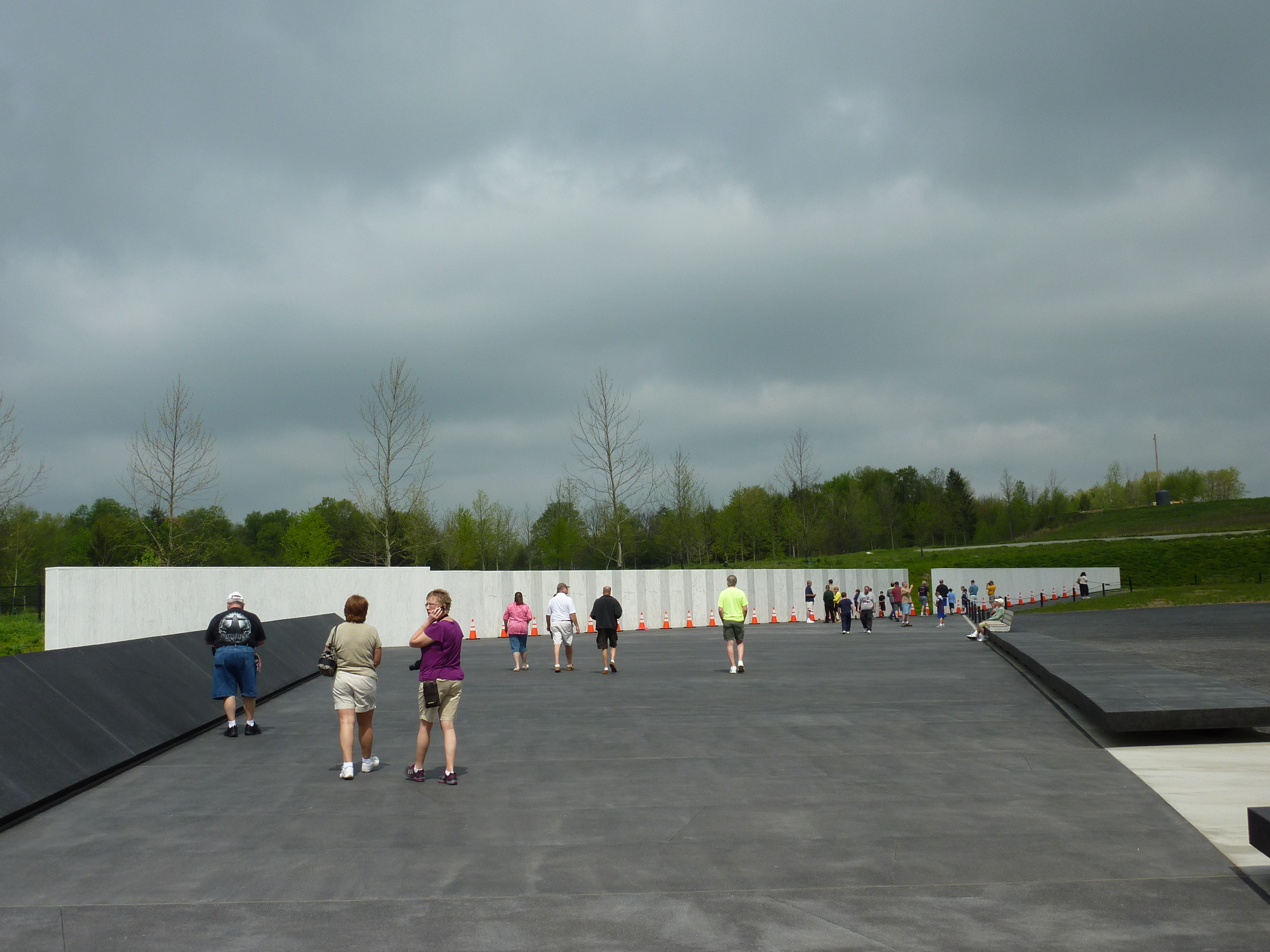
- The white marble Wall of Names positioned on the flight path

- Location within Pennsylvania Location within the United States
- Location: Stonycreek Township, Somerset County, Pennsylvania, United States
- Nearest city: Johnstown, Pennsylvania, United States
- Coordinates: 40°3′24″N 78°54′21″W
- Area: 2,321 acres (9.39 km^{2})
- Established: September 24, 2002
- Visitors: 377,810 (in 2023)
- Governing body: National Park Service
- Website: Flight 93 National Memorial
- Flight 93 National Memorial
- U.S. National Register of Historic Places
- U.S. National Memorial
- Location: 6424 Lincoln Highway, Stoystown, PA 15563, Shanksville vicinity, Stonycreek Township, Somerset County, Pennsylvania, United States
- Architect: Paul Murdoch Architects
- NRHP reference No.: 04000272
- Added to NRHP: September 24, 2002

The Flight 93 National Memorial is a memorial built to commemorate the crash of United Airlines Flight 93, which was one of four aircraft hijacked during the September 11 attacks in 2001. The memorial is located in Somerset County, Pennsylvania, with the vast majority in Stonycreek Township, and with a small portion in Shade Township. It is 78 miles (126 km) southeast of Pittsburgh, 122 miles (196 km) west of Harrisburg (the state capital), and 226 miles (364 km) west of Philadelphia.

A national memorial was created to honor the passengers and crew of Flight 93, who stopped the terrorists from reaching their target by fighting the hijackers. A temporary memorial to the 40 victims was established soon after the crash. The first phase of the permanent memorial was completed, opened, and dedicated on September 10, 2011. The design for the memorial is a modified version of the entry Crescent of Embrace by Paul and Milena Murdoch.

A concrete and glass visitor center opened on September 10, 2015, situated on a hill overlooking the crash site and the white marble Wall of Names. An observation platform at the visitor center and the white marble wall are both aligned beneath the path of Flight 93.

== United Airlines Flight 93 ==
Of the four aircraft hijacked on September 11, 2001, United Airlines Flight 93 is the only one that did not reach the hijackers' intended target, presumed to be either the United States Capitol or the White House, both in Washington, D.C. Several passengers and crew members made cellular telephone calls from the plane and learned about the attacks on the World Trade Center in New York City and the Pentagon in Arlington County, Virginia. As a result, the passengers and crew members decided to mount an assault in order to retake control of the aircraft from the hijackers. The plane crashed in a field in Stonycreek Township about 150 miles (240 kilometers) northwest of Washington, D.C., killing all 33 passengers, seven crew members, and the four hijackers.

== Temporary memorial ==
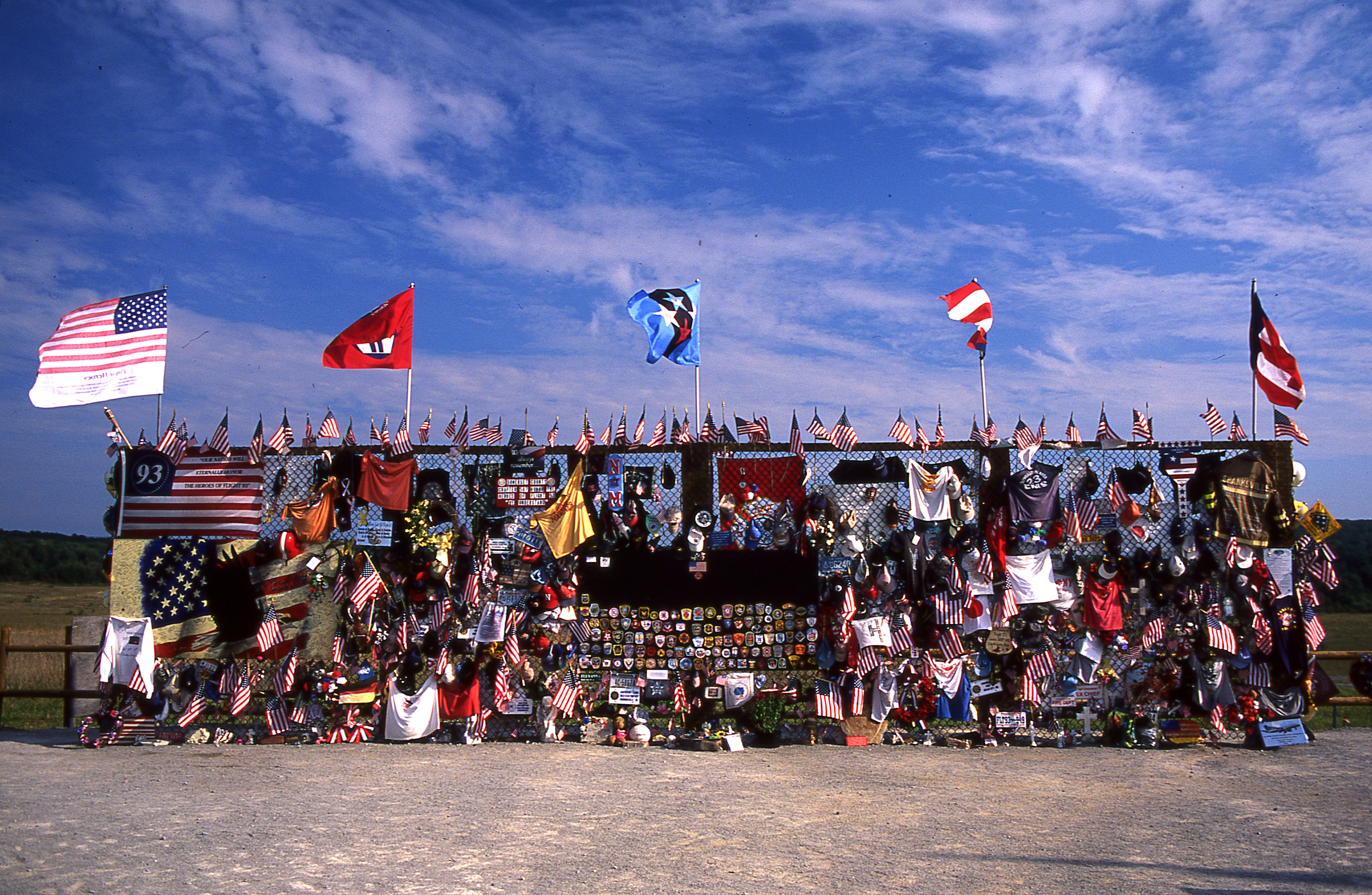
Temporary memorial at the Flight 93 crash site

The crash site was enclosed by a fence and closed to the public except for victims' family members. The temporary memorial was located on a hillside 500 yards (450 meters) from the crash site. The memorial included a 40-foot (12 m) chain-link fence – its length commemorating the 40 passengers and crew – on which visitors could leave flowers, flags, hats, rosaries, and other items. The items were collected by the National Park Service.

Many cities wanted to memorialize the heroes of United Flight 93. Among the first was Marshall, Texas, which by order of the City Commission, named a street "United Flight 93" in early 2002. The keynote speaker was Barbara Catuzzi, the mother of victim Lauren Grandcolas.

Next to the fence were several memorials including a bronze plaque of names, flags, and a large cross. The temporary memorial also included a row of small wooden angels, one for each passenger or crew member. There were also handwritten messages on the guardrails at the memorial. At the memorial site, there was also a small building where visitors could sign a guestbook. The building was staffed by National Park Service volunteers, called ambassadors, who answered questions. In the years following the attacks, approximately 150,000 visitors each year came to the memorial site, a number that reached nearly a million people as of July 2008.

The temporary memorial, for years on land leased for the memorial by Svonavec, Inc., a coal company based in Somerset, Pennsylvania, was moved in 2008 because the company did not renew the lease. It was moved across the road on land that is part of about 900 acres (360 hectares) that the Families of Flight 93 foundation bought in 2008.

== Permanent memorial ==
Flight 93 National Memorial Act
- Long title: An Act to authorize a national memorial to commemorate the passengers and crew of Flight 93 who, on September 11, 2001, courageously gave their lives thereby thwarting a planned attack on our Nation's Capitol, and for other purposes.
- Enacted by: the 107th United States Congress

Citations
- Public law: Pub. L. 107–226 (text) (PDF)

Legislative history
- Introduced in the House as H.R. 3917 by John Murtha (D–PA) on March 7, 2002; Committee consideration by House Resources; Passed the House on July 22, 2002 (voice vote); Passed the Senate on September 10, 2002 (unanimous consent); Signed into law by President George W. Bush on September 24, 2002

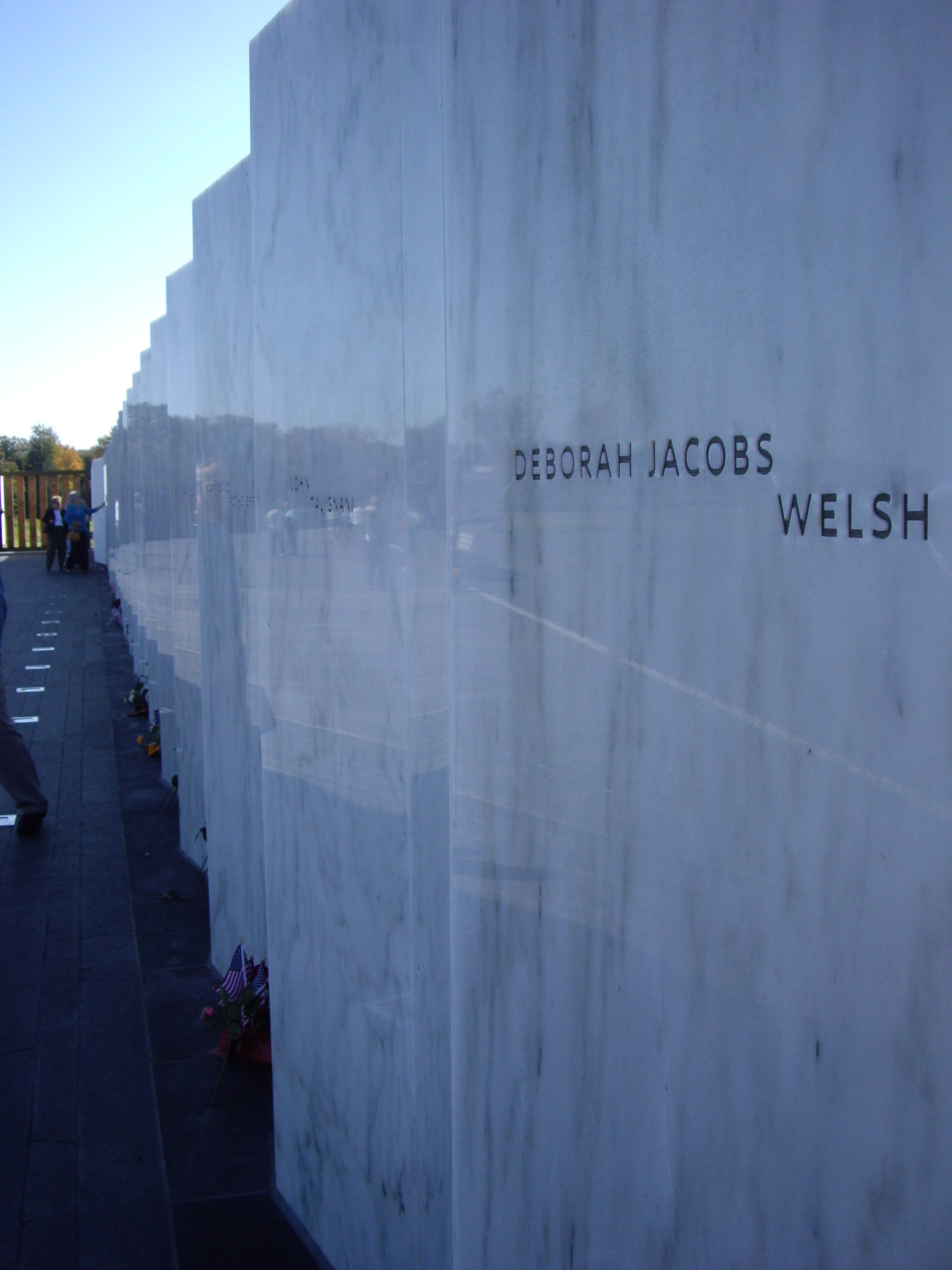
Wall of Names at the Flight 93 National Memorial

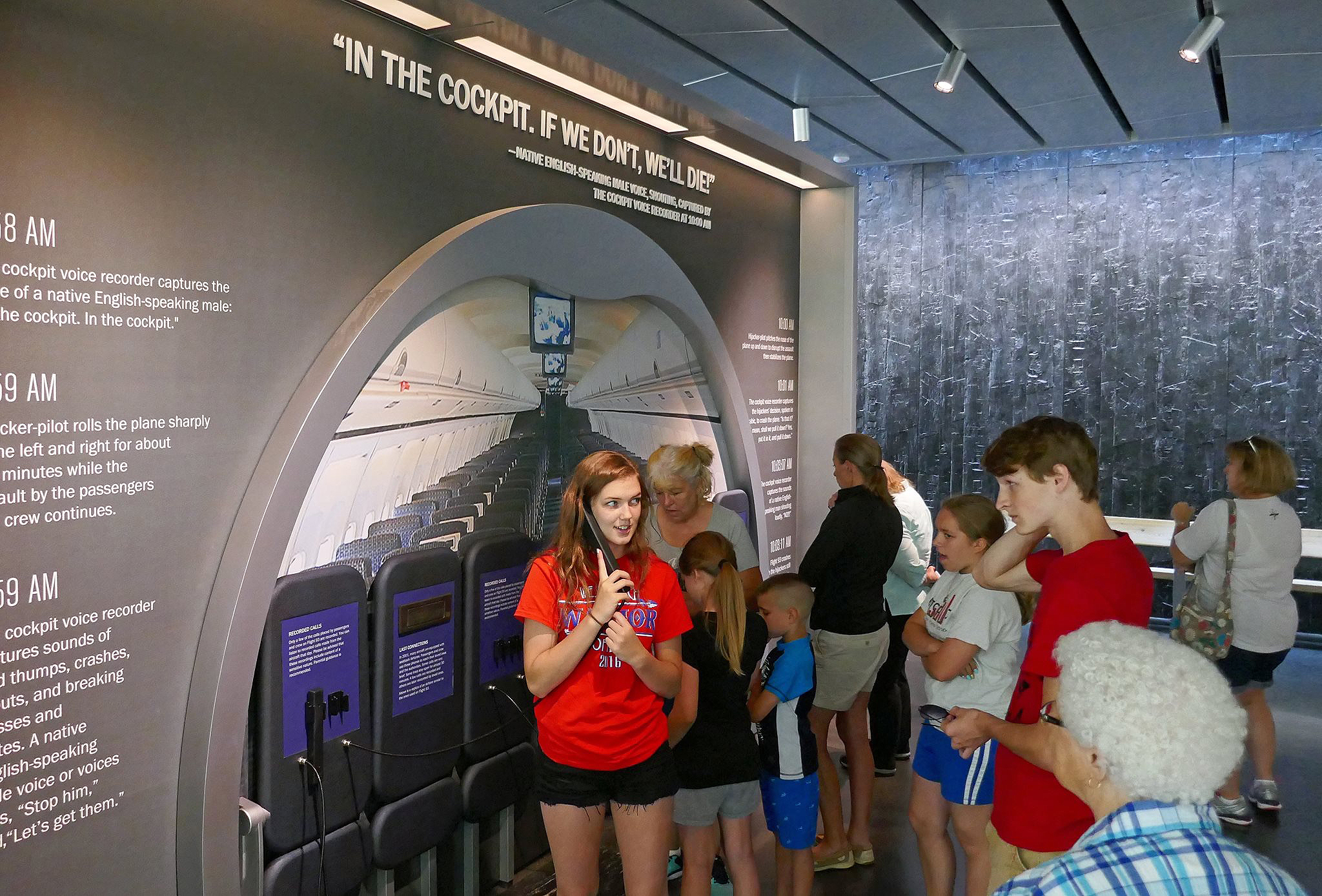
A group examines an audiovisual display at the Flight 93 National Memorial visitor center.

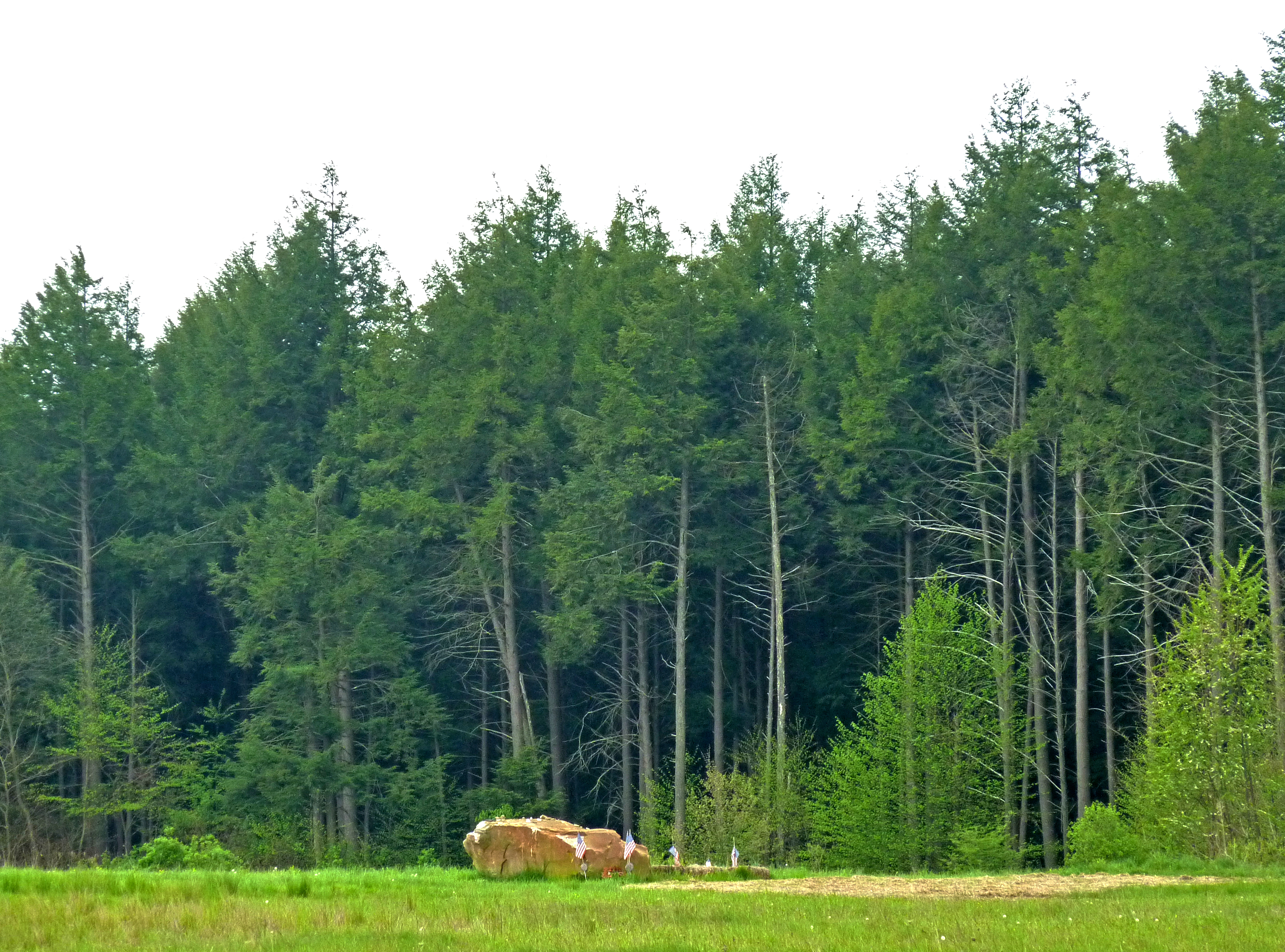
A boulder marks the impact zone of Flight 93.

On March 7, 2002, Congressman John Murtha (PA-12) introduced a bill in the United States House of Representatives to establish a National Memorial to be developed by a commission, and ultimately administered by the National Park Service. On April 16, 2002, Senator Arlen Specter (PA) introduced a version of the "Flight 93 National Memorial Act" in the Senate. On September 10, 2002, the bill passed both houses of Congress. The final bill specifically excluded the four hijackers from being memorialized. When signed by President George W. Bush on September 24, 2002, it became Public Law No. 107-226, and the site was listed on the National Register of Historic Places. By September 2005, the Flight 93 Advisory Commission was required to send to the secretary of the interior and Congress recommendations for the planning, design, construction, and long-term management of a permanent memorial. The Act also provided for the purchase of any required land from willing sellers.

The Flight 93 National Memorial Campaign is a partnership among the Families of Flight 93, the Flight 93 Federal Advisory Commission, the Flight 93 Memorial Task Force, the National Park Service, the National Park Foundation and many representatives of local, state and national organizations, agencies and interests, as well as people from around the world to build a permanent memorial. Launched in 2005, this public-private partnership sought to raise $30 million from philanthropic individuals, corporations and foundations to enable the construction of the Flight 93 National Memorial. After 14 years of planning and development, the Flight 93 National Memorial was completed and opened to family members of the victims on September 10, 2015.

=== Land acquisition ===
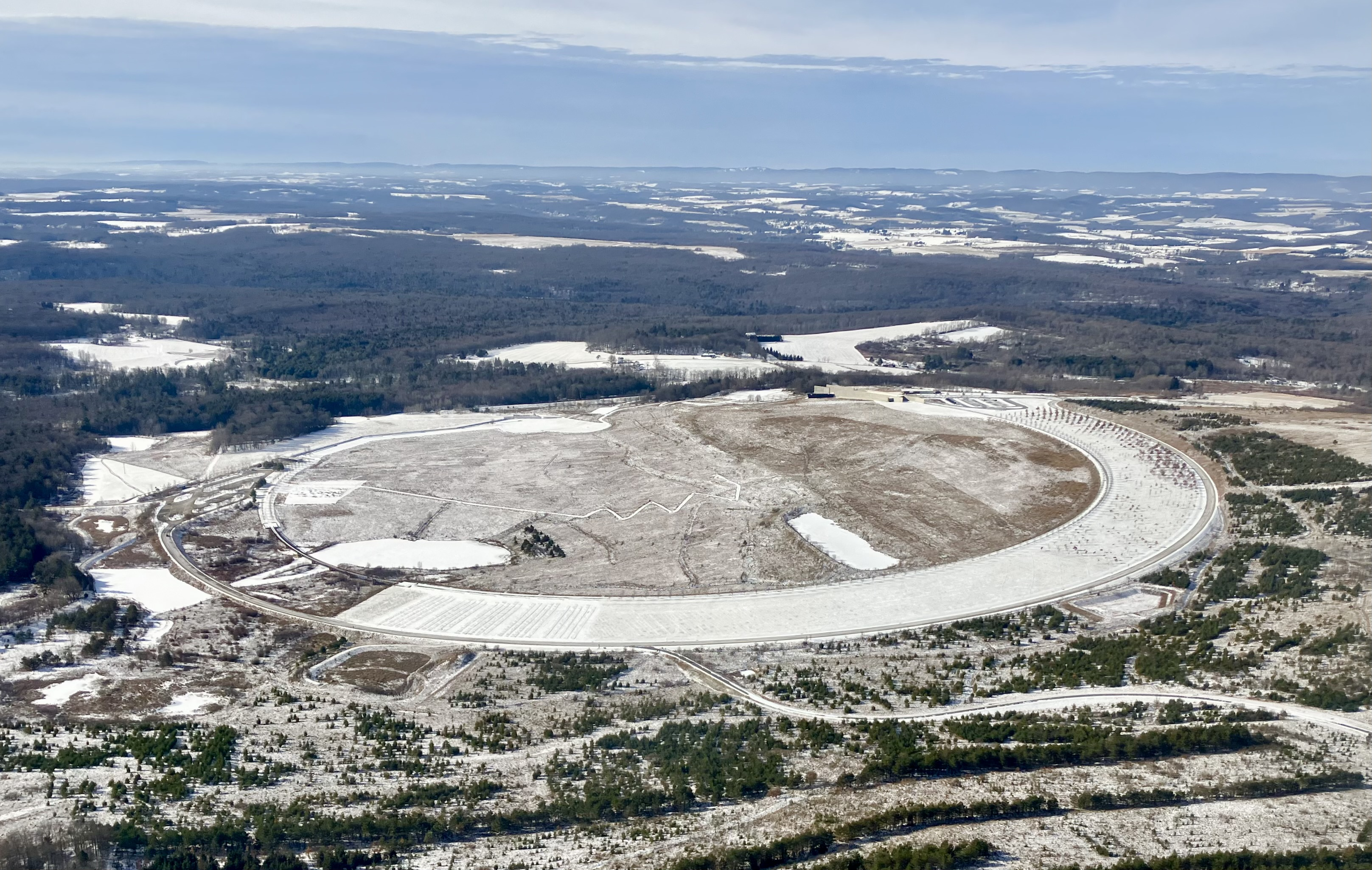
Aerial view in 2024

The boundaries of the National Memorial extend from Lambertsville Road to U.S. Route 30 (Lincoln Highway), where the entrance is located. It is about 2,200 acres (890 ha), of which about 1,000 acres (400 ha) are privately held but protected through partnership agreements. The memorial site itself is a 400-acre (160 ha) bowl-shaped area, with 1,800 acres (730 ha) surrounding as a buffer. In December 2002, landowner Tim Lambert donated 6 acres (2.4 ha) at the crash site and entered discussions with the Conservation Fund regarding an additional 160 acres (65 ha). Using some funds donated from receipts for the film United 93, the Families of Flight 93 organization purchased 3 acres (1.2 ha) in the summer of 2006. The organization sought $10 million in federal funding to use for acquiring land. In November 2006, the Conservation Fund acquired 100 acres (40 ha) as buffer land, to be managed by the Pennsylvania Game Commission. PBS Coals Inc. sold 900 acres (360 ha) to the families' organization in March 2008.

Svonavec, Inc. owned a 275-acre (111 ha) parcel, which was a reclaimed strip-mine. Michael Svonavec, working with appraiser Randall Bell, submitted a letter to the National Park Service in November 2003 with plans to build a museum and visitor center on his land. Although the other property owners had sold their land for the memorial, Svonavec believed that the crash had increased the property value of its land to $23.3M, while the government only recognized the land as being worth its original value of $610,000. The Flight 93 Advisory Committee and the Families of Flight 93 wrote a letter to President George W. Bush, asking him to issue an executive order which would authorize the use of eminent domain to secure the land. Instead, Pennsylvania senators pushed an amendment through Congress which allowed the Department of the Interior to seize the land by eminent domain. The question of compensation was unsolved, and so the case of United States v. 275.81 Acres of Land was brought before a federal district court to determine proper compensation for the property. The court-appointed Commission concluded that the appropriate compensation was $1,535,000.

=== Design competition ===
==== Design selection ====
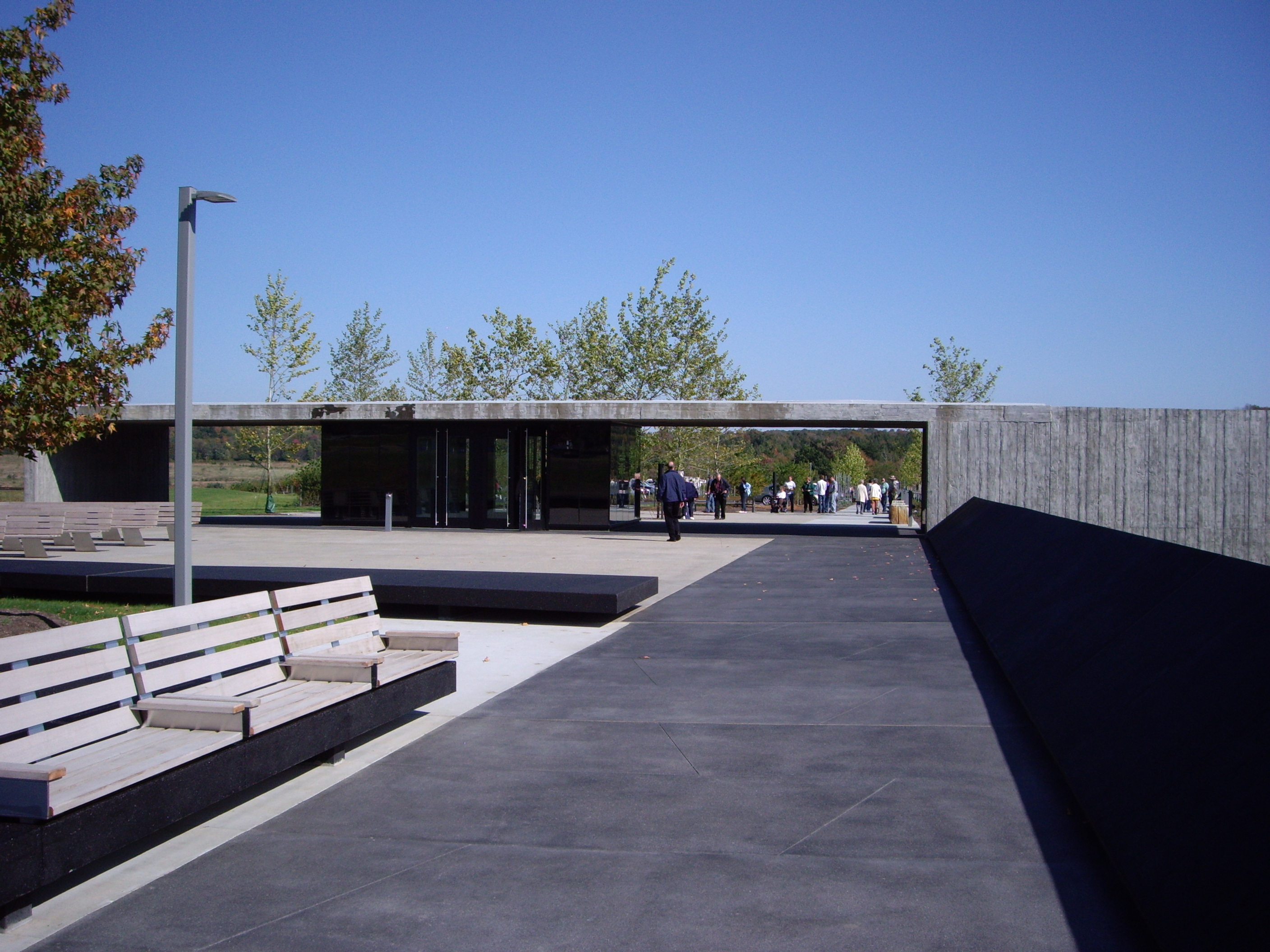
Visitor shelter at the Flight 93 National Memorial

The commission decided to select the design for the memorial through a multi-stage design competition funded by grants from the Heinz Foundations and the John S. and James L. Knight Foundation. The competition began on September 11, 2004; over 1,000 entries were submitted online. In February 2005, five finalists were selected for further development and consideration. The 15-member final jury included family members, design and art professionals, and community and national leaders. After three days of review and debate, they announced the winner on September 7, 2005: Crescent of Embrace by a design team led by Paul and Milena Murdoch of Los Angeles, with Nelson Byrd Woltz Landscape Architects.

The design featured a "Tower of Voices", containing 40 wind chimes – one for each passenger and crew member who died. A crescent would have been formed by a circular pathway lined with red maple trees that follows the natural bowl shape of the land. Forty groves of red and sugar maples and eastern white oak trees were to be planted behind the crescent. A black slate wall would mark the edge of the crash site, where the victims are buried.

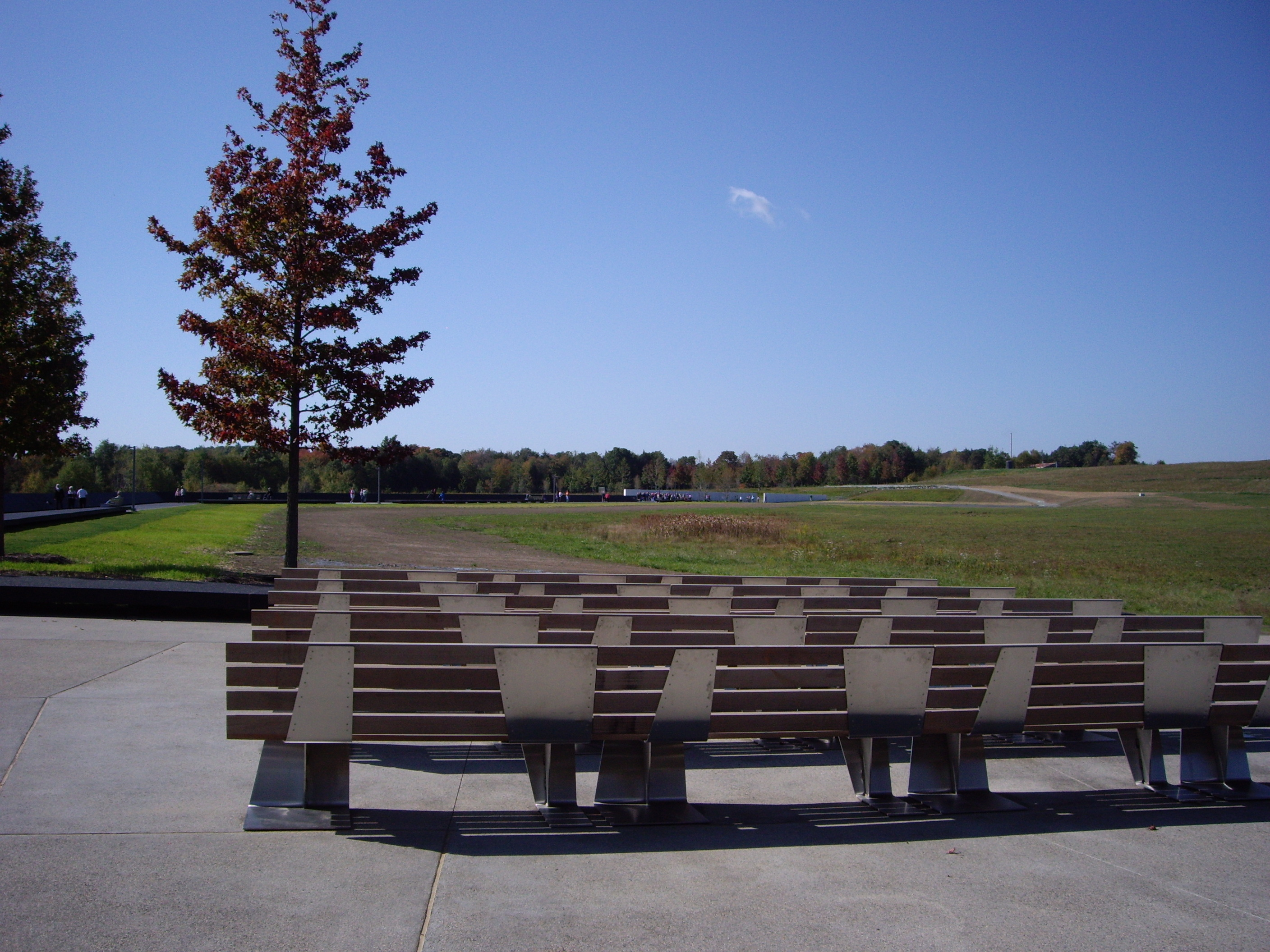
Benches facing the Wall of Names and crash site

Bloggers and religious groups criticized the new design. Jury member Tom Burnett Sr., whose son was killed in the crash, said he made an impassioned speech to his fellow jurors about what he felt the crescent represented. "I explained this goes back centuries as an old-time Islamic symbol ... I told them we'd be a laughing stock if we did this", Burnett said. Representative Tom Tancredo of Colorado opposed the design's shape "because of the crescent's prominent use as a symbol in Islam". Mike Rosen of the Rocky Mountain News wrote: "On the anniversaries of 9/11, it's not hard to visualize al-Qaeda celebrating the crescent of maple trees, turning red in the fall, "embracing" the Flight 93 crash site. To them, it would be a memorial to their fallen martyrs. Why invite that? Just come up with a different design that eliminates the double meaning and the dispute". The architect asserted that the alignment was coincidental and that there was no intent to refer to Muslim symbols, with which several victims' families agreed. Al-Qaeda and its affiliated Jihadist groups belong to the Salafi movement, which generally does not consider the crescent to be a symbol of Islam, viewing it as a later innovation of purportedly less pious empires.

Others criticized the design as too non-representational. James Lileks, a journalist and architectural commentator, wrote:

We don't need giant statues of the guys ramming the drink cart into the door. But pedantic though such a monument might be, future generations would infer the plot. All you get from a Crescent of Embrace is a sorrowful sigh of all-encompassing grief and absolution, as if the lives of all who died on that spot were equal in tragedy. They were not.

==== Modified design ====
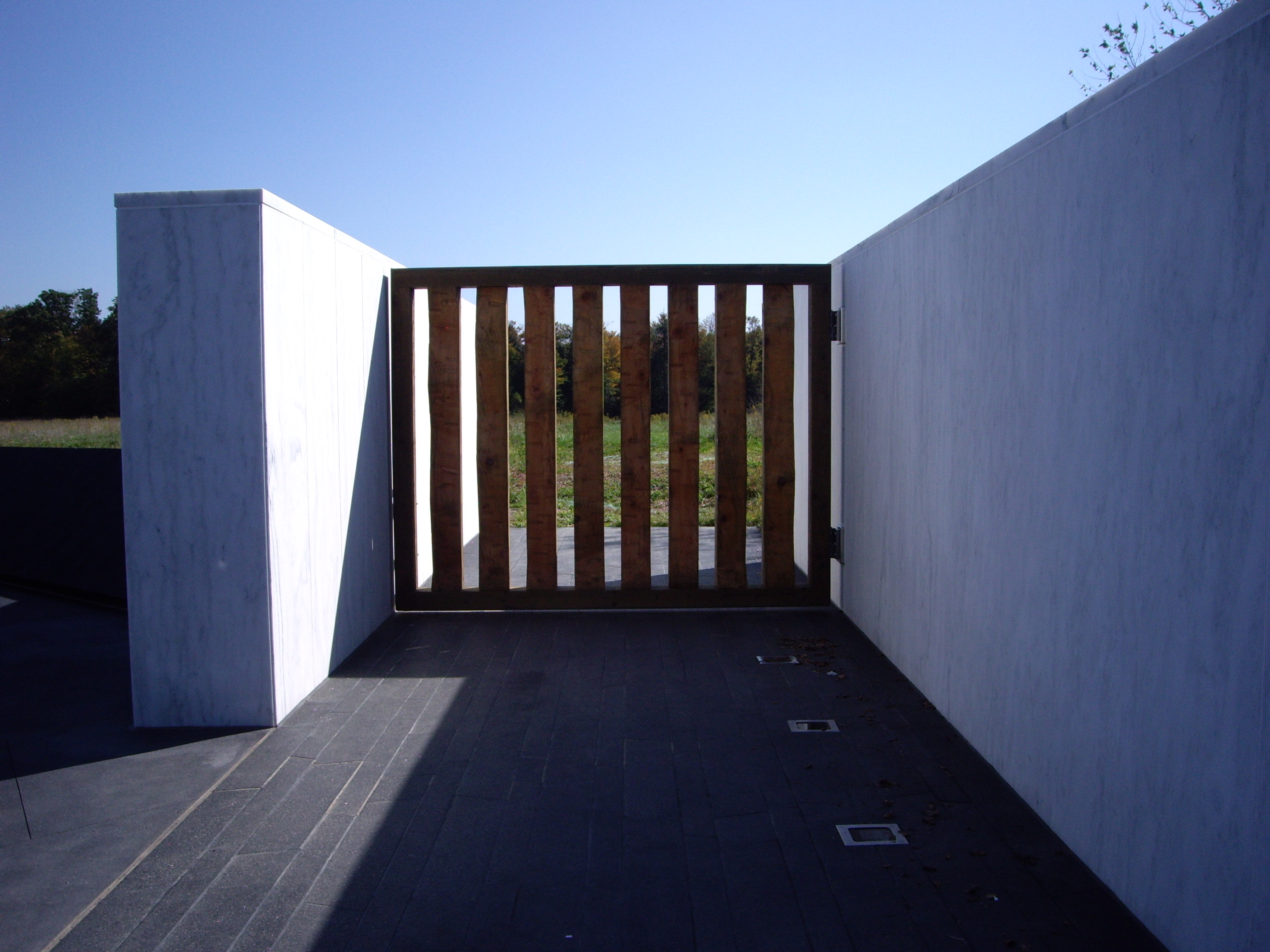
The gate to the crash site

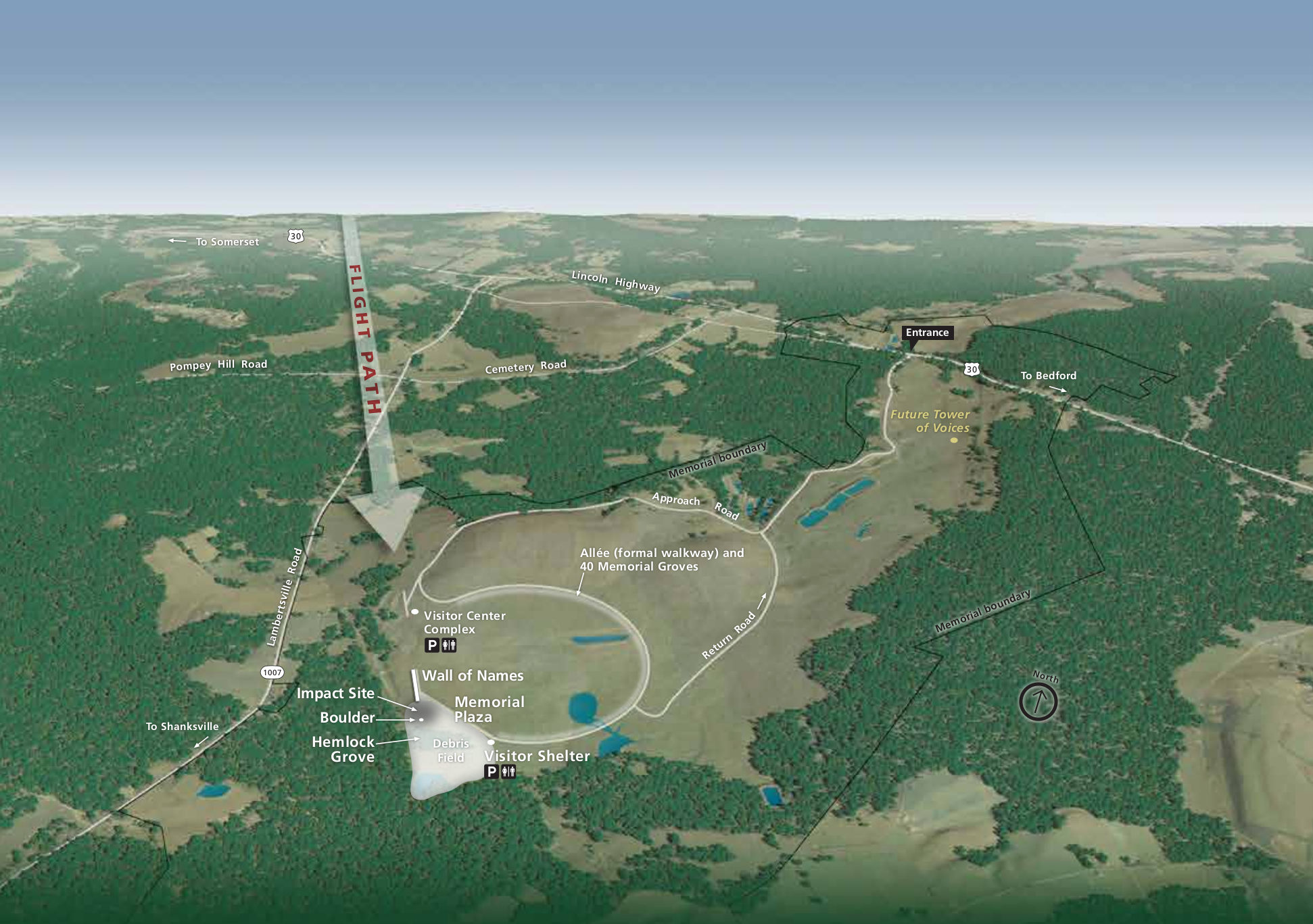
Map of the site overlaid by the flight path of United 93

In response to criticism, the designer agreed to modify the plan. The architect believes that the central elements can be maintained to satisfy criticism. "It's a disappointment there is a misinterpretation and a simplistic distortion of this, but if that is a public concern, then that is something we will look to resolve in a way that keeps the essential qualities", Murdoch said in a telephone interview to the Associated Press.

The redesigned memorial has the plain shape of a circle, as opposed to a crescent. The circle's design is bisected by the flight's trajectory, which is marked by a clearing in the trees. The new design was supposed to emphasize the area of impact. According to the memorial's architect, Paul Murdoch:

... a walkway approaches from an arrival court along the edge of and overlooking the Sacred Ground. The walkway eventually widens in from a ceremonial gate and the wall of names, composed of 40 panels of 3-inch-thick (7.6 cm) slabs of polished white granite, 8 feet (2.4 m) tall, each inscribed with a name of the 40 heroes. Two walls flanking the gate are clad in polished white granite and the flight path is paved with black granite. Beyond the gate is the impact site ... planted with wildflowers, and the hemlock grove beyond.

=== Construction ===
==== Phase 1: Wall of Names ====
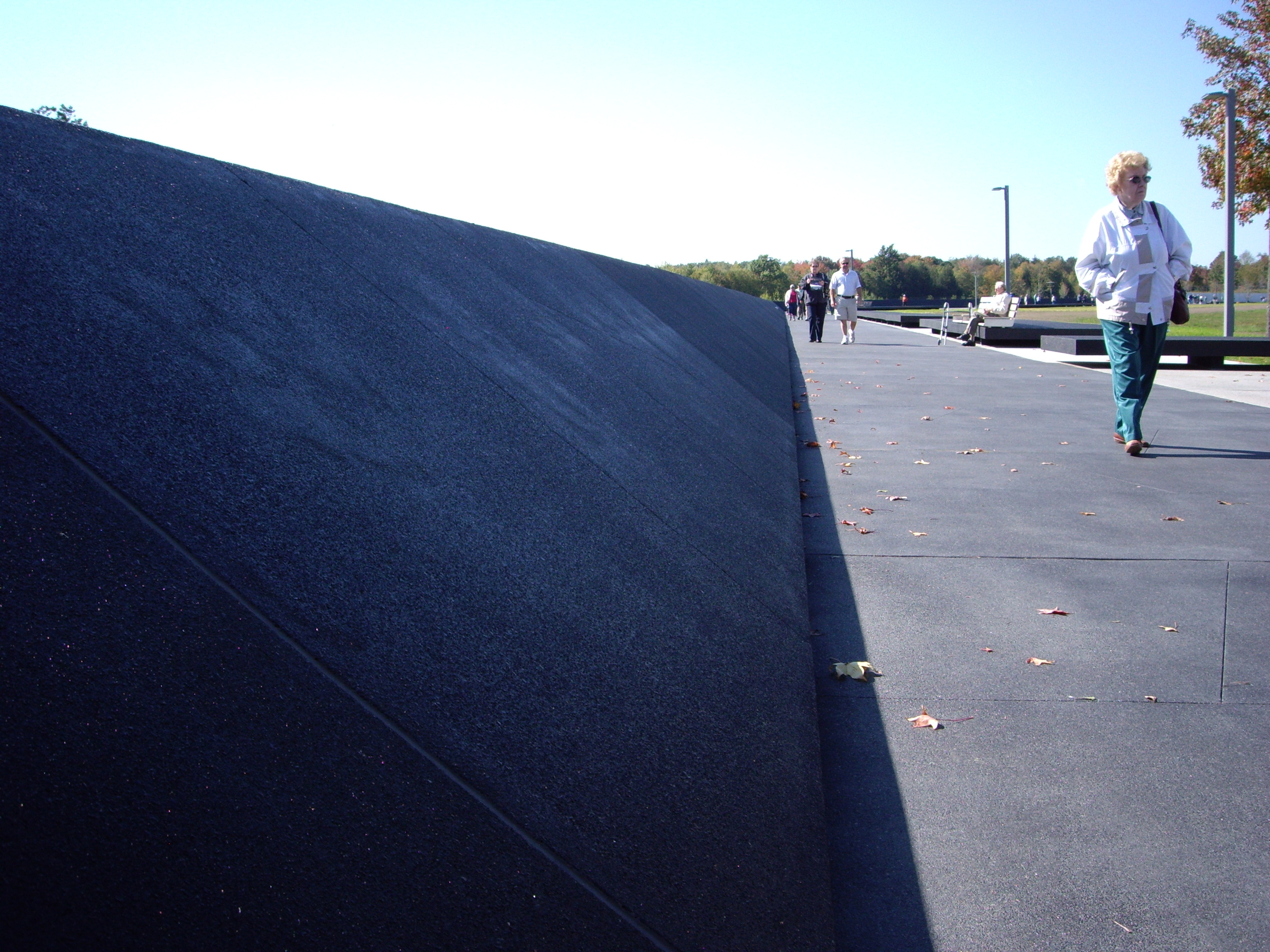
The wall marking the northern edge of the crash site at the Flight 93 National Memorial

The cost of the permanent memorial is estimated at $60 million. As of March 2011, $20 million in private donations had been raised, the Commonwealth of Pennsylvania was providing $18.5 million, and Congress had appropriated $10 million; the families of the victims of Flight 93 urged Congress to appropriate $3.7 million more in the fiscal year 2012 budget. The permanent memorial was originally planned for dedication on September 11, 2011; however, the pace of construction was delayed due to, among other factors, shortage of funding and the general economic downturn in America.

Ground was broken on November 8, 2009, at a ceremony led by Secretary of the Interior Ken Salazar and attended by Governor Ed Rendell, Senator Bob Casey, and Representatives John Murtha and Bill Shuster, as well as National Park officials, first responders, and family members of the passengers. The Wall of Names was completed in 2011.

==== Phase 2: Tower of Voices ====
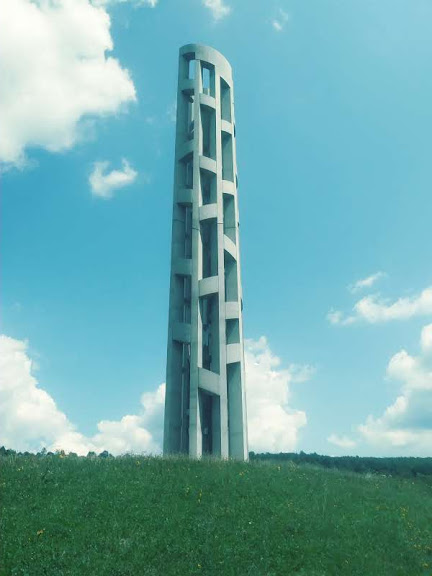
Tower of Voices, 93-foot tall tower built to commemorate the 40 passengers with one wind chime for each

In 2017, construction of a 93 ft (28 m)-tall monumental "Tower of Voices" began. The tower contains 40 wind chimes – one for each passenger and crew member who died in the crash, but none for the terrorists as they were responsible for the hijacking. The tower forms the gateway to the National Memorial and is visible from U.S. Route 30. The largest such structure ever built, the precast concrete tower supports polished aluminum chimes varying in length from 5 feet (1.5 m) to 10 feet (3.0 m) and varying tonalities (voices). The tower, built from 274 short tons (249 t) of concrete and steel, was constructed by L.S. Fiore. The pitch of the chimes was conceived by composer Samuel Pellman and constructed by a wind engineering consultant, an acoustics engineer, and a musical instruments fabricator. Prototypes were tested in Simi Valley, California, Morton, Illinois, and the desert in Arizona – sites with similar wind conditions as the memorial, which is located in an area of relatively high average wind speeds and has wind farms nearby.

Construction of the main tower was completed in 2018 and eight of the forty wind chimes were installed. In September 2020, the remaining wind chimes were installed by ARCH Production & Design NYC along with the mechanism that allows them to ring.

=== Dedication ===
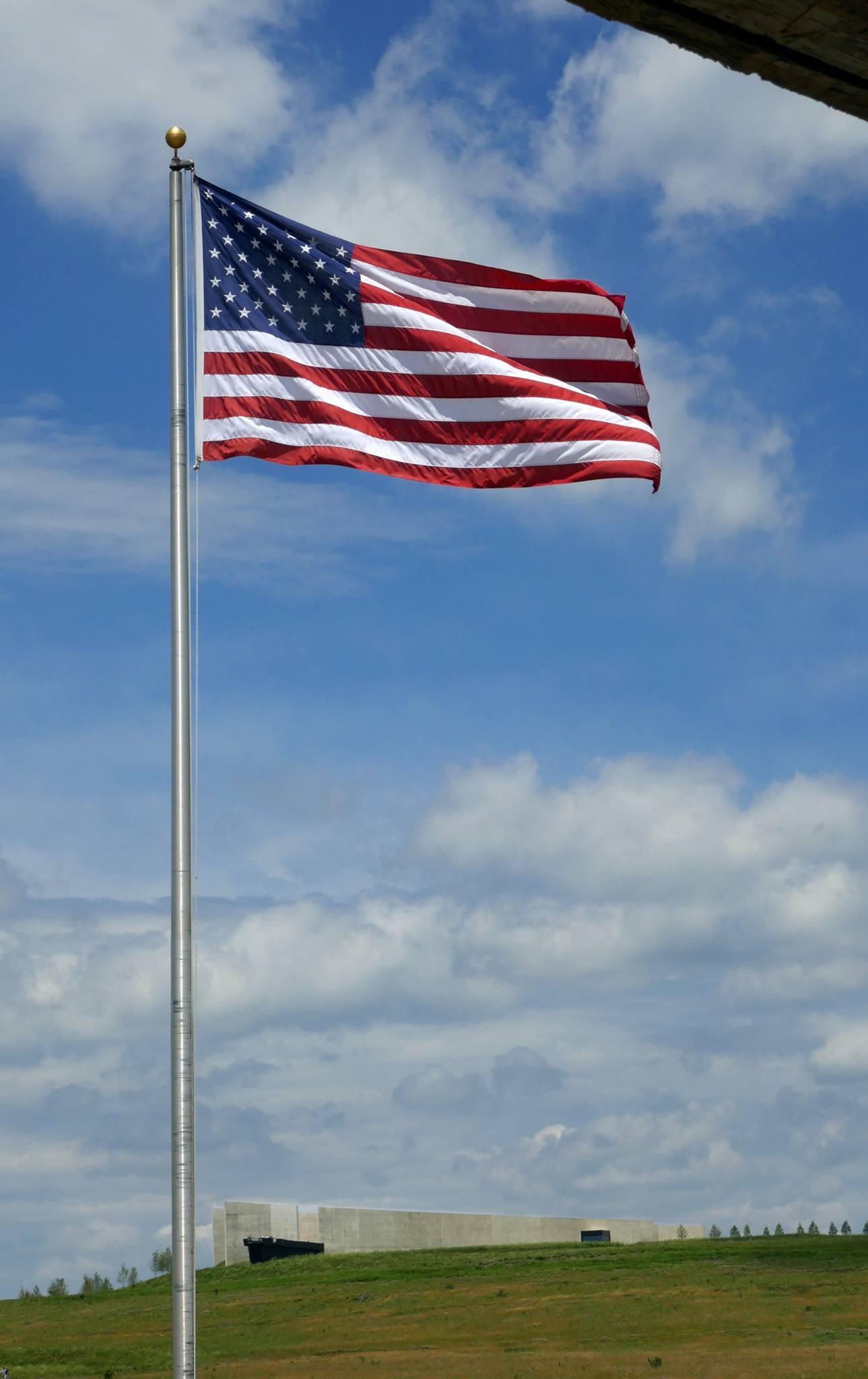
Flag flying over memorial plaza, with Flight 93 National Memorial visitor center in background

The first phase of the memorial was dedicated on September 10, 2011, at a public ceremony attended by Vice President Joe Biden, former presidents George W. Bush and Bill Clinton, Speaker of the House John Boehner, other dignitaries and family members of the passengers, and thousands of others. During the ceremony, Clinton announced that he and Boehner would launch a fundraising effort to raise the $10 million required to complete the memorial. Singer/songwriter Sarah McLachlan performed both "Angel" and "I Will Remember You" at the dedication ceremony. The Bells of Remembrance were tolled 40 times, once for each of the passengers and crew as their names were read, a tradition from the annual September 11 observance.

The Tower of Voices was dedicated on September 9, 2018.

On June 21, 2018, all recovered wreckage from the hijacked Boeing 757 was transported via shipping containers to the crash site where the 757 was buried in a private ceremony for the first responders to the crash, as well as families of the passengers and crew.

=== The Resiliency Project ===
The Memorial Groves at the memorial have suffered significant tree loss and poor health due to inadequate soil preparation, lack of irrigation, and challenging environmental conditions since their planting between 2012 and 2016. More than half of the trees show signs of decline or death. In response to this, the National Park Service, alongside the private Friends of Flight 93 National Memorial organization, have developed a resiliency plan to help replace dead and diseased trees. The program is planned to run from 2024 to 2029. Trees considered to be more hardy, such as red maple, hackberry, Kentucky coffee tree, sweetgum, swamp white oak, and pin oak, will be planted to replace the dead and diseased trees.

== See also ==
- U.S. Route 219 in Pennsylvania – a portion of this highway, running close to the crash site, was co-signed as the Flight 93 Memorial Highway in 2007.
- National September 11 Memorial & Museum
- September 11th National Memorial Trail
- Pentagon Memorial
- Victims of Terrorist Attack on the Pentagon Memorial
- List of national memorials of the United States
