= The Boat (short story collection) =

2008 short story collection by Nam Le

- Language: English
- Genre: Short Stories
- Publisher: Alfred A. Knopf (US)
- Publication date: May 13, 2008
- Publication place: Australia
- Media type: Print (hardback & paperback)
- Pages: 228
- ISBN: 978-0307268082
- OCLC: 213382533

The Boat is a 2008 collection of short stories by the Vietnamese-Australian writer Nam Le. It contains seven short stories taking place all over the world, from Colombia and the United States to Vietnam, Tehran, Australia and Hiroshima. It was praised by critics, and the Australian writer of short stories Cate Kennedy said that the collection brought the short story back to the "literary centre stage".

== Reception ==
In 2022, The Boat was included on the "Big Jubilee Read" list of 70 books by Commonwealth authors, selected to celebrate the Platinum Jubilee of Elizabeth II.
