= Pink Mountain on Locust Island =

2018 novel by Jamie Marina Lau

- Author: Jamie Marina Lau
- Genre: Fiction
- Publisher: Brow Books
- Publication date: 3 April 2018
- Publication place: Australia
- Pages: 208
- ISBN: 9780994606884

Pink Mountain on Locust Island is a 2018 novel by Jamie Marina Lau. The novel follows a 15-year-old girl named Monk living in Chinatown of an unnamed city with her father. Monk meets a 19-year-old art student named Santa Coy and is drawn into his world of art, crime and drugs. The novel was shortlisted for several awards, including the 2019 Stella Prize and ALS Gold Medal.

== Publication history ==
Pink Mountain on Locust Island was first published by Brow Books, the publishing arm of The Lifted Brow, in 2018 (ISBN 9780994606884). After Brow Books entered hiatus in 2020, the novel was picked up by Hachette Australia, which published the novel on 28 April 2021 (ISBN 9780733647161). The novel was published in the United States by Coffee House Press on 8 September 2020 (ISBN 9781566895941).

== Reception ==
Pink Mountain on Locust Island received generally positive reviews. In a review in The Australian, Thuy On wrote that the novel was "patchy", praising its experimental prose and structure but noting that parts of the novel lacked substance. A review in Kirkus Reviews concurred, describing the novel as "hypnotizing and inscrutable" while noting that the prose was occasionally so dense that its meaning became obscured. A review in Publishers Weekly praised the novel's "fragmented noir aesthetic" and described the work as a perceptive debut.

== Awards ==
Awards for Pink Mountain on Locust Island
Year	Award	Category	Result	Ref.
2019	Stella Prize	—	Shortlisted	
2019	New South Wales Premier's Literary Awards	UTS Glenda Adams Award for New Writing	Shortlisted	
2019	ALS Gold Medal	—	Shortlisted	
2018	Readings Prize	New Australian Fiction Prize	Shortlisted	
