= Stonycreek Township, Somerset County, Pennsylvania =

Township in Pennsylvania, US

Stonycreek Township
- Township
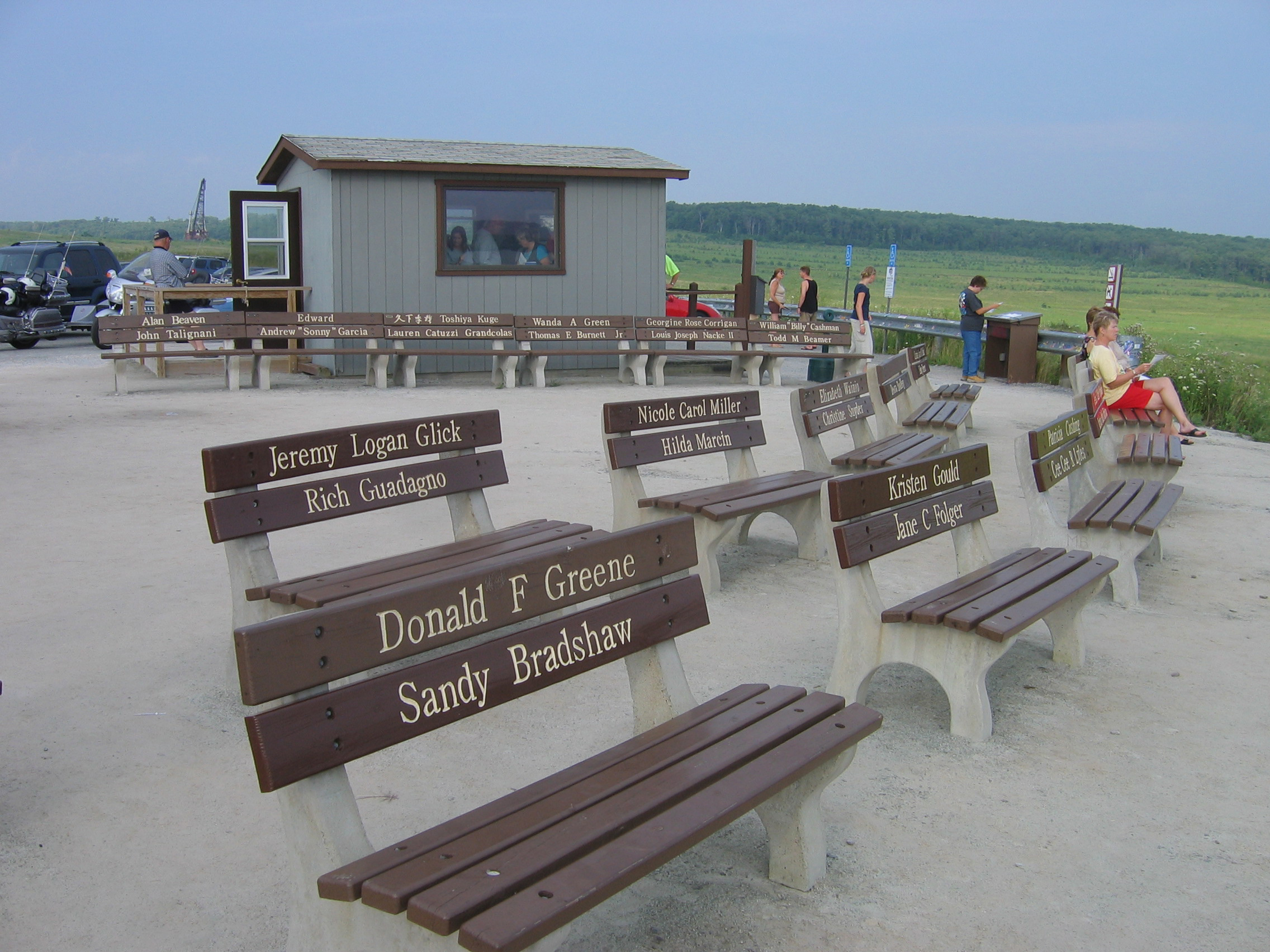
- The temporary Flight 93 National Memorial

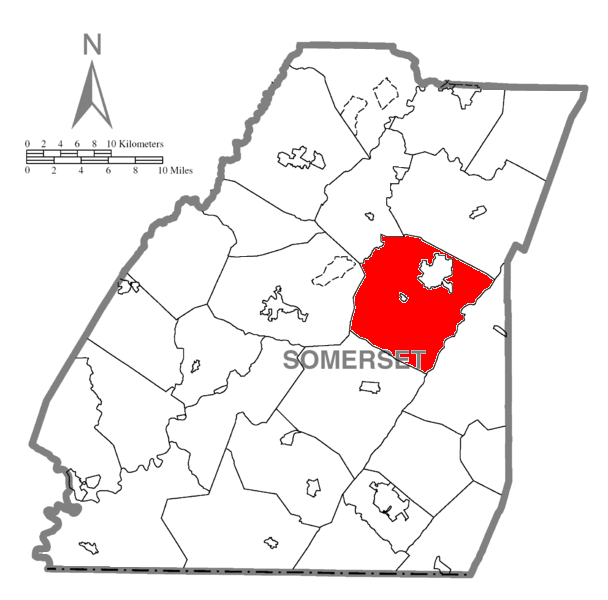
- Location of Stonycreek Township in Somerset County, Pennsylvania

- Location of Somerset County in Pennsylvania
- Country: United States
- State: Pennsylvania
- County: Somerset

Area
  - Total: 61.40 sq mi (159.02 km^{2})
  - Land: 61.13 sq mi (158.33 km^{2})
  - Water: 0.27 sq mi (0.69 km^{2})

Population (2020)
  - Total: 2,087
  - Estimate (2022): 2,066
  - Density: 34.1/sq mi (13.18/km^{2})
- Time zone: UTC-5 (Eastern (EST))
  - Summer (DST): UTC-4 (EDT)
- FIPS code: 42-111-74440

Stonycreek Township is a township in Somerset County, Pennsylvania, United States. The population was 2,087 at the 2020 census.

Stonycreek Township garnered global attention during the September 11 attacks, when United Airlines Flight 93, intended to likely strike either the United States Capitol or the White House in Washington, D.C., crashed there in a field, after civilian passengers and crew members on the flight from Newark, New Jersey, to San Francisco International Airport rebelled against the flight's al-Qaeda terrorist hijackers.

== History ==
What is now Stonycreek Township was settled in 1762. Most old records call it Stony Creek. The township takes its name from the stony creek, which flows through it and represents its western boundary. The stream takes its name from the rocky bed over which it flows for a great part of its course. Its Native American name was Sinne-Hanne or Achsin-Hanne. Hanne means a stream and especially a swift mountain stream. The township was incorporated in 1792 from portions of Quemahoning Township as the last of the six original townships of Somerset County.

Glessner Bridge was added to the National Register of Historic Places in 1980.

=== September 11 attacks ===
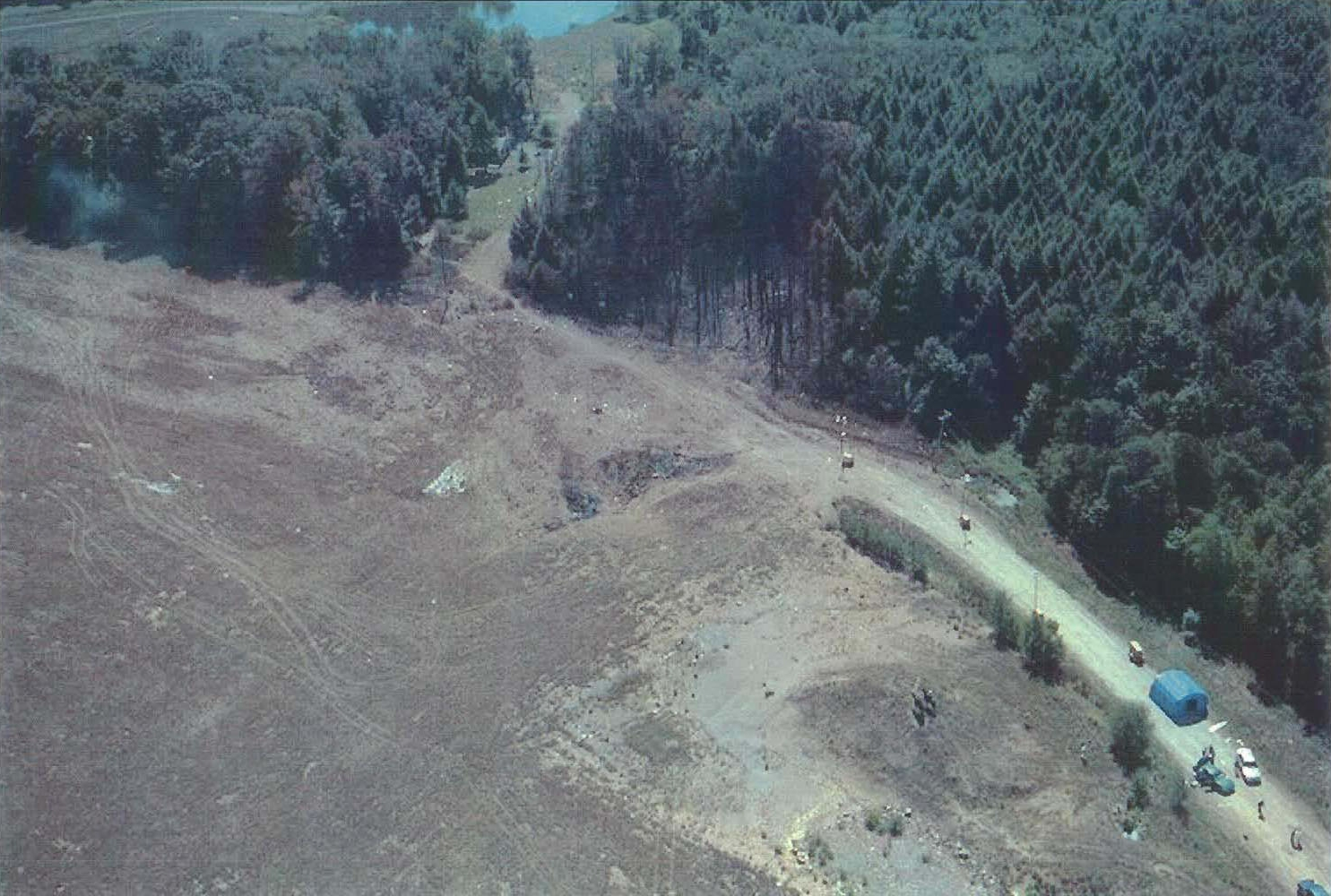
The September 11 crash site of Flight 93

Stonycreek Township gained global attention on September 11, 2001, when United Airlines Flight 93 crashed there. Flight 93 was one of four airliners hijacked that day as part of the Al-Qaeda terrorist attack on the United States. It is widely held that the Flight 93 hijackers intended to use the craft to likely strike either the United States Capitol or the White House. The crash occurred when the passengers tried to overpower the hijackers and seize control of the aircraft, prompting the terrorists to deliberately crash it rather than lose their advantage. The passengers learned of the plane's intended fate through cell phone calls to and from family members. All 44 people aboard the plane (including the four hijackers) were dead on impact. The site is now the location of a national memorial honoring the passengers and crew.

=== Flight 93 National Memorial ===
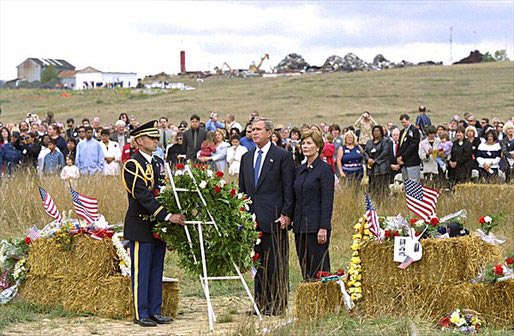
George W. Bush and Laura Bush visiting Stonycreek Township on September 11, 2002, the first anniversary of the attacks

The original temporary memorial to the passengers and crew of Flight 93 was located on a hill, about 500 yards (0.46 km) from the crash site. On July 8, 2010, a new temporary entrance and memorial were opened at an area called "The Western Overlook". It is where the FBI set up their command center and where family members first saw the aftermath of the crash, bringing their own memorials, where visitors can leave them today. The initial phase of permanent construction of the Flight 93 National Memorial, including the visitor center, was to be completed by the 10th anniversary in 2011. The first phase of the permanent memorial was completed, opened, and dedicated on September 10, 2011. The current design for the memorial is a modified version of the entry Crescent of Embrace by Paul and Milena Murdoch. The memorial was built around the crash site, following the plane's flight path, and protects the area of impact, known as the "Sacred Ground", which will remain protected and accessible only to family members of the passengers and crew.

== Geography ==
Stonycreek Township is located approximately at 40.01°N by 78.88°W, about 3 miles (4.8 km) west-southwest of Indian Lake, Pennsylvania. According to the U.S. Census Bureau, the township has a total area of 61.4 square miles (159.0 km^{2}), of which 61.1 square miles (158.3 km^{2}) is land and 0.3 square miles (0.7 km^{2}) (0.44%) is water. It is bordered to the northeast by Shade Township, to the northwest by Quemahoning Township, to the west by Somerset Township, to the southwest by Brothersvalley Township, and to the east by Allegheny Township. Pennsylvania Route 31 runs along the township's southwestern border with Brothersvalley Township and passes into Allegheny Township to the east. U.S. Route 30 / the Lincoln Highway runs along the township's northeastern border with Shade Township. Pennsylvania Route 160 passes through Stonycreek Township as it heads northeast from Brothersvalley Township to Shade Township. Route 160 and Route 31 intersect in Roxbury, and Route 160 and U.S. Route 30/Lincoln Highway intersect in Reels Corner.

== Demographics ==
Historical population
Census	Pop.	Note	%±
2000	2,221		—
2010	2,237		0.7%
2020	2,087		−6.7%
2022 (est.)	2,066		−1.0%
U.S. Decennial Census

As of the 2020 census, of 2000, there were 2,221 people, 820 households, and 634 families residing in the township. The population density was 36.3 inhabitants per square mile (14.0/km^{2}). There were 1,033 housing units at an average density of 16.9/sq mi (6.5/km^{2}). The racial makeup of the township was 98.96% White, 0.09% African American, 0.32% Native American, 0.14% Asian, 0.05% from other races, and 0.45% from two or more races. Hispanic or Latino of any race were 0.23% of the population.

There were 820 households, out of which 35.5% had children under the age of 18 living with them, 68.3% were married couples living together, 5.9% had a female householder with no husband present, and 22.6% were non-families. 18.2% of all households were made up of individuals, and 8.2% had someone living alone who was 65 years of age or older. The average household size was 2.71 and the average family size was 3.10.

In the township, the population was spread out, with 26.5% under the age of 18, 6.5% from 18 to 24, 29.4% from 25 to 44, 25.3% from 45 to 64, and 12.2% who were 65 years of age or older. The median age was 38 years. For every 100 females, there were 100.1 males. For every 100 females age 18 and over, there were 99.5 males.

The median income for a household in the township was $33,828, and the median income for a family was $38,418. Males had a median income of $30,236 versus $21,714 for females. The per capita income for the township was $14,463. About 9.6% of families and 10.8% of the population were below the poverty line, including 11.9% of those under age 18 and 3.9% of those age 65 or over.

== Education ==
Shanksville-Stonycreek School District is the local school district and operates area public schools.

== See also ==
- Traumascapes
