= Maria Tumarkin =

Australian cultural historian and writer

- Born: Kharkov, Ukrainian SSR, Soviet Union
- Education: University of Melbourne
- Occupations: Author, cultural historian
- Employer: University of Melbourne
- Notable work: Axiomatic
- Awards: Windham-Campbell Literature Prize

Maria Tumarkin is an Australian cultural historian, essayist and novelist, and is as of 2019 senior lecturer in the School of Culture and Communication at the University of Melbourne, teaching creative writing.

== Early life and education ==
Tumarkin was born and raised in Kharkov, then part of the Soviet Union, now in Ukraine. She left her home country in 1989 when she was a teenager, before the dissolution of the Soviet Union in 1991.

She holds a Bachelor of Arts and a PhD in cultural history from the University of Melbourne. Her PhD was titled "Secret Life of Wounded Spaces: Traumascapes in the contemporary Australia".

== Writing ==
She writes books of ideas, reviews, essays and pieces for performance.

== Academia and projects ==
She was an Honorary Artistic Outreach Associate (2015–2016) at the ARC Centre of Excellence for the History of Emotions and a co-creator, with Moya McFadzean, of "The Unending Absence" project.

As of 2021 Tumarkin taught creative writing at the School of Culture and Communication at the University of Melbourne.

== Works ==
=== Books ===
- Traumascapes: The Power and Fate of Places Transformed by Tragedy (2005)
- Courage (2007)
- Otherland: A Journey With My Daughter (2010)
- Axiomatic (2018)

=== Essays (selected) ===
- This Narrated Life (Griffith Review, 1 May 2014)
- No Skin (2 September 2015)
- Against Motherhood (20 October 2018)

== Awards ==
- Otherland was shortlisted for the Victorian Premier's Literary Awards, The Age Book of the Year, and New South Wales Premier's Literary Awards.
- "No Skin" was one of five finalists in the 2015 Melbourne Prize for Literature category for essays shorter than 20,000 words
- Axiomatic won the 2018 Melbourne Prize for Best Writing and was shortlisted for the 2019 Victorian Premier's Prize for Nonfiction. It was also shortlisted for the 2019 Stella Prize. and the 2019 NSW Premier's Literary Awards, Douglas Stewart Prize for Non-Fiction.
- Winner of the 2020 Windham-Campbell Literature Prize
