= Thuy On =

Australian arts journalist, critic and poet

Thuy On is an Australian arts journalist, editor, critic and poet and the reviews editor for ArtsHub. On's second collection, Decadence, was published in July 2022, and longlisted for the 2023 Stella Prize. The Stella Prize judges described the collection as 'a thrilling and wry evisceration of poetry gatekeeping on this continent'.

On's debut, a collection of poetry called Turbulence, came out in 2020 and was released by University of Western Australia Publishing (UWAP). Jackie Smith wrote in Mascara Literary Review: 'The way these poems are crafted is beautiful yet incredibly respectful of the impact the subject's passing would have on friends, family members and even strangers'. On's third book, Essence, is planned to be published by UWAP in 2025.

On has written for publications including The Guardian, The Saturday Paper, The Australian, The Age/SMH, Sydney Review of Books, Books & Publishing and Australian Book Review. She was the Books Editor of The Big Issue.
