= List of works with different titles in the United Kingdom and United States =

This page lists works with different titles in the United Kingdom and United States. Categories of such works include co-editions of books and foreign releases of films. Unless otherwise noted, UK titles are also used in most other countries, with the exception of Canada. Not listed are minor changes due to American and British English spelling differences; for example, the American film Rumor Has It... is titled Rumour Has It... in the UK, and, atypically, in Canada as well.

Legend:

- An asterisk (*) indicates which of the two countries the work originated in. If a work originated in a third country, this is covered in the Notes column.
- [c] indicates cases where Canada follows UK usage.
- [a] indicates cases where Australia follows US usage.

== Film and television ==
Type of work	UK title	US title	Notes
Film	Bay of Blood	Twitch of the Death Nerve	
Film	Dracula	Horror of Dracula	
Film	The Satanic Rites of Dracula	Dracula and His Vampire Brides	
Film	Zombie Flesh Eaters	Zombie	
Film	Zombie Flesh Eaters 2	Zombie 2	
Film	Romulus V Remus: The First King	The First King: Birth of an Empire	
Film	Porridge	Doing Time	
Film	Pirates of the Caribbean: Salazar's Revenge	Pirates of the Caribbean: Dead Men Tell No Tales*	
Film	The 51st State*	Formula 51	Retitled Formula 51, the original title was seen as potentially offensive to American audiences. The expression 51st state, in this context, refers to perceived American influence over the United Kingdom.
Film	American Pie: Reunion	American Reunion*	Most recent movie in the American Pie series.
Film	American Pie: The Wedding	American Wedding*	Third movie in the American Pie series. Also American Pie 3 in some markets.
Film	Avengers Assemble	The Avengers*	To avoid confusion with The Avengers (TV series), as well as its film adaptation. Original title is used worldwide.
Film	Bad Neighbours	Neighbors*	To avoid confusion with the unrelated Australian soap opera Neighbours, due to its popularity in the UK.
Film	Bad Neighbours 2	Neighbors 2: Sorority Rising*	To avoid confusion with the unrelated Australian soap opera Neighbours, due to its popularity in the UK.
Film	World Invasion: Battle Los Angeles	Battle: Los Angeles* [a]	
Film	Blueberry	Renegade	Original French title Blueberry: L'expérience secrète
TV series	Born Survivor: Bear Grylls*	Man vs. Wild [a]	
Film	Bonnie and Clyde...Were Killers!	Bonnie and Clyde*	Descriptive term added in order to clarify the subject of the film to those who would not be familiar with the American couple, Bonnie and Clyde.
TV series	Boss Cat	Top Cat* [a]	Name changed to avoid confusion with the name of a British cat food of the time.
Film	A Cock and Bull Story*	Tristram Shandy: A Cock and Bull Story	
Film	Airport '80: The Concorde	The Concorde ... Airport '79*	Title matches year of initial release in each country
TV series	Danger Man*	Secret Agent	The US used the original title for the first series.
Film	Dennis	Dennis the Menace* [a]	To avoid confusion with the unrelated British character Dennis the Menace.
Film	Escape to Victory*	Victory	Title shortened for U.S. release; many Sylvester Stallone movies had one-word titles.
Film	Europa	Zentropa	Name changed to avoid confusion with Europa Europa.
Film	Fast & Furious 5: Rio Heist	Fast Five*	Name changed to avoid confusion with the Kung Fu Panda franchise, which uses the term "Furious Five". Also Fast & Furious 5 in some markets.
TV series	The Fast Show*	Brilliant	Avoid confusion with unrelated US series The Fast Show.
Film	Fast & Furious 8	The Fate of the Furious*	Eighth movie in The Fast and the Furious franchise.
Film	The Killing Touch	Fatal Games*	(also known as Olympic Nightmare)
Film	The First Great Train Robbery	The Great Train Robbery*	Based on The Great Train Robbery by Michael Crichton, unconnected to the 1963 heist known by that name in the UK.
Film	Le Mans '66	Ford v Ferrari* [a]	Director James Mangold stated that European countries, including the UK, prohibit titles that consist of brand names.
Film	The Lion King 3: Hakuna Matata	The Lion King 1½*	Many other countries follow UK usage.
Film	Harold & Kumar Get the Munchies	Harold & Kumar Go to White Castle* [a]	White Castle restaurants does not trade in the UK.
Film	Bigfoot and the Hendersons	Harry and the Hendersons*	
Film	Highlander III: The Sorcerer*	Highlander: The Final Dimension	Also Highlander 3: The Final Conflict in some markets.
Film	Best Shot	Hoosiers*	Term "Hoosier" is a demonym for residents of the State of Indiana and is generally unknown outside the US.
Film	Howard... A New Breed of Hero	Howard the Duck*	Based on the comic Howard the Duck
Film	Hummingbird*	Redemption	
TV series	The Good Life*	Good Neighbors	To avoid confusion with the unrelated US series The Good Life.
TV series	Grace & Favour*	Are You Being Served? Again!	The expression "grace and favour" is rarely used in American English. The changed title also made the connection to the previous series more explicit.
Film	The Green Ray	Summer	Original French title Le rayon vert
Film	Hardcover	I, Madman*	
Film	Ice Cold in Alex*	Desert Attack	Allusions in original title deemed obscure for US audiences
Film	Inside I'm Dancing	Rory O'Shea Was Here	Original Irish title Inside I'm Dancing.
TV series	Jam & Jerusalem*	Clatterford	Some American audiences would not be familiar with the Women's Institute's traditional association with jam-making and the hymn "Jerusalem" since the noun Jerusalem would conjure a reference as the Middle Eastern city of Jerusalem rather than the unfamiliar hymn of the same name.
Film	Last Year in Marienbad	Last Year at Marienbad	French title L'année dernière à Marienbad; "à" may be translated as "in" or "at", but "in" is correct in reference to a town.
Film	La Haine [c]	Hate	UK retained original French title. American video release translated it.
Film	Bicycle Thieves	The Bicycle Thief	Original Italian title Ladri di biciclette. The UK title is the correct translation of the Italian.
Film	Léon: The Professional [c]	The Professional	Original French title Léon
Film	Unleashed	Danny The Dog	https://www.imdb.com/title/tt0342258/
Film	The Boat That Rocked	Pirate Radio	www.imdb.com/title/tt1131729/
Film	Hero	Accidental Hero	https://www.imdb.com/title/tt0104412/
Film	Diabolique	The Fiends	Original French title Les Diaboliques
Film	Belleville Rendez-vous	The Triplets of Belleville	Original French title Les Triplettes de Belleville
Film	Monsieur Hulot's Holiday	Mr. Hulot's Holiday	Original French title Les Vacances de M. Hulot
Film	Die Hard 4.0	Live Free or Die Hard*	"Live Free or Die", the state motto of New Hampshire, is little known outside the US.
Film	Mad Max 2: The Road Warrior	The Road Warrior	Original Australian title Mad Max 2. The original Mad Max had only a limited release in the US; the original title would have discouraged those who had not seen the original.
Film	In Bed With Madonna	Madonna: Truth or Dare*	
Film	The Untamed	Return to Snowy River	Original Australian title The Man from Snowy River II.
Film	Mission Without Permission*	Catch That Kid	
Film	A Matter of Life and Death*	Stairway to Heaven	
Film	Build My Gallows High	Out of the Past*	Based on a novel called Build My Gallows High
Film	Patton: Lust for Glory	Patton*	
Film	Politically Correct Party Animals	PCU*	
Film	The Yellow Winton Flyer	The Reivers*	Title changed to avoid confusion between the Anglo-Scottish Reivers and the general term, "reiver".
TV series	Robin of Sherwood*	Robin Hood	
Film	Sabrina Fair	Sabrina* (1954)	Sabrina Fair was the title of the original play.
Film	Snoopy and Charlie Brown: The Peanuts Movie	The Peanuts Movie*	
TV series	Spooks*	MI-5	In British slang, "spooks" are spies; in the US "spook" is an offensive term for African Americans.
TV series	Teenage Mutant Hero Turtles	Teenage Mutant Ninja Turtles*	The BBC considered "Ninja" inappropriate for children. However, the more recent Channel 5 (UK) version used the word Ninja.
Film	One Wild Night	Career Opportunities*	
Film	It's My Life	My Life to Live	Original French title Vivre sa vie (English: To live one's life).
Film	Paying the Penalty	Underworld*	When originally submitted to the BBFC as Underworld, the film was rejected due to the sympathetic portrayal of a gangster. After cuts and a title change to The Penalty (to place emphasis on morality and that crime does not pay), it was rejected again. After further cuts, and a second title change to Paying the Penalty (made to further emphasise morality), it was passed.
Film	Waking Ned*	Waking Ned Devine	
Film	A New York Winter's Tale	Winter's Tale*	
Film	Witchfinder General*	The Conqueror Worm	Lead Vincent Price had starred in several Edgar Allan Poe adaptations. This film has almost no connection to Poe's The Conqueror Worm.
Film	Happy Endings	Winter Passing*	
Film	WΔZ*	The Killing Gene	The original title is part of a scientific equation, pronounced double-yoo delta zed.
Film	xXx 2: The Next Level	xXx: State of the Union*	Some non-Americans would be less familiar with the State of the Union Address.
Film	Young Man of Music	Young Man with a Horn*	To avoid association with "horn" as a euphemism for "erection".
Film	Welcome to the Jungle	The Rundown*	
Film	Road Kill	Road Kill	Road Train is the original Australian film title
Film	Roadkill	Joy Ride*	
Film	Big Tits Zombie	The Big Tits Dragon*	The original Japanese title Kyonyû doragon: Onsen zonbi vs sutorippâ 5 roughly translates to The Big Tits Dragon: Hot Spring Zombies vs Strippers 5. The title was shortened for the US market, however the UK title was changed as it was deemed to better reflect the content of the film since Tit(s) meant various species of small bird of the genus Parus and a slang term for an idiot.
Film	Zootropolis	Zootopia* [a]	Disney explained the reason to change the film title, "to merely allow the film to have a unique title that works for UK audiences." Due to this, all lines with the word Zootopia were reshot to change it to Zootropolis and several scenes had to be reshot for the same reason.
Film	Xerxes	300: Rise of an Empire*	Xerxes was the title of the graphic novel on which this, the second movie in the 300 franchise, is based.
Film	Fast and Furious 7	Furious 7*	Seventh movie in The Fast and the Furious franchise.
TV special	The Little Christmas Burro	The Little Brown Burro	UK title was the original Canadian title of the special.
Film	Meet Whiplash Willie	The Fortune Cookie* [a]	At the time of the movie's release, Chinese restaurants were scarce in the UK.
Film	The Pirates! In an Adventure with Scientists!*	The Pirates! Band of Misfits [a]	New Zealand also uses the US title.
Film	Cone of Silence*	Trouble in the Sky	
TV series	Tropical Heat	Sweating Bullets	U.K. title was original Canadian title.
Film	Fast & Furious 9	F9: The Fast Saga*	Tenth movie in the Fast and Furious franchise.
Film	Baltimore	Rose's War	
Film	The Card*	The Promoter	Based on the book of the same name by Arnold Bennett.
TV series	Batman of the Future	Batman Beyond*	
TV series	The Smoggies	Stop the Smoggies!	UK title was original Canadian title, except in Quebec where it was titled Touftoufs et Polluards ("Suntots and Smoggies"). Retitled SOS Polluards in France.
Film	Hostile Hostages	The Ref*	

== Games ==
Type of work	UK title	US title	Notes
Video game	Another World	Out of This World	A French-made game. Renamed Out of This World to avoid confusion with unrelated TV series Another World. Also named Outer World in other markets.
Video game	Barbarian: The Ultimate Warrior*	Death Sword	
Video game	Barbarian II: The Dungeon of Drax*	Axe of Rage	
Video game	Beat the Beat: Rhythm Paradise	Rhythm Heaven Fever	
Video game	Broken Sword: The Shadow of the Templars*	Circle of Blood	
Video game	Shinobi X	Shinobi Legions	Called Shin Shinobi Den in Japan.
Video game	Canis Canem Edit	Bully*	A Canadian game. UK censors found Bully unacceptable, although the re-released title of Bully: Scholarship Edition was not changed. The UK title is Latin for "Dog eat dog", which is the motto of Bullworth Academy, the school featured in the game.
Video game	Castlevania: The New Generation	Castlevania: Bloodlines	
Video game	Soleil	Crusader of Centy	
Board game	Cluedo*	Clue	The original name is a pun on Ludo, which, in the US, is less known than the similar Parcheesi.
Video game	Dark Chronicle	Dark Cloud 2	
Video game	Donkey Kong Jet Race	Donkey Kong Barrel Blast	
Video game	Dr. Kawashima's Brain Training: How Old Is Your Brain?	Brain Age: Train Your Brain in Minutes a Day!	
Video game	Dr. Kawashima's Devilish Brain Training: Can You Stay Focused?	Brain Age: Concentration Training	
Video game	Euro Football Champ	Super Soccer Champ	
Video game	Exhaust Heat	F1 ROC: Race of Champions	
Video game	Fahrenheit	Indigo Prophecy	
Video game	Fatal Racing	Whiplash	
Video game	Fever Pitch Soccer*	Head-On Soccer	
Video game	Flashback	Flashback: The Quest for Identity	
Video game	Illusion of Time	Illusion of Gaia	The original Japanese title is Gaia Gensouki. This creates an error in the developer's room of the PAL-only sequel Terranigma, where the developer refers to Terranigma as Illusion of Gaia 2. This would have made sense in that game's scrapped American localization.
Video game	Jak II: Renegade	Jak II	
Video game	Jet Set Radio	Jet Grind Radio	
Video game	Kirby Mouse Attack	Kirby: Squeak Squad	
Video game	Kirby and the Rainbow Paintbrush	Kirby and the Rainbow Curse	
Video game	Kirby: Power Paintbrush	Kirby: Canvas Curse	
Video game	Kirby's Adventure Wii	Kirby's Return to Dream Land	
Video game	Kirby's Fun Pak	Kirby Super Star	Kirby Super Star Ultra, the remake of this game, retains the same name in all regions.
Video game	Kula World	Roll Away	
Video game	Luigi's Mansion 2	Luigi's Mansion: Dark Moon	
Video game	Lylat Wars	Star Fox 64	The title was changed due to the same trademark issues as the original game Starwing (US title Star Fox; see below). The game was originally released in 1997, however the series' publisher Nintendo had since settled all related trademark issues, and consequently had the similarly named 2011 remake Star Fox 64 3D retains the same title in all regions.
Video game	Mario & Luigi: Paper Jam Bros.	Mario & Luigi: Paper Jam	Japanese title is Mario & Luigi RPG: Paper Mario MIX.
Video game	Mario Smash Football	Super Mario Strikers	A Canadian-developed game.
Video game	Mario Strikers Charged Football	Mario Strikers Charged	The game is the sequel to Super Mario Strikers.
Video game	Mario Power Tennis	Mario Tennis: Power Tour [a]	Japanese title is Mario Tennis Advance.
Video game	More Brain Training from Dr. Kawashima: How Old Is Your Brain??	Brain Age 2: More Training in Minutes a Day!	
Video game	Music 2000*	MTV Music Generator	
Video game	Mystic Quest	Final Fantasy Adventure	Original Japanese title was Seiken Densetsu: Final Fantasy Gaiden.
Video games	Mystic Quest Legend	Final Fantasy: Mystic Quest	
Video game	Need for Speed: Porsche 2000	Need for Speed: Porsche Unleashed	
Video game	Need for Speed: Road Challenge	Need for Speed: High Stakes	
Video game	Overboard!	Shipwreckers!	
Video game series	Probotector	Contra	The Wii U re-releases use the American names
Video game series	Pro Evolution Soccer	World Soccer: Winning Eleven	All releases after Pro Evolution Soccer 2008 have used the Pro Evolution Soccer title in the US.
Video game series	Project Zero	Fatal Frame	The European title is based on the original Japanese title Zero.
Video game	Professor Layton and Pandora's Box	Professor Layton and the Diabolical Box	The Professor Layton games originated in Japan, though they are set in the UK.
Video game	Professor Layton and the Lost Future	Professor Layton and the Unwound Future	The Professor Layton games originated in Japan, though they are set in the UK.
Video game	Professor Layton and the Spectre's Call	Professor Layton and the Last Specter	The Professor Layton games originated in Japan, though they are set in the UK.
Video game	Ratchet & Clank 2: Locked and Loaded	Ratchet & Clank: Going Commando*	
Video game	Ratchet & Clank 3	Ratchet & Clank: Up Your Arsenal*	
Video game	Ratchet: Gladiator	Ratchet: Deadlocked*	
Video game	Ratchet & Clank: Tools of Destruction	Ratchet & Clank Future: Tools of Destruction*	
Video game	Ratchet & Clank: Quest for Booty	Ratchet & Clank Future: Quest for Booty*	
Video game	Ratchet & Clank: A Crack in Time	Ratchet & Clank Future: A Crack in Time*	
Video game	Ratchet & Clank: QForce	Ratchet & Clank: Full Frontal Assault*	
Video game	Ratchet & Clank: Nexus	Ratchet & Clank: Into the Nexus*	
Video game	Rhythm Paradise	Rhythm Heaven	
Video game	Rhythm Paradise Megamix	Rhythm Heaven Megamix	
Video game	Shadow Warriors	Ninja Gaiden	NES version only. The Wii and later versions use the US title.
Video game	Shadow Warriors II: The Dark Sword of Chaos	Ninja Gaiden II: The Dark Sword of Chaos	NES version only. The Virtual Console versions use the US title.
Video game	Shadow Warriors	Ninja Gaiden Shadow	
Video game	Shin Megami Tensei: Lucifer's Call	Shin Megami Tensei: Nocturne	
Video game	Sly Raccoon	Sly Cooper and the Thievius Raccoonus*	
Video game	Spyro 2: Gateway to Glimmer	Spyro 2: Ripto's Rage!*	
Video game	Starwing	Star Fox	The title was changed so not to confuse this game with an older, unrelated game of the same name that was released on the Atari 2600. The defunct video game company Mythicon, developers of Star Fox on the Atari, had trademarked the name Star Fox in Europe, although the game was never released in Europe.
Video game	The Story of Thor	Beyond Oasis	
Video game	Street Gangs	River City Ransom	
Video game	Super Air Diver	Lock On	
Video game	Super Aleste	Space Megaforce	
Video game	Super Battletank	Garry Kitchen's Super Battletank: War in the Gulf	
Video game	Super Hockey	NHL Stanley Cup	
Video game	Super Pang	Super Buster Bros.	
Video game	Super Strike Gunner	Strike Gunner S.T.G	
Video game	Super SWIV	Firepower 2000	
Video game	Thunder Force IV	Lightening Force: Quest for the Darkstar	
Video game	TOCA 2 Touring Cars*	TOCA 2: Touring Car Challenge	
Video game	TOCA Race Driver*	Pro Race Driver	
Video game	TOCA Touring Car Championship*	TOCA Championship Racing	
Video game	TOCA World Touring Cars*	Jarrett & Labonte Stock Car Racing	
Video game	Tokyo Highway Challenge	Tokyo Xtreme Racer	Original Japanese title is Shutokō Battle.
Video game	Tony Hawk's Skateboarding	Tony Hawk's Pro Skater*	
Video game	Wario Land: The Shake Dimension	Wario Land: Shake It!	Original Japanese title is Wario Land Shake and Wario Land Shaking in South Korea.
Video game	WarioWare, Inc.: Minigame Mania	WarioWare, Inc.: Mega Microgames!*	
Video game	Wipeout 2097*	Wipeout XL	
Video game	Wip3out*	Wipeout 3	
Video game	Wiz 'n' Liz: The Frantic Wabbit Wescue*	Wiz 'n' Liz	
Video game	World Cup Italia '90	World Championship Soccer	
Video game	World League Basketball	NCAA Basketball	
Video game	Zombies	Zombies Ate My Neighbors*	

== Literature ==
Type of work	UK title	US title	Author	Notes
Autobiography	Cider with Rosie*	Edge of Day	Laurie Lee	
Autobiography	Memoir*	All Will Be Well	John McGahern	
Autobiographical	Over Seventy*	America, I Like You	P. G. Wodehouse	
Autobiographical	Performing Flea*	Author! Author!	P. G. Wodehouse	
Book series	Where's Wally?*	Where's Waldo?	Martin Handford	
Book	Down Under	In a Sunburned Country*	Bill Bryson	
Book	Notes from a Big Country* [c]	I'm a Stranger Here Myself: Notes on Returning to America After Twenty Years Away	Bill Bryson	
Collection of short stories	Blandings Castle and Elsewhere*	Blandings Castle	P. G. Wodehouse	
Collection of short stories	The Clicking of Cuthbert*	Golf Without Tears	P. G. Wodehouse	
Collection of short stories	The Great Automatic Grammatizator*	The Umbrella Man and Other Stories	Roald Dahl	
Collection of short stories	The Heart of a Goof*	Divots	P. G. Wodehouse	
Collection of short stories	Just Crazy!	Just Wacky!	Andy Griffiths	Originally published as Just Crazy in Australia.
Collection of short stories	Just Kidding!	Just Joking!	Andy Griffiths	Originally published as Just Tricking in Australia.
Collection of short stories	Little Mexican*	Young Archimedes	Aldous Huxley	
Collection of short stories	Lord Emsworth and Others*	Crime Wave at Blandings	P. G. Wodehouse	
Collection of short stories	Ukridge*	He Rather Enjoyed It	P. G. Wodehouse	
Comic strip	Orson's Farm	U.S. Acres*	Jim Davis	
Non-fiction	The Surgeon of Crowthorne*	The Professor and the Madman	Simon Winchester	
Novel series	The New Heroes*	Quantum Prophecy	Michael Carroll	Author is Irish.
Novel	Benjamin Dickenson Carr and His (George)	(George)*	E. L. Konigsburg	
Novel	4:50 from Paddington*	What Mrs. MacGillicuddy Saw! as well as Murder, She Said	Agatha Christie	
Novel	The Adventures of Sally*	Mostly Sally	P. G. Wodehouse	
Novel	After the Funeral*	Funerals are Fatal	Agatha Christie	
Novel	Anne of Windy Willows	Anne of Windy Poplars*	Lucy Maud Montgomery	The two editions are not exactly the same, as when the book was first published, the working title was Anne of Windy Willows, but Montgomery's publisher wanted to change it because of its purported similarity to Kenneth Grahame's novel The Wind in the Willows. The same publisher also requested some scenes to be cut out for perceived gory or horrifying content, to which Montgomery complied. Montgomery's UK publisher, however, did not see the need for any of these changes, and published the unedited book under the title Anne of Windy Willows. Author is Canadian.
Novel	Aunts Aren't Gentlemen*	The Cat-nappers	P. G. Wodehouse	
Novel	Awful End*	A House Called Awful End	Philip Ardagh	
Novel	Barmy in Wonderland*	Angel Cake	P. G. Wodehouse	
Novel	The Whale*	Moby-Dick; or, The Whale	Herman Melville	
Novel	Barry Trotter and the Shameless Parody*	Barry Trotter and the Unauthorized Parody	Michael Gerber	The book is a parody of Harry Potter and the Philosopher's Stone by J. K. Rowling.
Novel	Black Maria*	Aunt Maria	Diana Wynne Jones	
Novel	The Blue Boa*	Charlie Bone and the Invisible Boy	Jenny Nimmo	
Novel	The Castle of Mirrors*	Charlie Bone and the Castle of Mirrors	Jenny Nimmo	
Novel	Charlie Bone and the Shadow of Badlock*	Charlie Bone and the Shadow	Jenny Nimmo	
Novel	Charlie Bone and the Wilderness Wolf*	Charlie Bone and the Beast	Jenny Nimmo	
Novel	COLD*[c]	Cold Fall	John Gardner	The U.K. version was published in some British Commonwealth Nations. Editorial differences also exist between the U.S. and U.K. edition.
Novel	The Coming of Bill*	Their Mutual Child	P. G. Wodehouse	Also known as The White Hope.
Novel	Company for Henry*	The Purloined Paperweight	P. G. Wodehouse	
Novel	Daggie Dogfoot*	Pigs Might Fly	Ronald Gordon King-Smith, pen name "Dick King-Smith".	
Novel	I Am David	North to Freedom	Danish author Anne Holm	Originally published in Danish under the title David*. North to Freedom was the title the book was first published under in the United States; now there it is also published as I Am David.
Novel	Death and the Brewery Queen	Murder is in the Air	Frances Brody	
Novel	Death in the Clouds*	Death in the Air	Agatha Christie	
Novel	A Whiff of Death	The Death Dealers*	Isaac Asimov	
Novel	Destination Unknown*	So Many Steps to Death	Agatha Christie	
Novel	Dolly and the Cookie Bird*	Murder in the Round	Dorothy Dunnett	Renamed to avoid giving offence to US President's wife Ladybird Johnson. Reissued in UK as Ibiza Surprise.
Novel	Dolly and the Doctor Bird*	Match for a Murderer	Dorothy Dunnett	Renamed to avoid giving offence to US President's wife Ladybird Johnson. Reissued in UK as Operation Nassau.
Novel	Dolly and the Singing Bird*	The Photogenic Soprano	Dorothy Dunnett	Renamed to avoid giving offence to US President's wife Ladybird Johnson. Reissueed in UK as Rum Affair.
Novel	Dolly and the Starry Bird*	Murder in Focus	Dorothy Dunnett	Renamed to avoid giving offence to US President's wife Ladybird Johnson. Reissued in UK as Roman Nights.
Novel	Dumb Witness*	Poirot Loses a Client	Agatha Christie	
Novel	Emlyn's Moon*	Orchard of the Crescent Moon	Jenny Nimmo	Emlyn's Moon is the second book in The Magician Trilogy.
Novel	Five Little Pigs*	Murder in Retrospect	Agatha Christie	
Novel	Frozen Assets*	Biffen's Millions	P. G. Wodehouse	
Novel	Miss Smilla's Feeling for Snow	Smilla's Sense of Snow	Peter Høeg	Danish original: Frøken Smillas fornemmelse for sne. English translation by Tiina Nunnally. Filmed as Smilla's Sense of Snow.
Novel	Galahad at Blandings*	The Brinkmanship of Galahad Threepwood	P. G. Wodehouse	
Novel	A Gentleman of Leisure*	The Intrusion of Jimmy	P. G. Wodehouse	
Novel	Gideon the Cutpurse*	The Time Travelers	Linda Buckley-Archer	
Novel	The Girl on the Boat*	Three Men and a Maid	P. G. Wodehouse	
Novel	The Golden Fleece*	Hercules, My Shipmate	Robert Graves	
Novel and film	Harry Potter and the Philosopher's Stone* [c]	Harry Potter and the Sorcerer's Stone	J.K. Rowling	The American editor felt that the original title would be misinterpreted, as the legend of the Philosopher's stone and its links to alchemy are not widely known in United States.
Novel	Hickory Dickory Dock*	Hickory Dickory Death	Agatha Christie	
Novel	Temeraire	His Majesty's Dragon*	Naomi Novik	
Novel	Hercule Poirot's Christmas*	Murder for Christmas, as well as A Holiday for Murder	Agatha Christie	
Novel	The Hollow*	Murder After Hours	Agatha Christie	
Pseudohistory	The Holy Blood and the Holy Grail*	Holy Blood, Holy Grail	Michael Baigent, Richard Leigh and Henry Lincoln	
Novel	Ice in the Bedroom*	The Ice in the Bedroom	P. G. Wodehouse	
Novel	If You Could See Me Now*	A Silver Lining	Cecelia Ahern	
Novel	The Infernal Desire Machines of Doctor Hoffman*	The War of Dreams	Angela Carter	
Novel	The Inimitable Jeeves*	Jeeves	P. G. Wodehouse	
Novel	The Iron Man*	The Iron Giant	Ted Hughes	Title was changed to avoid trademark infringement with the comic book character Iron Man.
Novel	The Island of Adventure*	Mystery Island	Enid Blyton	The American title shown is from the 1945 edition. The Island of Adventure is the first in The Adventure Series.
Novel	Jeeves and the Feudal Spirit*	Bertie Wooster Sees It Through	P. G. Wodehouse	
Novel	Jeeves in the Offing*	How Right You Are, Jeeves	P. G. Wodehouse	
Novel	Jennifer, Hecate, Macbeth and Me	Jennifer, Hecate, Macbeth, William McKinley, and Me, Elizabeth*	E. L. Konigsburg	
Novel	Jill the Reckless*	The Little Warrior	P. G. Wodehouse	
Novel	Journey by First Class Camel	Journey to an 800 Number*	E. L. Konigsburg	
Novel	Joy in the Morning*	Jeeves in the Morning	P. G. Wodehouse	The American title shown here is from a later edition. Earlier American editions are titled Joy in the Morning.
Novel	Atomised	The Elementary Particles	Michel Houellebecq	Originally a French novel entitled Les Particules Élémentaires, which translates to the US title.
Novel	Good Wives	Little Women, Part II*	Louisa M. Alcott	
Novel	Lord Edgware Dies*	Thirteen at Dinner	Agatha Christie	
Novel	Madame Doubtfire*	Alias Madame Doubtfire	Anne Fine	
Novel	Marque and Reprisal*	Moving Target	Elizabeth Moon	
Novel	The Mirror Crack'd from Side to Side*	The Mirror Crack'd	Agatha Christie	
Novel	The More the Merrier*	The True Story of Winter	Anne Fine	
Novel	Moroccan Traffic*	Send a Fax to the Kasbah	Dorothy Dunnett	
Novel	The Moving Finger*	The Case of the Moving Finger	Agatha Christie	
Novel	Mrs McGinty's Dead*	Blood Will Tell	Agatha Christie	
Novel	Much Obliged, Jeeves*	Jeeves and the Tie That Binds	P. G. Wodehouse	
Novel	Murder is Easy*	Easy to Kill	Agatha Christie	
Novel	Murder on the Orient Express*	Murder in the Calais Coach	Agatha Christie	American title to avoid confusion with Graham Greene's novel Stamboul Train, which in the US had been published as Orient Express
Novel	The Nigger of the 'Narcissus': A Tale of the Sea* [c]	The Children of the Sea: A Tale of the Forecastle	Joseph Conrad	US publisher objected to "nigger". In 2009, the Dutch company WordBridge Publishing published a new edition titled The N-Word of the Narcissus
Novel	Non-Stop*	Starship	Brian Aldiss	The title change was presumably to sound more sci-fi-ish. The changed title gives away a plot point.
Novel	Northern Lights*	The Golden Compass	Philip Pullman	US publishers changed title due to vague resemblance of alethiometer on cover to a compass. The film version was titled The Golden Compass in different markets.
Novel	One, Two, Buckle My Shoe*	An Overdose of Death as well as The Patriotic Murders.	Agatha Christie	
Novel	Cross Stitch	Outlander*	Diana Gabaldon	
Novel	The Painted Man*	The Warded Man	Peter V. Brett	
Collection of short stories	Parker Pyne Investigates*	Mr Parker Pyne - Detective	Agatha Christie	
Novel	Pearls, Girls and Monty Bodkin*	The Plot That Thickened	P. G. Wodehouse	
Novel	A Pelican at Blandings*	No Nudes is Good Nudes	P. G. Wodehouse	
Novel	The Quantum Prophecy*	The Awakening	Michael Carroll	Author is Irish.
Novel	Two Hours to Doom*	Red Alert	Peter Bryan George, pen name "Peter Bryant"	The book was the basis for the film Dr. Strangelove.
Novel	Right Ho, Jeeves*	Brinkley Manor	P. G. Wodehouse	
Novel	Ring for Jeeves*	The Return of Jeeves	P. G. Wodehouse	
Novel	Sakkara*	Quantum Prophecy 2: The Gathering	Michael Carroll	Author is Irish.
Novel	Sam the Sudden*	Sam in the Suburbs	P. G. Wodehouse	
Novel	Shadow Dance*	Honeybuzzard	Angela Carter	
Novel	The Sheep-Pig* [c]	Babe The Gallant Pig	Ronald Gordon King-Smith, pen name "Dick King-Smith"	The corresponding film was titled Babe.
Novel	The Silver Sword*	Escape from Warsaw	Ian Serraillier	
Novel	The Sittaford Mystery*	The Murder at Hazelmoor	Agatha Christie	
Novel	Something Fishy*	The Butler Did It	P. G. Wodehouse	
Novel	Something Fresh*	Something New	P. G. Wodehouse	
Novel	Sparkling Cyanide*	Remembered Death	Agatha Christie	
Book series	Spook's	The Last Apprentice	Joseph Delaney	
Novel	Stamboul Train*	Orient Express	Graham Greene	
Novel	The Stars' Tennis Balls*	Revenge	Stephen Fry	
Novel	Summer Lightning*	Fish Preferred	P. G. Wodehouse	
Novel	Taken at the Flood*	There is a Tide	Agatha Christie	
Novel	Aunt Becky Began It	A Tangled Web*	L. M. Montgomery	
Novel	Ten Little Niggers*	And Then There Were None and Ten Little Indians	Agatha Christie	In America, first published as And Then There Were None with the nursery rhyme changed to Ten Little Indians; a later US edition under that title; from the 1960s most British editions as And Then There Were None with the nursery rhyme "Ten Little Soldier Boys".
Novel	Slave Girl	Rover	Australian author Jackie French	Originally published in Australia under the title They Came on Viking Ships.
Novel	They Do It With Mirrors*	Murder With Mirrors	Agatha Christie	
Collection of short stories	The Thirteen Problems*	The Tuesday Club Murders	Agatha Christie	
Novel	Three Act Tragedy*	Murder in Three Acts	Agatha Christie	
Novel	The Time Twister*	Charlie Bone and the Time Twister	Jenny Nimmo	
Novel	The Continuous Katherine Mortenhoe	The Unsleeping Eye*	David G. Compton	Filmed as Death Watch.
Novel	Tiger! Tiger!*	The Stars My Destination	Alfred Bester	
Novel	On Her Majesty's Wizardly Service	To Visit the Queen*	Diane Duane	
Novel	Twinkle, Twinkle, Little Spy*	Catch a Falling Spy	Len Deighton	
Novel	Where Rainbows End*	Love, Rosie, or Rosie Dunne	Cecelia Ahern	
Novel	Why Didn't They Ask Evans?*	The Boomerang Clue	Agatha Christie	
Novel	Wilkins' Tooth*	Witch's Business	Diana Wynne Jones	
Novel	The Seven Deaths of Evelyn Hardcastle*	The 7½ Deaths of Evelyn Hardcastle	Stuart Turton	
Non-fiction biography	The Sister: The extraordinary story of Kim Yo Jong, the most powerful woman in North Korea	The Sister: North Korea's Kim Yo Jong, the Most Dangerous Woman in the World	Sung-Yoon Lee	
Non-fiction history	Dominion: The Making of the Western Mind*	Dominion: How the Christian Revolution Remade the World	Tom Holland	
Novel	The Card*	Denry the Audacious	Arnold Bennett	Filmed as The Card (UK)/The Promoter (US)

== Music ==
Type of work	UK title	US title	Notes
Song	"9 to 5"*	"Morning Train (Nine to Five)"	Avoid confusion with the Dolly Parton song "9 to 5"
Album	Peter Gabriel* (1982)	Security	This was the fourth album released by Peter Gabriel with the name Peter Gabriel.
Album	The Electric Light Orchestra*	No Answer	The US title resulted from misunderstanding the note left by a United Artists Records employee who had tried to phone Harvest Records for the title but got no answer.
Album	Suede*	The London Suede	Eponymous debut album by the British rock group Suede. The group had to change their name for the American market due to a trademark owned by an American singer with the same name.
Album	Loud & Clear	All Night Long*	Live album by American singer Sammy Hagar originally released in 1978 in the US. Released in the UK in 1979 with a different title and cover.
Album	The Rolling Stones*	England's Newest Hit Makers	
Album	My Generation*	The Who Sings My Generation	
Album	A Quick One*	Happy Jack	The U.S. Decca label dropped the suggestive U.K. title and changed the track list to include hit song Happy Jack.
Album	Killing Machine*	Hell Bent for Leather	Title changed for US release as Columbia/CBS did not like the murderous implications of the album title.
Album	What Is Beat?*	What Is The English Beat?	The British band The Beat was known as The English Beat in North America due to a copyright issue.
Album	Kylie Minogue	Impossible Princess	Changed in the UK after the death of Diana, Princess of Wales. US title was the original Australian title.
Album	Club Classics Vol. One	Keep on Movin'*	Debut album of the British band Soul II Soul.
Album	Lost in Your Love	Love Is in the Air [a]	Retitled to avoid confusion with a greatest hits compilation by John Paul Young. US title was original Australian title.

== Other ==
Type of work	UK title	US title	Notes
Comic books	Teenage Mutant Hero Turtles	Teenage Mutant Ninja Turtles [a]	Former UK censorship. Also applied to the games based on it up to the 16-bit era.
Food	Marathon	Snickers	Standardised to Snickers name in 1990.
Games console	Mega Drive	Genesis	The name change appears to have been due to a trademark dispute.
Mock history	Drayneflete Revealed	There'll Always be a Drayneflete	US title echoes There'll Always Be an England
Toy franchise	Action Force	G.I. Joe*	Reworked the US military unit into an international band of soldiers.
