= Lyric Theatre (Hammersmith) =

Theatre in London, England

The Lyric Hammersmith Theatre

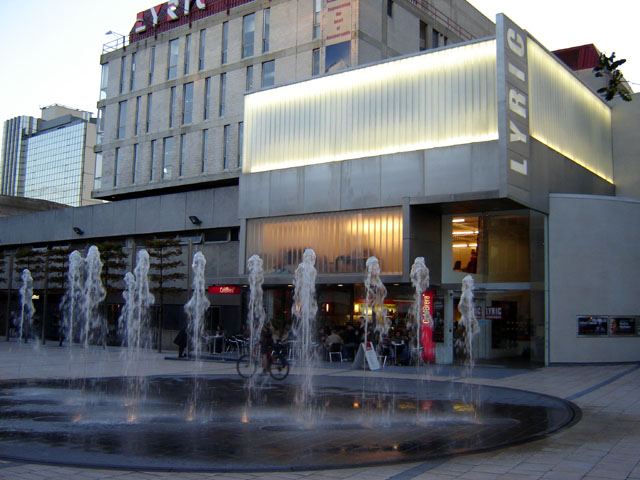
- Lyric Theatre, Hammersmith, 2009
- Interactive map of The Lyric Hammersmith Theatre
- Location: Hammersmith; London, W6; United Kingdom
- Coordinates: 51.49306°N 0.22639°W
- Owner: Lyric Theatre Hammersmith Ltd
- Capacity: 550 (main house); 110 (studio)
- Public transit: Hammersmith (District/Piccadilly); Hammersmith (Circle/Hammersmith & City)

Construction
- Opened: 1895; 131 years ago
- Rebuilt: 1979
- Architect: Frank Matcham (original)

Website
- lyric.co.uk

The Lyric Theatre, also known as the Lyric Hammersmith, is a nonprofit theatre on Lyric Square, off King Street, Hammersmith, London.

== Background ==
The Lyric Theatre was originally a music hall established in 1888 on Bradmore Grove, Hammersmith. It was rebuilt and enlarged on the same site twice, firstly in 1890 and then in 1895 by the English theatrical architect Frank Matcham, due to its success as a music venue. The 1895 reopening, as The New Lyric Opera House, was accompanied by an opening address by the famous actress Lillie Langtry.

In 1966 the theatre was due to be closed and demolished. However, a successful campaign to save it led to the auditorium being dismantled and reinstalled piece by piece within a modern shell on its current site on King Street, a short distance from the former Bradmore Grove location. The relocated theatre opened in 1979.

It has two main performance areas: the Main House, a 565-seat 19th-century auditorium maintaining the original design which hosts its main productions; and the 120-seat Studio, which houses smaller productions by up-and-coming companies. The Lyric also presents frequent Lyric Children and Lyric Music performances as well as Sunday Night Comedy.

A major redevelopment project at the Lyric, with new facilities for young people and the local community was completed in 2015. Designed by Rick Mather Architects, it was nominated in the 'community benefit' and 'tourism and leisure' categories at the RICS Awards 2016, London.

In 2011, the Lyric won the Olivier Award for Outstanding Achievement in an Affiliate Theatre for Sean Holmes' production of Sarah Kane's Blasted.

Its artistic director is Rachel O'Riordan, who succeeded Sean Holmes in February 2019. Its executive director is Amy Belson.

== Five strands ==
The Lyric's programme is divided into five strands:

- Main House
- Studio
- Music & Comedy
- Lyric Children
- Lyric Young Company

== Production history ==
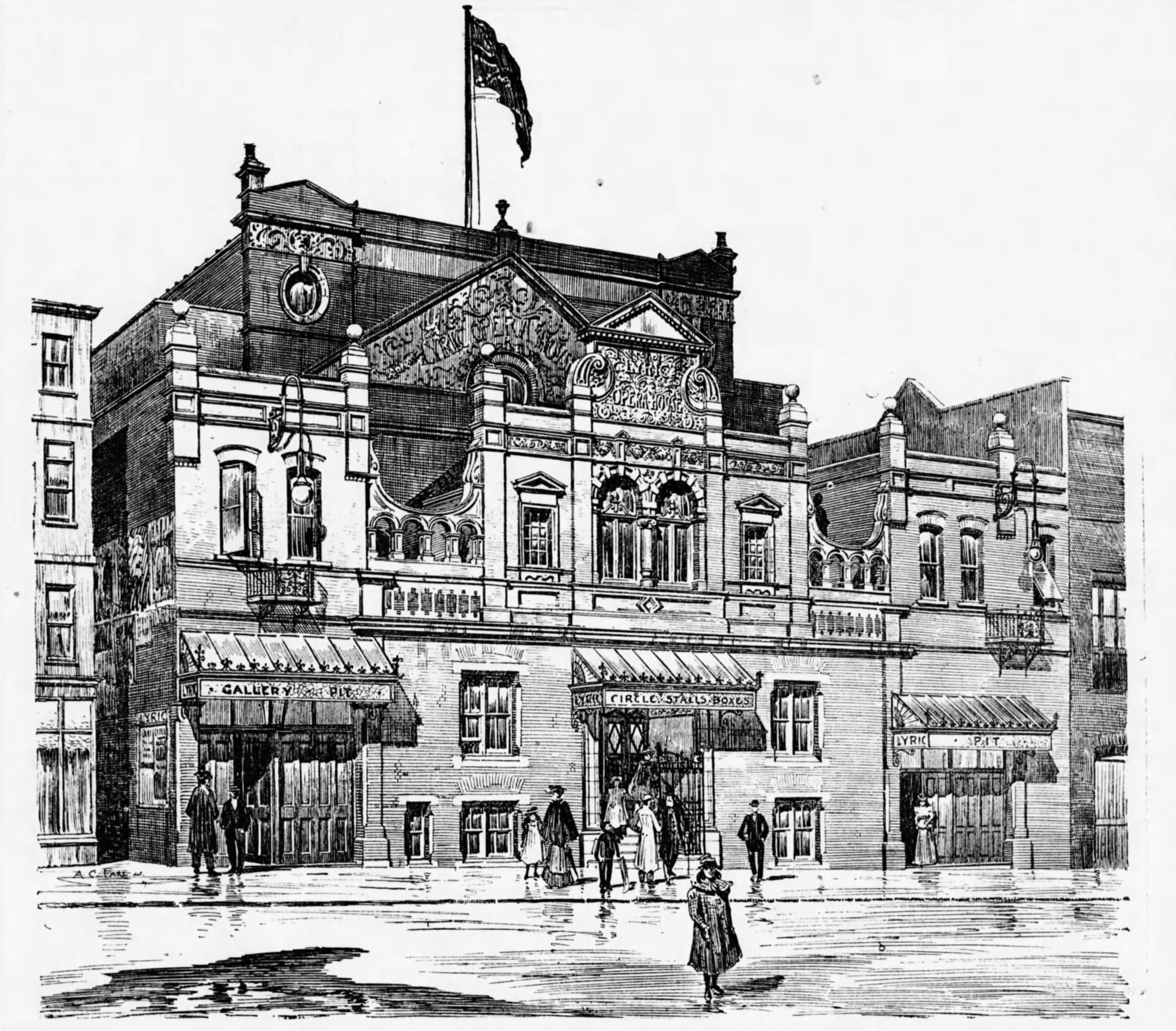
The 1895 exterior of the theatre, designed by Frank Matcham

(Source: the Lyric official website)

- A Doll's House 2019
- Noises Off 2019
- Ghost Stories 2019
- City of Glass, 2017
- The Seagull, 2017
- Herons, by Simon Stephens, 2016
- Cinderella, 2015
- Tipping The Velvet, 2015
- Bugsy Malone, 2015
- Secret Theatre, 2015
- Secret Theatre, 2014
- Secret Theatre, 2013
- Steptoe and Son produced by Kneehigh Theatre, 2013
- Metamorphosis by Franz Kafka, adapted by Gísli Örn Garðarsson and David Farr, 2013
- Alice by Heart by Steven Sater and Duncan Sheik, 2012
- Father Christmas by Raymond Briggs, adapted by Pins and Needles Productions, 2012
- Cinderella by Joel Horwood and Morgan Lloyd Malcolm, 2012
- Desire Under the Elms by Eugene O'Neill, 2012
- Morning by Simon Stephens, 2012
- Three Kingdoms by Simon Stephens, 2012
- A Midsummer Night's Dream by William Shakespeare, 2012
- Lovesong by Abi Morgan, 2012
- Aladdin by Joel Horwood, Morgan Lloyd Malcolm and Steve Marmion, 2011
- Saved by Edward Bond, 2011
- The Wild Bride created by Kneehigh Theatre, 2011
- Mogadishu by Vivienne Franzmann, 2011
- Roald Dahl's Twisted Tales, 2011
- Dick Whittington and his Cat, by Joel Horwood, Morgan Lloyd Malcolm and Steve Marmion, 2010
- Blasted by Sarah Kane, 2010
- The Big Fella (21 September – 16 October 2010)
- Punk Rock by Simon Stephens, 2010
- Lifegame (7 – 17 July 2010)
- Tightrope (17 – 19 June 2010)
- A Thousand Stars Explode in the Sky (7 May – 5 June 2010)
- Spymonkey's Moby Dick (20 April – 1 May 2010)
- Ghost Stories (24 February – 3 April 2010)
- Three Sisters (6 January – 20 February 2010)
- Jack and the Beanstalk (21 November 2009 – 9 January 2010
- Comedians (7 October – 14 November 2009)
- Punk Rock 2009 (3–26 September 2009)
- Spyski/The Importance of Being Ernest (3 October – 1 November 2008)
- Christmas For the Under 7s (29 November 2007 – 5 January 2008)
- Beauty and the Beast (6 – 24 November 2007)
- Casanova (16 October – 3 November 2007)
- Water (25 September – 13 October 2007)
- Rough Crossings (5 – 22 September 2007)
- The Bacchae (2 – 4 August 2007)
- Accidental Heroes (21 June – 22 July 2007)
- Angels in America: Part 2 (20 June – 22 July 2007)
- Angels in America: Part 1 (7 – 9 June 2007)
- Elegy (26 April – 26 May 2007)
- Absolute Beginners (3 – 14 April 2007)
- St George and the Dragon (13 – 31 March 2007)
- Don't Look Now (9 February – 10 March 2007)
- Ramayana (17 January – 3 February 2007)
- Cymbeline (23 November 2006 – 13 January 2007)
- Watership Down (31 October – 18 November 2006)
- pool (29 September – 28 October 2006)
- Metamorphosis (16 May – 17 June 2006)
- Aurélia's Oratorio (12 – 29 April 2006)
- The Wolves in the Walls (24 February – 1 April 2006)
- The Odyssey (20 January – 18 February 2006)
- Nights at the Circus Christmas (2 December 2005 – 14 January 2006)
- The Magic Carpet (1 – 26 November 2005)
- Brontë (19 – 29 October 2005)
- Road to Nowhere (2 September – 15 October 2005)
- Julius Caesar (30 June – 23 July 2005)
- Some Girls Are Bigger Than Others (17 June 2005)
- Asterisk (10 – 13 June 2005)
- Stars Are Out Tonight (19 April – 7 May 2005)
- Hymns (30 March – 16 April 2005)
- Aurelia's Oratorio (5 – 26 March 2005)
- Rhinoceros (18 February – 26 March 2005)
- A Raisin in the Sun (27 January – 12 February 2005)
- Strictly Dandia Christmas for 7+s (26 November 2004 – 22 January 2005)
- The Firework-Maker's Daughter (2 – 20 November 2004)
- The Bacchae (30 September – 30 October 2004)
- Don Juan (14 – 25 September 2004)
- A Passage to India/National Youth Theatre Guest Season/The Master and Margarita (20 August – 11 September 2004)
- Here's A Funny Thing, 1980
- Aladdin by Sandy Wilson, 1979

== Artistic directors ==
Name	Period
...	...
Peter James	1981–1992
Neil Bartlett	1994–2004
David Farr	2005–2008
Sean Holmes	2009–2018
Rachel O'Riordan	2019–present
