= Phil Clark (director) =

Phil Clark (born Philip David Clark, Brecon in August 1953) is a theatre director and writer, specialising in work for young people.

== Biography ==
Clark trained at the Rose Bruford College and in 2007 received a Phd. in Creating and Developing a policy for young people and emerging artists in a regional theatre from the University of Glamorgan Starting as a founding member of Theatre Powys in 1972, he became the Artistic Director of Newcastle upon Tyne's Bruvvers Theatre Company from 1975 to 1982. In 1983, he joined the Tyne Wear Theatre Company as a director and established the UK's largest annual youth theatre festival. The position of Artistic Director of the Crucible Theatre in Education followed from 1985 to 1989. In January 1990 he became the Artistic Director of the Sherman Theatre in Cardiff, Wales, which was later renamed Sherman Cymru, a post he held until 2006. For the last four years he has been the judge of Pint Sized Plays, part of the Tenby Folk Festival, the winners of which are performed at the Theatr Gwaun, Fishguard.

He is a trustee of The Theatres Trust (the National Advisory Public Body for Theatres), appointed in 2008.

== Work ==
=== Production ===
Major productions include:

- 1990 The Snow Spider by Jenny Nimmo and adapted by Mike Kenny, starring Iwan Tudor, Jill Richards, Fraser Cains, Siriol Jenkins and Arbel Jones (Sherman Theatre and tour)
- 2005 Danny, the Champion of the World by Roald Dahl and adapted by David Wood (Taliesin Arts Centre, Swansea

=== Books ===
Books include Act One Wales, a collection of Welsh one act plays charting the rise of Welsh Drama since the 1950s, and Oscar Wilde: Three Plays for Children
