= Rachel O'Riordan =

Irish theatre director (born 1974)

- Born: 1974 (age 51–52); Cork, Ireland
- Education: Queen Mary, University of London; University of Ulster (2002)
- Occupation: Theatre director
- Title: Artistic director, Lyric Theatre
- Predecessor: Sean Holmes
- Spouse: Richard Dormer
- Parent(s): Robert Anthony Welch; Angela O'Riordan

Rachel O'Riordan (born 1974) is an Irish theatre director. She is the artistic director at the Lyric Hammersmith, London.

== Early life and education ==
Born in Cork, Ireland to poet and novelist Robert Anthony Welch and Angela O'Riordan Welch, O'Riordan first trained as a ballet dancer. This culminated in a scholarship to the White Lodge, Royal Ballet School and then Mariinsky Ballet (formerly Kirov). She studied English and Theatre studies at Queen Mary, University of London, before completing her PhD entitled Shakespeare's Physical Text: The Body's Imperative at the University of Ulster in 2002.

== Career ==
From to 2002 to 2011, O'Riordan co-founded and ran the Ransom theatre company in Belfast, Northern Ireland, where she directed the production Hurricane. The show was performed at the Edinburgh Festival Fringe and earned a season in London's West End and Off-Broadway in New York City. O'Riordan then completed a season with the Peter Hall Company, where she directed August Strindberg's Miss Julie, and an adaption of George Orwell's Animal Farm at the Theatre Royal in Bath, England.

O'Riordan's tenure as artistic director of Ransom saw her commission and direct the first play by David Ireland, Arguments for Terrorism, and new plays Early Bird by Leo Butler and Transparency by Suzie Miller, Protestants by Robert Welch, and, the Irish famine-based This Piece of Earth by Richard Dormer. During this time she also ran a three-year programme entitled Writers on the Edge to develop new writing for women in Northern Ireland.

O'Riordan was artistic director at the Perth Theatre between 2011 and 2014. Her first production was Shakespeare's Twelfth Night. "Unfaithful" by Owen McCafferty was produced by the Traverse Theatre for the Edinburgh Fringe Festival in 2014.

In October 2013, O'Riordan was announced as artistic director of the Sherman Theatre in Cardiff, and took up the post in February 2014. The most significant result of the time in Cardiff was the formation of the partnership with playwright Gary Owen. Iphigenia in Splott and Killology were both award-winners.

In January 2016, she was named amongst the 100 most influential people in theatre in the UK by The Stage.

In February 2019 O'Riordan joined the Lyric Hammersmith, London as artistic director, succeeding Sean Holmes. Her first production was a transposition by Tanika Gupta of A Doll's House to Victorian Kolkata.

Productions in the return of theatre after the pandemic in 2022 were Scandaltown and a revival of Iphigenia in Splott, again with Sophie Melville. It was the choice of critic Arifa Akbar in The Guardian for best production of the year.

=== Personal life ===
O'Riordan is married to actor Richard Dormer.

== Selected productions ==
Year	Title	Venue	Writer	Notes
2019	A Doll's House	Lyric Hammersmith Theatre	Tanika Gupta	The first production of Rachel O'Riordan's tenureship as Artistic Director of the Lyric Hammersmith Theatre.
2018	Foxfinder	Ambassadors, London	Dawn King	
2018	Bird	Katherine Chandler	Sherman Theatre and Manchester Royal Exchange	
2018	The Weir	Sherman Theatre		
2017	Arabian Nights	Sherman Theatre		
2017	The Cherry Orchard	Sherman Theatre	Anton Chekov, in a new version by Gary Owen	
2017	Unfaithful	Traverse Theatre	Owen McCafferty	Edinburgh Festival
2017	Killology	Sherman Theatre/Royal Court	Gary Owen	Olivier Award for Outstanding Achievement in Affiliate Theatre.
2015/2016	Iphigenia in Splott	Sherman Theatre	Gary Owen	'Best new play' at the Theatre Awards UK.
2013	The Seafarer	Perth Theatre, Lyric Belfast	Conor McPherson	Shortlisted at the annual Critics' Awards for Theatre in Scotland (CATS) for best ensemble, best production and best director. Won 'Best Ensemble' and 'Best Director'.
2013	Macbeth	Perth Theatre	William Shakespeare	
2013	Moonlight and Magnolias	Perth Theatre	Ron Hutchinson	
2012	Someone who'll watch over me	Perth Theatre	Frank McGuinness	
2012	Twelfth Night	Perth Theatre	William Shakespeare	
2011	Arguments for Terrorism	Oran Mor	David Ireland	
2011	Over the Bridge	Waterfront Belfast	Sam Thompson	
2011	The Absence of Women	Lyric Belfast/Tricycle Theatre	Owen McCafferty	
2008	Absolution	Assembly Rooms, Edinburgh Festival	Owen O'Neill	Won the Best Director award in the First Irish Theatre Festival Awards in New York.
2007	Much ado about nothing	Lyric, Belfast	William Shakespeare	
2006	Ms Julie	Theatre Royal, Bath		Co-direction with Sir Peter Hall
2006	Everything is Illuminated	Hampstead Theatre	Owen McCafferty	
2005	The Glass Menagerie	Lyric, Belfast	Tennessee Williams	
2005	Animal Farm	Theatre Royal, Bath	George Orwell	Adapted by Sir Peter Hall
2004	Hurricane	Soho Theatre/Broadway	Richard Dormer	
