= Sean Holmes (theatre director) =

British theatre director

Sean Holmes is a British theatre director and Associate Artistic Director of Shakespeare's Globe. He was previously Artistic Director of Lyric Hammersmith.

== Theatre directing ==
Holmes has worked with the Royal Shakespeare Company, directing Julius Caesar, Measure for Measure, Richard III, The Roman Actor, A New Way to Please You and the Filter theatre company co-production of Twelfth Night.

He has directed plays at the Donmar Warehouse, the Old Vic, the Royal Court and other London theatres, including The Entertainer, The English Game, The Man Who Had All the Luck, The Price, Look Back in Anger, Moonlight and Magnolias and Pornography.

He was an associate director of the Oxford Stage Company (now Headlong theatre company) from 2001 to 2006.

He directed the new stage adaptation of Treasure Island, starring Keith Allen, which opened at the West End's Theatre Royal Haymarket in November 2008. He directed a revival of Joe Orton's Loot, starring Matt Di Angelo, at the Tricycle Theatre from December 2008.

In October 2008, it was announced that Holmes would take over from David Farr as artistic director of the Lyric Hammersmith in spring 2009. At the time of his appointment, the chairman of the theatre's board, Sandy Orr, said: "Everyone knows that Sean is one of today's outstanding theatre directors."

In 2011, the Lyric Hammersmith won the Olivier Award for Outstanding Achievement in an Affiliate Theatre for Holmes' production of Sarah Kane's Blasted. In autumn 2011, he directed the first London production in 27 years of Edward Bond's Saved at the Lyric Hammersmith.

In September 2018, it was announced that he would be succeeded as artistic director of the Lyric Hammersmith in February 2019 by Rachel O'Riordan. After leaving the Lyric Hammersmith Holmes became Associate Artistic Director of Shakespeare's Globe.

In 2026 he portrayed Charles Rotton the director of a production of King Lear at The Globe in the Japanese Netflix comedy drama series Did Someone Happen to Mention Me?
