= Sakkara (novel) =

2006 novel by Michael Carroll

- First edition (publ. HarperCollins)
- Author: Michael Carroll
- Language: English
- Genre: Science fiction
- Publisher: HarperCollins
- Publication date: 2006
- ISBN: 9780007210930
- OCLC: 70401278

Sakkara is a superhero novel by Michael Carroll, the second of the original New Heroes trilogy. The Gathering is the book's title in the US, where the series is known as Quantum Prophecy.

== Plot summary ==
Sakkara is a superpowers research facility in the heart of the United States. The adolescent superhumans of The Quantum Prophecy return; this time their covers are blown and they are forced to flee to the US in order to protect themselves from attack and publicity. The facility that they hide in is thought to be secret, until its name is known around the world following a terrorist attack in which the supervillain-turned-assassin leaves the word "Sakkara" spraypainted on the wall of an airport after killing dozens of people. Someone among the "New Heroes" or "old heroes" has broken protocol, but everyone is a suspect. As more and more attacks begin to occur, the pattern emerges that they are going after Trutopians. Trutopians are an international organisation designed to give each of its members security and equality, but with reduced comfort and freedoms. It is revealed that they are run by the antagonist of the last novel, Victor Cross, who is really just trying to "take over the world". The "New Heroes" learn more about their power and discover other heroes too. Colin learns that he actually inherited his powers from his mom, Energy, instead of his father, Titan. The heroes then learn that Yvonne was the one leaking information and in the end Solomon Cord, or Paragon, dies from a decision made by Colin.

== Publishing history ==
Sakkara was published in the UK by HarperCollins in October 2006 (ISBN 978-0007210930) as the second of the New Heroes series. Under the title Quantum Prophecy 2: The Gathering it was published in the US by Philomel Books in July 2008 (ISBN 978-0399247262).

== Reception ==
Nominated for Best Novel in the British Science Fiction Association Awards in 2006.
