= The Owl Tree =

1997 children's novella by Jenny Nimmo

- First edition (publ. Walker Books)
- Author: Jenny Nimmo
- Illustrator: Anthony Lewis
- Publisher: Walker Books
- Publication date: March 3, 1997
- ISBN: 9780744541427 Harcover

The Owl Tree is a 1997 children's novella by Jenny Nimmo. The story is about a boy, Joe, who tries to save an owl tree which his grandmother Granny Diamond is fond of and her neighbor, Mr Rock, who intends to cut down as it is too tall and blocking out the sunlight beneath it. It received the 1997 Smarties Book Prize Gold Award.

== Plot ==
While their Mum is in the hospital, Joe and his sister Minna are taken to their grandmother, Granny Diamond's house to be taken care of until their parents return.

After showing Joe his room, Granny Diamond tells him about an owl tree outside the house which grows in her neighbor Mr Rock's lawn. She tells him how one night she had once seen an owl perched on one of the branches of the tree and it had cheered her up that day because she had been sad about something. Thus to her it is the owl tree. She says half of the tree belongs to her because some branches of that tree fall in her garden.

One day, Granny Diamond informs Joe that Mr Rock is planning to cut down the tree. Joe begins trying to find a way to save the tree with the help of Minna and the Ludd twins and thinks that it is time for him to meet the owl in the owl tree because he is worried about how Granny Diamond will be affected if it is cut down. One day, Joe realises the tree is trying to tell him something so he goes to Mr Rock's house but becomes frightened and returns. Getting curious one night, he climbs the tree by one of its branches which is close to his bedroom window but then slips and falls into Mr Rock's garden. Mr Rock takes Joe back, causing a long argument between him, Joe and Granny over the tree but Mr Rock cannot be persuaded to keep it.

Later, Joe goes by himself to Mr Rock's house and talks to him personally. While talking, Mr Rock notices that Joe resembles his grandson, Tom. Suddenly, it occurs to Mr Rock that Tom also used to talk about some owl in the tree. Mr Rock gets emotional but still doesn't change his mind about the tree. Joe, knowing his stubbornness, goes back home. On the bonfire night, Joe sees Granny and Mr Rock standing near the hedge talking. Granny happily comes and informs Joe that the tree will not be cut. The story ends with fireworks.

== Reception ==
The Book Trust describes The Owl Tree as 'An uplifting, award-winning story which reminds us not to judge people on first impressions.' School zone finds it 'an extremely well written story which is an excellent read aloud.' Trinity College London calls it 'An atmospheric, descriptive piece about discovering the secrets that might be held in the branches of a tree.'

It was amongst the titles used in the 2011 Reading Crusade at Christchurch, amongst books recommended for lower primary children by Paul Jennings. and has appeared on numerous school reading lists.
