= The Magician Trilogy =

Children's books series by Jenny Nimmo

The Magician Trilogy (or, The Snow Spider Trilogy)
- The Snow Spider; Emlyn's Moon; The Chestnut Soldier
- Author: Jenny Nimmo
- Country: United Kingdom
- Language: English
- Genre: Children's fantasy, supernatural fiction, thriller
- Publisher: Methuen Children's Books
- Published: 1986–1989
- Media type: Print (hardcover)

The Magician Trilogy is a series of three children's fantasy novels by the British author Jenny Nimmo, first published by Methuen 1986 to 1989. It is sometimes called the Snow Spider trilogy or series after the first book and The Snow Spider Trilogy is the title of its omnibus editions (1991 and later). The stories are inspired by Welsh mythology, with elements borrowed from Mabinogion. Set in contemporary Wales, they feature Gwyn Griffiths, a boy descended from Gwydion who discovers and develops some of the magical power in his lineage.

The Snow Spider won the Tir na n-Og Award from the Welsh Books Council, recognising the year's best English-language children's book with an authentic Welsh background, and won the second annual Smarties Prize as the year's best children's book written by a United Kingdom citizen or resident. (Note: For two years there was a single Nestlé Prize for children's books. Three age categories were introduced for 1987 publications and retained as long as the prize continued.)

== Series ==
ISFDB catalogues the series as The Magician Trilogy. The novels were first published in hardcover editions by Methuen, the first two with illustrations by Joanna Carey, which were retained at least in early British paperbacks.

- The Snow Spider (1986)
- Emlyn's Moon (1987)
- The Chestnut Soldier (1989)

In the US, Emlyn's Moon was originally titled Orchard of the Crescent Moon (1989, 1990). There the novels were published a year or two after their first editions by Dutton Children's Books (an imprint recently acquired by Penguin). ISFDB does not report any interior artwork.

Omnibus editions entitled The Snow Spider Trilogy have been published in Britain. Mammoth paginated 468- and 435-page editions consecutively in 1991 and retained the Carey illustrations. Egmont UK's 2003 edition (ISBN 1-4052-1051-6) is paginated separately with counts that match Methuen's first editions and also some reissues in separate volumes (144, 158, and 168 pages).

== Plot ==
The stories are set in twentieth-century Wales and revolve around a boy named Gwyn Griffiths, who is descended from magicians, although neither parent believes that family lore. On his ninth birthday grandmother Nain Griffiths gives him five odd gifts that take him on a quest to discover whether he is a magician like his Celtic ancestors. They help him to unravel the mystery of his sister Bethan, who disappeared on his birthday four years ago.

In the sequel Gwyn again uses magical power to handle an outside threat to his family, and to resolve conflict within it. In the conclusion he strives to heal a soldier veteran of the Belfast Troubles, rather than anyone in his family.

== Reception ==
Kirkus Reviews covered all three books when their first US editions were published in 1987, 1989, and 1991 by Dutton Books (an imprint of Viking Penguin from 1986). The reviewers judged the realistic aspects more successful than the magical. In The Snow Spider, that is, the "fabled landscape and weather" of Wales and the stresses in Gwyn's family, in contrast to "the integration of magical powers into the life of an otherwise ordinary boy".

The second reviewer called Emlyn's Moon "another fine fantasy" based on Welsh lore. Although the realism is better than the magic (again), "Nimmo gives the fantasy an entrancing aura that enriches her subtle exploration of such themes as the sources and stresses of creation—of offspring or of art."

In the concluding Chestnut Soldier, Nimmo's undertook to recast the mythical story of Efnisien. "The legend is complex; drawing on her now-extensive cast for her modern counterpart, Nimmo attempts, with mixed success, to parallel every detail. ... the action—rather than being a contemporary drama illuminated by its heroic prototype—seems forced into the legend's mold, while the promising idea of linking Efnisien with modern battle stress is overburdened with clever but less than fully digested detail."

St. James Guide to Fantasy Writers (Detroit: St. James Press, 1996) reportedly called the series "a stunning achievement. Nimmo explores Gwyn's dual existence as ancient magician and young boy through five years, by turns showing his enthusiasm and weariness for his role as his awareness grows, and also his final acceptance of what he is."

== Adaptations ==
The Snow Spider and its sequels were adapted for television by the television writer Julia Jones, as three miniseries under their original titles. The films were directed by Pennant Roberts and broadcast 1988 to 1991 by HTV: The Snow Spider in four episodes, 1988; Emlyn's Moon in five episodes, 1990; and The Chestnut Soldier in four episodes, 1991. The series introduced Osian Roberts as Gwyn Griffiths with Siân Phillips as grandmother Nain Griffiths, Robert Blythe and Sharon Morgan as his parents, and Gareth Thomas as Mr. Llewellyn.

A stage production of The Snow Spider, adapted by Mike Kenny and directed by Phil Clark ran 1990/1991 at the Sherman Theatre, Cardiff and then toured to Theatr Clwyd, Mold and Theatr Gwynedd, Bangor.

The Snow Spider was adapted by Delyth Jones and James Lark for a stage production with a cast of seven actor-musicians, singing, dancing and playing their own instruments as well as taking on multiple roles. The substantial score was written by James Lark using harp, violins and percussion and incorporating folksong to give an authentic Welsh flavour to the sound world. The adaptation was first performed at Ovalhouse and described by Jenny Nimmo as a 'brilliant production'. The adaptation was revived for a Christmas tour in 2013, including three weeks at The Playhouse.

In 2020, the BBC adapted The Snow Spider into a 5-part serial on CBBC, directed by Jennifer Sheridan and partly written by original author Jenny Nimmo.
