= The Oxford Companion to Irish Literature =

- Cover of the first edition
- Editor: Robert Welch
- Language: English
- Subject: Irish literature
- Publisher: Oxford University Press
- Publication date: 1996
- Media type: Print (hardcover)
- Pages: 648
- ISBN: 978-0198661580

The Oxford Companion to Irish Literature is a book edited by Robert Welch and first published in 1996. Later abridged editions were published as The Concise Companion to Irish Literature.

The Oxford Companion to Irish Literature surveys the Irish literary landscape across sixteen centuries with over 2,000 entries. Entries range from ogham writing to 1990s fiction, poetry, and drama. There are accounts of authors such as Adomnán, 7th-century Abbot of Iona, Roddy Doyle, Brian Friel, Seamus Heaney, and Edna O'Brien. Individual entries are provided for all major works, like Táin Bó Cúailnge - the Ulster saga reflecting the Celtic Iron Age - to Swift's Gulliver's Travels, Edgeworth's Castle Rackrent, Ó Cadhain's Cré na Cille, and Banville's The Book of Evidence.

The book also presents some writers' historical contexts:

- The Irish Famine of 1845-8, which provided a theme for novelists, poets, and memoirists from William Carleton to Patrick Kavanagh and Peadar Ó Laoghaire.
- The founding of the Abbey Theatre and its impact on playwrights such as J. M. Synge and Padraic Colum; the Easter Rising which inspired Yeats to write 'Easter 1916'.

The Oxford Companion to Irish Literature has information on general topics, ranging from the stage Irishman to Catholicism, Protestantism, the Irish language, and university education in Ireland; and on genres such as annals, bardic poetry, and folksong.

== Sources ==
- Welch, Robert (2000). The Concise Oxford Companion to Irish Literature. doi:10.1093/acref/9780192800800.001.0001. ISBN 978-0-19-280080-0.
