= Robert Anthony Welch =

Irish author, screenwriter and scholar (1947–2013)

- Born: 25 November 1947; Cork, Ireland
- Died: 3 February 2013 (aged 65)
- Occupations: Playwright, poet, author, academic
- Spouse: Angela O'Riordan
- Children: 4, including Rachel O'Riordan
- Writing career
- Genres: Drama, fictional prose, reference

Robert Anthony Welch (25 November 1947 – 3 February 2013) was an Irish author and scholar.

== Biography ==
Robert Anthony Welch was an emeritus professor of English and former dean of the faculty at the University of Ulster. He joined the university in 1984 as professor of English and head of the School of English, Media, and Theatre Studies, having previously taught at the School of English, University of Leeds, and the University of Ife in Nigeria.

He was born in Cork, Ireland and was educated at University College Cork and later the University of Leeds. He earned his master's degree at Cork University under Sean Lucy and then went to study for his PhD under Yeats scholar Norman Jeffares at Leeds University, where he also held a lectureship in English. His research focused on the interaction between Gaelic tradition and Irish poetry in English, a field in which he achieved wide recognition and which was given special mention in the citation that led to his election to membership of the Royal Irish Academy in 2008.

Welch was married to Angela O'Riordan, with whom he had four children, including theatre director Rachel O'Riordan. A novelist and poet as well as a critic and editor, Welch published The Oxford Companion to Irish Literature in 1996, a book that appeared on the bestsellers list.

== Poetry ==
Welch's first published volume of poetry was Muskerry (1991, Dedalus Press), followed by Secret Societies (1997, Dedalus Press) and The Blue Formica Table (1999, Dedalus Press), and The Evergreen Road (2004, Lagan Press). A new collection titled Constanza was published in July 2010. In 2009, Welch received the O'Connor Literary Award in Monasterevin, County Kildare at the Gerard Manley Hopkins summer school.

== Fiction ==
Welch's fiction includes The Kilcolman Notebook (1994, Brandon Press), followed by Tearmann (in Irish, Coisceim, 1997) and Groundwork (1997, Blackstaff Press) which was named in The New York Times Book Review as one of the notable books of 1998 and was translated and serialised for Slovak national radio. Japhy Ryder: Ar Shleasaibh na Mangartan, a book of biographical and critical studies, won the prize at Oireachteas, Ireland's premier Irish language cultural festival, in 2011.

Two stories from a collection titled The Trap of their Hexes appeared in The Dublin Review, and another story from the collection appeared in the Irish Pages. Kicking the Black Mamba: Life, Death, Alcohol and Death, a memoir of his son Egan who drowned in 2007, was published in September 2012 by Darton, Longman and Todd. The book prompted significant attention from paper, internet, radio and television media on its release and posthumously achieved the number -one position among RTÉ best sellers. It was called a "masterpiece of memoir-writing" by reviewer Paddy Kenoe.

== Criticism ==
Welch's critical work began in 1980 with Irish Poetry from Moore to Yeats (Colin Smythe), which charted for the first time the achievements of the major 19th-century Irish poets leading to the work of William Butler Yeats. This was followed by other work, including A History of Verse Translation from the Irish: 1789–1897 (1988, Colin Smythe Ltd), Changing States: Transformations in Modern Irish Writing (1993, Routledge). Welch's history of the Abbey Theatre, Dublin was published in 1999 to mark the centenary of the first productions of what became the Irish National Theatre. This was titled A History of the Abbey Theatre 1899–1999: Form and Pressure (1999, Oxford University Press). He edited for Penguin Books W B Yeats: Writings on Irish Folklore, Legend, and Myth (1993). The Oxford Companion to Irish Literature appeared in 1996, followed by a concise version in 2000. Other editorial work included Patrick Galvin: New and Selected Poems (with Greg Delanty, 1996, Cork University Press). This volume includes notes and a jointly authored introduction. Welch wrote the introduction to Rogha Danta/Death in the Land of Youth: New and Selected Poems of Seán Ó Tuama (1997, Cork University Press). His first posthumous release, The Cold of Mayday Monday, was released in 2014 and is considered a "major achievement of scholarship and narrative."

== Editor ==
Welch was general editor of a series published by Colin Smythe entitled Ulster Editions and Monographs containing 16 volumes. With Professor Brian Walker of Queen's University Belfast, he was general editor of the five-volume series The Oxford History of the Irish Book from Oxford University Press. Volume 3, entitled The Irish Book in English 1550–1800, appeared in 2006, edited by Raymond Gillespie and Andrew Hadfield. Volume 5, entitled The Irish Book in English 1890–2000, appeared in 2010, edited by Clare Hutton and Patrick Walsh.

== Playwright ==
Welch's play Protestants was commissioned by his daughter Rachel O'Riordan's Ransom Productions in 2004 and premiered at The Old Museum Arts Centre in Belfast, followed by a tour of Northern Ireland, the West End (Soho Theatre) and Edinburgh (Traverse Theatre). In 2010, Welch was commissioned by Ransom Productions to write one part of a double bill entitled Both Sides along with David Ireland, which opened at the Lyric Theatre.

== Accolades ==
In 1992, Welch was awarded the Oireachtas Prize for criticism, and in 2003 he was made Senior Distinguished Research Fellow of the University of Ulster. In 2008 he was awarded membership to the Royal Irish Academy. In 2009 he was awarded the O'Connor Award at the Gerard Manley Hopkins Literature Festival in Kildare, Ireland.

== Published works ==
- Irish Poetry from Moore to Yeats (Colin Smythe and Barnes & Noble, Gerrards Cross and New York, 1988),
- The Way Back: George Moore's The Untilled Field and The Lake (Wolfhound Press and Barnes & Noble, Dublin and New York, 1988)
- A History of Verse Translation from the Irish, 1789–1897 (Colin Smythe and Barnes & Noble, Gerrards Cross and New York, 1988)
- Literature and the Art of Creation: Essays in Honour of A.N. Jeffares (Colin Smythe and Barnes & Noble, Gerrards Cross and New York, 1988), ed., with Suheil Badi Bushrui, 350pp.
- General editor, Vols I–XVII, Ulster Editions and Monographs (Colin Smythe and Barnes & Noble, Gerrards Cross and New York, 1988).
- Muskerry (poems) (Dedalus Press, 1991), Dublin
- Editor and author of introduction, Irish Writers and Religion (Colin Smythe and Barnes & Noble, Gerrards Cross and New York, 1991)
- W.B. Yeats: Irish Folklore, Legend and Myth (Penguin, 1993), editor, author of introduction and notes
- Changing States: Transformations in Modern Irish Writing (Routledge, 1993)
- Kilcolman Notebook (novel), (Brandon Press, 1993)
- The Oxford Companion to Irish Literature (Clarendon Press, 1996)
- Irish Myths (Appletree Press, Belfast, 1996)
- Patrick Galvin: New and Selected Poems (Cork University Press, 1996), editor (with Greg Delanty), co-author of introduction and notes
- Secret Societies (poems) (Dedalus Press, Dublin and Dufour, New York, 1996)
- Tearmann (novel, in Irish) (Coiscéim, Dublin, 1997)
- Groundwork (novel), (Blackstaff Press, 1997)
- The Blue Formica Table (poems), (Dedalus Press, Dublin and Dufour, New York, 1999)
- The Abbey Theatre 1899–1999: Form and Pressure (Oxford University Press, 1998)
- The Oxford Companion to Irish Literature (Concise) (ed.), Oxford University Press
- The Evergreen Road (poems), (Lagan Press, 2006)
- Protestants (drama), (Lagan Press, 2006)
- The Oxford History of the Irish Book, Vol III (of 5 volumes), (General Editor with Brian Walker, 2006)
- Constanza, (Lagan Press, 2010)
- Japhy Ryder: Ar Shleasaibh na Mangartan, (Coiscéim Press, 2012)
- Kicking the Black Mamba, (Darton, Longman and Todd, 2012)
- The Cold of Mayday Monday, (Oxford University Press, 2014)
