= The New Heroes =

Novel series by Michael Carroll

The New Heroes (US series title: Quantum Prophecy) is a series of novels and short stories by Michael Carroll, first published in January 2006 by HarperCollins in the UK. The stories center on realistic depictions of superhuman abilities manifesting in the world and the subsequent appearance of superheroes and villains. The first trilogy follows young adolescents as they become aware of their abilities and the danger those powers may put them in. In December 2007, the author published a collection of short stories entitled Superhuman, which expanded upon the mythology. Carroll's exploration of realistic superhuman abilities has garnered attention for its unique approach to the genre. A review in the San Francisco Chronicle praised Carroll's ability to craft believable characters within extraordinary circumstances."Superpowers Meet Real Life". San Francisco Chronicle. 27 May 2007.

The first in the original HarperCollins trilogy is titled The Quantum Prophecy (ISBN 978-0007210923, January 2006), the second is Sakkara (ISBN 978-0007210930, October 2006), and the third Absolute Power (ISBN 978-0007210947, July 2007). A prequel series, including four novels, beginning with Super Human, has been completed. The other three novels in the prequel series are The Ascension, Stronger, and Hunter. Crossfire, released in October 2015, and The Chasm, released in June 2017, make up the final two books in the series, both taking place after the original trilogy.

== The Quantum Prophecy ==
The first of the original trilogy.

=== Plot summary ===
The story opens with a seemingly random battle among the many superhumans that inhabited the Western world ten years previously at the foot of a gigantic tank on its way to New York City. The superheroes and supervillains all seem to lose their abilities during this slugfest.

Ten years later, Colin Wagner and Danny Cooper, the children of these superhumans, are discovering their abilities, and they soon learn that they have also inherited abilities from their parents' enemies. The teenagers are kidnapped to calibrate a machine that may possibly take away their powers and stop a war that Danny's father, the man once known as Quantum, prophesied. Danny was believed to be the cause of this war, so he allowed the supervillain Façade to take his place in order for Maxwell Dalton to record his visions of the future as he broke down. They had hoped to avert it by stripping the world of superpowers ten years before, but the machine was destroyed, and Danny's powers continued to manifest. The new machine would be unstable and potentially kill hundreds of thousands of people, but it was a risk they were willing to take. With the help of old heroes, including the frozen-in-time Renata Soliz (Diamond), they stop this from happening and have the people behind the plot taken away. By the end of the book, they realize how much risk is involved in becoming superhuman, with Danny's arm now missing, his birth father dead, and many lives irrevocably changed.

=== US title and publishers ===
In the United States, the series was originally published by Philomel Books as Quantum Prophecy, so the books' titles were changed. In 2008, the series was slated to be republished by Puffin Books. The first is The Awakening (ISBN 0399247254, April 2007 and ISBN 978-0-14-241179-7, May 2008).

=== Reception ===
The Quantum Prophecy was nominated for the Ottakar's 2006 Children's Book Prize. The book received positive reviews from nearly all critics, but some criticised the kitsch marketing of the series. The San Francisco Chronicle described the book as a fast-paced adventure that captures the anxieties of adolescence."Superpowers Meet Real Life". San Francisco Chronicle. 27 May 2007.

== Sakkara ==
The second of the New Heroes trilogy.

=== Plot summary ===
Sakkara revolves around the titular superpower research facility in the heart of the United States. The adolescent superhumans of The Quantum Prophecy return. Their covers are blown, and they are forced to flee to the US to protect themselves from attack and publicity. The facility that they hide in is thought to be secret until its name is known around the world following a terrorist attack in which the supervillain-turned-assassin leaves the word Sakkara spray-painted on the wall of an airport after killing dozens of people. Someone among the "New Heroes" or "old heroes" has broken protocol, but everyone is a suspect. As more and more attacks begin to occur, the pattern emerges that they are going after Trutopians. Trutopians are an international organisation designed to give each member security and equality but with reduced freedoms. It is revealed that they are run by the antagonist of the last novel, Victor Cross, who has his ideas of international peace and wishes to impose them on the world.

=== US title ===
The Gathering (ISBN 978-0399247262, July 2008)

=== Reception ===
Nominated for Best Novel in the British Science Fiction Association Awards in 2006.

== Absolute Power ==
A direct continuation of the previous book.

=== Synopsis ===
Not so long ago, the world believed superhumans died after a great battle wiped out heroes and villains. Ten years later, "The New Heroes," a group of second-generation youngsters possessing superhuman powers, have emerged and are now faced with difficult decisions when their leader, Colin Wagner, runs away amid a political attack from the globe-spanning Trutopian organization led unknown to them, by their enemy Victor Cross and his accomplice Yvonne. The pair have begun to plant the seeds of a dark shadow game that will manipulate the heroes into a series of actions threatening to throw the world into war. If the planet is to survive, the new heroes will have to fight harder than that.

=== Plot summary ===
The lives of teenagers have been changed forever, and they have decided to proactively use the powers of their own free will to better the world. Collin does not know that Victor Cross leads the Trutopians but soon finds himself under Yvonne's mind-control. Unable to resist Yvonne's orders, Collin soon turns against his fellow heroes, fighting on the side of the people he had vowed to bring to justice.

=== US Title ===
In the United States, Absolute Power, the third book in the series, is published under the title The Reckoning. (ISBN 978-0142415702, June 2010)

== Superhuman ==
Superhuman is a collection of short stories set in the New Heroes universe. One story is long enough to be considered a novella, however. The author released the book exclusively through the New Heroes website in December 2007; each is signed and numbered. It is limited to 1,000 copies.

=== Stories ===
Below is a list of the individual stories in the book. It also contains a number of articles and has a foreword by Michael Scott.

- "A Decade Without Heroes"
- "What I Did on My Holidays"
- "The Offer"
- "Pressure"
- "The Footsoldiers"
- "Out of Sight"
- "Flesh and Blood"
- "Scholarship Boy"
- "A Million"

== Super Human ==
On May 13, 2010, the official New Heroes website released a prequel to the events of the New Heroes trilogy, Super Human.

=== Plot summary ===
A mysterious group is trying to bring Krodin, a four-thousand-year-old superhuman, forward in time to control the modern world. The story begins with Abby, a seemingly average girl with the power of superhuman strength, but only with metal. She is in the middle of working at a dinner when a television report comes on about a siege at a nearby warehouse that a terrorist group is using to hold hostages. Abby rushes to the scene, along with a mysterious and quiet boy who would come to the dinner daily. Abby and the boy (who is revealed to be Thunder and has the power of sound wave manipulation) try to infiltrate the warehouse with the help of Paragon and the US Military.

== The Ascension ==
Another prequel to the events of the New Heroes trilogy and a sequel to Super Human, The Ascension, was released in summer 2011. The plot involves Krodin, who mysteriously survived death by being sent back six years after his battle with Abby, Thunder, Roz, and Brawn. In the present, the kids begin to notice changes in their America. It was released on June 30, 2011, and is the fifth book in the New Heroes series.

== Stronger ==
The sixth book in the New Heroes series was released on June 14, 2012. It is the backstory of Brawn, a rather minor villain up until this point.

All Gethin Rao wants is to be like every other boy his age. But normal twelve-year-olds are not blue. And they certainly are not thirteen feet tall. That is what happens when his superpowers kick in. From that moment on, his life has never been the same. Nicknamed Brawn and treated as a villain – a monster – Gethin spends years on the run or as a prisoner in a secret military facility. When Gethin finally falls in with a group of superpowered teens, he becomes the one thing he never thought he would be: a hero. But as the years pass, Gethin learns that being a good guy is much more complicated than he once thought.

== Hunter ==
The defeat of the near-invincible villain Krodin has left a void in the superhuman hierarchy that two opposing factions are trying to fill. The powerful telepath Max Dalton believes that the human race must be controlled and shepherded to a safe future, while his rival, Casey Duval, believes that strength can only be achieved through conflict.

Caught in the middle is Lance McKendrick, a teenager with no special powers, only his wits and the tricks of a con artist. But Lance has a mission of his own. Krodin's ally, the violent and unpredictable supervillain, Slaughter, murdered Lance's family and he intends to make her pay.

Hunter was published in the US on May 1, 2014.

== Crossfire ==
The world is slowly recovering from the chaos of the Trutopian War, but that was only the beginning. A dangerous enemy has emerged, and the New Heroes quickly find themselves outmatched and outnumbered. When their enemy starts to pick off their colleagues one by one, they realize that in order to win, they must fight the battle on the enemy's terms. But how far are they willing to go to save the human race?

Crossfire is the eighth book in the series and the first book of a final series following the original trilogy. It was published worldwide in October 2015.

== The Chasm ==
The Chasm is the ninth and final book in the Quantum Prophecy series. It takes place after Crossfire and sees Krodin return. It was published worldwide in June 2017.

== New Heroes ==
- Colin Wagner (aka Kid Titan, Titan, and Power):
  - Is a major protagonist in the series with incredible superhuman strength and hearing. His best friend is Danny Cooper. He is the son of Titan and Energy (former superheroes who lost their powers in the fight on Mystery Day ten years prior), inheriting their strength and powers. The second book reveals that Colin can absorb and manipulate energy, usually in the form of heat/fire and electricity. In the final book, he gains the ability to fly.
- Danny Cooper:
  - Is another hero in the series, is Quantum's son, inheriting his precognition, intangibility, and superhuman speed. It is later revealed that Danny can control time, speeding, slowing, stopping, or altering it. Quantum and Max Dalton believe him to be a key component in bringing about the apocalypse. At the end of the first book, he loses his right arm to stop the power-dampener, replaced with a cybernetic arm in book three. He and Renata are in love.
- Renata Soliz (aka Diamond):
  - A heroine who can turn herself into an indestructible crystalline form, was trapped in her statue state for ten years after the power dampener froze her. Biologically, she is fourteen, though chronologically, she is twenty-four. She was awakened by a flawed power-dampener and teamed up with Colin and Danny to stop the machine. She teamed up with Colin until the heroes' identities were revealed when they relocated to Sakkara. Her parents are revealed to a part of the organization the Trutopian. It is revealed in Absolute Power that she can control the part of her body to crystal and crystallize others. She used the last of her power to crystallize Earth to stop the Trutopian war and return it to its former state, as revealed by Mina. By the end of Absolute Power, she is believed to have lost her powers forever due to the strain of crystallizing the Earth. In Crossfire, a device successfully returns her powers.
- Butler Redmond:
  - A young man who can produce a telekinetic force field, is the least popular of the New Heroes due to his obnoxious behavior. However, Absolute Power proves him useful when the Truthopians attack Sakkara. He is killed in Crossfire.
- Mina:
  - A hero and biological sister of Yvonne. In Sakkara, she is considered quiet and shy, but she is later revealed to be controlled by Yvonne. In the final book of the Quantum Prophecy, it is revealed that Mina has incredible strength and short-range teleportation. She can also sense auras.
- Yvonne:
  - One of the main antagonists and biological sister to Mina, has enhanced strength, an enormous IQ, and the ability to control almost anyone's mind. In Sakkara, it is believed that, along with Mina, she had lived in the facility all her life. With the help of Victor Cross, she helped him nearly destroy the New Heroes and bring his organization, known as the Truthopians (an evil organization that recruits its members by spreading the word of peace and trust throughout its community), to fruition. In Absolute Power, she takes over the organization and causes a war between the Truthopians and the rest of the world, only to be stopped by the New Heroes.
- Stephanie Cord:
  - Is the daughter of the armored superhero Paragon. She is well-trained in martial arts and can pilot his jet pack. She is a member of the New Heroes and a leader in their armored division. She is in an on-and-off relationship with Colin.
- Garland Lighthouse (aka Razor):
  - Was a homeless street teen living in a shelter for runaways until Colin showed up, and they helped each other out. It is revealed that he is the son of Lance McKendrick.

== Heroes (prequel series) ==
- Lance McKendrick:
  - Is a proto-superhuman with some form of empathy. He is the father of Garland Lighthouse (aka Razor).
- Rosalyn Dalton:
  - Is telekinetic, with the power to move objects with her mind and create shields of telekinetic energy. She is also the sister of Josh and Max Dalton.
- Abigail de Luyando (aka Hesperus):
  - A girl with enhanced speed, resilience, flight, and massively increased strength, though only with metal objects. She is bulletproof, wields a metal sword, and wears a metal collapsible bow on her arm, with carbon steel arrows capable of "killing an elephant." She shows up at the end of Crossfire.
- Thunder (James Klaus):
  - A protagonist with a near-genius IQ and the ability to manipulate sound waves. He uses this ability to fly.

== Background heroes ==
- Titan:
  - A former hero who was superhumanly strong, fast, and able to fly, lost his powers ten years before the beginning of the main story; he was revealed to be Warren Wagner, the father of Colin Wagner.
- Energy:
  - A former heroine who could absorb energy and manipulate it and who could fly, she lost her powers ten years before the beginning of the main story, revealed to be the mother of Colin Wagner.
- Paragon:
  - A former hero who did not have superhuman powers, utilizing a jet-pack and protective armor. Dioxin killed him in Sakkara to spare Renata's family.
- Apex:
  - The first confirmed sighting of Apex took place about six years before the superhumans disappeared, though several earlier sightings are now believed to have been incorrectly attributed to Paragon. Though Apex spoke very little and almost always remained in the background, he quickly became a favorite with the public and – aside from Titan and Max Dalton – more has been written about Apex than any other superhero. He is also described as ruthless when dealing with all criminals, from common muggers to supervillains. He had superhuman strength and agility.
- Thalamus:
  - A proto-superhuman with greatly increased intelligence.
- Octavian:
  - Little is known about Octavian. He appears very infrequently and does not appear to have taken part in any major battles.
- Impervia:
  - Helps Colin and his superhuman counterparts in the second Quantum Prophecy. She had superhuman strength, durability, and flight, but lost her powers to the power dampener.
- Quantum:
  - Danny's father. He was driven insane by his precognition and as a result his civilian identity was replaced by reformed shapeshifting super villain Façade.
- Inferno
- Zephyr
- Maxwell Dalton:
  - Former superhero who had the power of mind control.
- Joshua Dalton:
  - Former superhero who had the power of Telekinesis.
- Daedalus:
  - The alternate reality version of Casey Duval. He had superhuman intelligence, strength, and durability, and also has a high tech avian-like battle suit.
- The Poder-Meninas
- Alia Cord:
  - One of Solomon Cord (Paragon)'s twin daughters, she believed that when Colin Wagner made the decision to save Renata's family and kill Solomon Cord, it was not his fault.
- The Rangers
- The White Wasp
- Grant Paramjeet:
  - A boy who wants Stephanie Cord to teach him how to be a superhero like her father, Paragon.
- Brawn:
  - Rather than a bad guy, he was just misunderstood. People assumed he was a villain or a monster, so he was viewed by many people as evil. He is the only one resistant to Max Dalton's mind control, as revealed in the sixth book.

== Villains ==
Villains throughout the novels:

- Victor Cross:
  - The main antagonist. He possesses the power of superhuman intelligence.
- Evan Laurie:
  - Cross's personal assistant.
- Yvonne:
  - A mind-controlling psychokinetic superhuman who is a superhuman clone. She was found in a glass jar at Ragnarok's secret base, which was an apartment block. Yvonne's mind control can be resisted if there is a filter on a phone or speaker that shorts out the controlling properties of her voice. Even though she tries to destroy America, the new heroes stop her and put her in prison. Shortly after this, someone gets close enough to her that they are able to put a bullet in her vocal cords. She survives, but will never speak again. She also has superhuman intelligence and strength.
- Ragnarok/Casey Duval:
  - A superhuman with superhuman intelligence, strength, durability, and the ability to see and know a superhuman's powers. Created the power-dampener, stripping all superhumans of their powers, including himself. He dies while battling Paragon.
- Dioxin:
  - Super-villain turned hired assassin following Mystery Day. He was able to produce venomous acid from his body. The loss of powers physically deformed him due to no longer being immune to his body's acids.
- Slaughter
  - One of the main protagonists in the book Super Human, she is a high-ranked officer in the organization called the Helotry, can fly, heal quickly, and is resistant to many things and is incredibly strong. She had a bad temper.
- Terrain:
  - Telekinetic whose powers can move large amounts of natural and environmental materials, like sand, dirt, and stone
- Krodin:
  - The main antagonist in Superhuman and Ascension who was a warlord during ancient times. He is worshiped by the Helotry and considered the first superhuman. He has superhuman strength, durability, regeneration, and telepathy. He is also experienced in hand-to-hand combatant and very cunning. He is very adaptable; certain attacks only work once on him.
- Facade:
  - Niall's father and Danny's half-father. He takes the place of Quantum's secret identity, PJ Cooper, to help watch over Danny and make sure that he does not develop his superhuman powers. He ends up helping the kids over time, and Danny starts to forgive him. Niall also might develop Facade's former shapeshifting powers since Facade is his father.
- Alexandria, also known as Krodin's wife (the old woman):
  - Part of the ancient resistance that resisted Krodin's rule in ancient times.
- The Scarlet Slayer:
  - A villain who was imprisoned with Brawn in Stronger, having superhuman strength, durability, and flight. Was not very bright.
- The Shark
- Gyrobot:
  - A villain mentioned in Stronger with superhuman intelligence. Could create weapons from simple devices.
- Schizophrenzy
- Waspider:
  - A superhuman who, as described by Brawn in Stronger, can move incredibly fast on all four legs, like a spider. Is called half wasp because his attacking tactic is similar to that of a wasp.
- Harmony Yuan
- Dr. Tremont
- Gladius
- Remington
- Termite
- Texanimal
- The Red Fury
- Brawn:
  - Four-meter high superhuman that possesses super human strength and durability, entirely blue with colorless eyes and no hair.
- Pyrokine:
  - A boy who is introduced and killed in the book Super Human after defeating the ancient King and superhuman Krodin. He does this by engulfing himself with energy and light so hot it kills himself and sends Krodin back in time. He was also Rosalyn Dalton's boyfriend a few months before Maxwell Dalton terminated their relationship and framed Pyrokine for a crime, which he was locked up for. He could turn matter into energy.

== Trivia ==
- Crossfire, The Chasm, and the short story collection Superhuman were all published under the company MaxEdDal Publications, the author's private publishing name for this series. It is named after the in-universe corporation MaxEdDal Pharmaceuticals, run by the character Maxwell Edwin Dalton.
