= Johnson Johnson =

Hero of a series of mystery novels by Dorothy Dunnett

Johnson Johnson is the hero of a series of mystery novels written by Dorothy Dunnett (originally published under her maiden name, Dorothy Halliday). Johnson Johnson is a widowed portrait painter who doubles as an agent for the British secret service. A constant theme in all the novels is his yacht, the Dolly.

Each book is told in the first person, from the viewpoint of the heroine, and opens with a comment on Johnson Johnson's bifocals.

== Bibliography ==
In this series, the date of publication is not the same as the book's order in the series.

1. Dolly & the Bird of Paradise (later retitled Tropical Issue) (1983)
  - The heroine of this book ("the Bird of Paradise") is Rita Geddes, a Glaswegian make-up artist. The story opens when she is engaged by a famous photographer to do the make-up for a photography session being held in Johnson Johnson's apartment. Johnson has putatively just been in a plane accident, although this was actually a murder attempt. Rita is dyslexic, a fact that is not disclosed until halfway through the book, and one that puts her life in peril.
2. Dolly & the Singing Bird (in America The Photogenic Soprano; later retitled Rum Affair) (1968)
  - The heroine of this book ("the Singing Bird") is Tina Rossi, an opera singer.
3. Dolly & the Cookie Bird (in America Murder in the Round; later retitled Ibiza Surprise) (1970)
  - The heroine of this book ("the Cookie Bird") is Sarah Cassells, a caterer.
4. Dolly & the Doctor Bird (in America Match for a Murderer; later retitled Operation Nassau) (1971)
  - The heroine of this book ("the Doctor Bird") is Dr. B. Douglas MacRannoch, a medical doctor. Beltanno (the reason she goes by her initials) has accompanied her father out to the Bahamas and taken a post at a hospital in Nassau. The story begins when Beltanno is flying back from New York; she saves the life of Sir Bart Edgecombe, a British agent, who has been poisoned with arsenic.
5. Dolly & the Starry Bird (in America Murder in Focus; later retitled Roman Nights) (1973)
  - Set in Italy, the heroine of this book ("the Starry Bird") is Ruth Russell, an astronomer. Ruth is living with Charles Digham, a fashion photographer and writer of obituary verses.
6. Dolly & the Nanny Bird (later retitled Split Code) (1976)
  - The heroine of this book ("the Nanny Bird") is Joanna Emerson, a nanny. The story opens in Winnipeg, Manitoba with Joanna being reluctantly hired as the nanny to the infant heir to a cosmetics fortune. Joanna, in addition to being a nanny, is an expert in codes, and both she and Johnson know that someone connected to the hiring is an agent for the opposite side. Like most of Dunnett's books, the story takes place in a variety of exotic locations, including New York and Yugoslavia.
7. Moroccan Traffic (in America Send a Fax to the Kasbah) (1991)
  - The heroine of this book is Wendy Helmann, a secretary. It also has the return of Rita Geddes (the Bird of Paradise.)
