= Children of the Red King =

Fantasy novel series by Jenny Nimmo

- Midnight for Charlie Bone; The Time Twister; The Blue Boa; The Castle of Mirrors; Charlie Bone and the Hidden King; Charlie Bone and the Wilderness Wolf; Charlie Bone and the Shadow of Badlock; Charlie Bone and the Red Knight; (first edition titles)
- Author: Jenny Nimmo
- Cover artist: David Wyatt (First); Scott Altmann (Second); Chris Sheban (US)
- Country: United Kingdom
- Language: English
- Genre: Children's fantasy novels, school stories
- Publisher: Egmont Books
- Published: 2002–current
- Media type: Print (trade paperback #1–2, hardcover #3–8; 3000 pp.)
- No. of books: 8
- Followed by: Chronicles of the Red King

Children of the Red King is a series of ten children's fantasy, school and adventure novels written by British author Jenny Nimmo, first published by Egmont 2002 to 2010. It is sometimes called "the Charlie Bone series" after its main character. A series of five books was announced in advance, completed in 2006, and sometimes the books were called the "Red King Quintet" until its continuation.

A prequel trilogy, Chronicles of the Red King, has been published, which tells the story of the Red King.

Two follow up books, Henry and the Guardians of the Lost and Gabriel and the Phantom Sleepers, were written a few years after the prequel trilogy.

== Contents ==
Children of the Red King comprises ten novels. All were first published by Egmont Books and the first 8 with cover art by David Wyatt. The first two were released in paperback editions, the following 6 were released in hardcover.

1. Midnight for Charlie Bone (January 2002)
2. The Time Twister (October 2003)
3. The Blue Boa (April 2004)
4. The Castle of Mirrors (June 2005)
5. Charlie Bone and the Hidden King (June 2006)
6. Charlie Bone and the Wilderness Wolf (June 2007)
7. Charlie Bone and the Shadow of Badlock (September 2008)
8. Charlie Bone and the Red Knight (October 2009)

In the United States, the books were released with the following titles (variants shown by bold type):

1. Midnight for Charlie Bone (March 2003)
2. Charlie Bone and the Time Twister (September 2003)
3. Charlie Bone and the Invisible Boy (July 2004)
4. Charlie Bone and the Castle of Mirrors (July 2005)
5. Charlie Bone and the Hidden King (May 2006)
6. Charlie Bone and the Beast (May 2007)
7. Charlie Bone and the Shadow (September 2008)
8. Charlie Bone and the Red Knight (May 2010)
9. Henry and the Guardians of the Lost (September 2016)
10. Gabriel and the Phantom Sleepers (October 2018)

== Plot summaries ==
=== Midnight for Charlie Bone ===
In the first novel, 10-year-old Charlie Bone discovers that he has a special power. After accidentally encountering a photograph of a missing baby, Charlie begins to hear the voices of people in photographs. He discovers that he is a descendant of the Red King, who was an ancient magician. Many of the Red King's descendants are endowed with magical powers. His cruel and uncaring Grandmother Bone and her three evil sisters send him to Bloor's Academy, where many endowed children study. With the help of a mysterious man named Mr. Onimous and his magical cats, Charlie returns the photograph of the missing baby to its rightful owner, a bookstore owner named Julia Ingledew. Julia asks Charlie to find her missing Emma, who was traded for a mysterious briefcase by her brother-in-law. Emma, now 10, is kept at Bloor's Academy and trapped under hypnosis by an endowed student, Manfred Bloor. With the help of Charlie's friend Benjamin and the loyal dog Runner Bean, as well as some of his family members, Charlie rescues Emma and discovers that his father is still alive, but also hypnotised by Manfred.

=== The Time Twister ===
Charlie Bone and the Time Twister in the US.

In 1916, Charlie's great-great-uncle, Henry Yewbeam, is tricked into looking into the Time Twister while staying with his jealous cousin, Ezekiel Bloor. The Time Twister takes Henry from 1916 to the present day without ageing him. Charlie, at Bloor's Academy, witnesses his appearance and takes him to Mr. Pilgrim's room. However, the dog Blessed also sees this, and tells Billy Raven, an orphan who can communicate with animals and is acting as a spy for Ezekiel in return for the chance to be adopted. Ezekiel orders Billy to bring Henry to him. At midnight, Charlie goes down to the kitchens to find Cook, but comes across Henry directly. Henry says that he had met a "small lady in black", who had given him tea and sweets. It turns out the lady in black is Manfred Bloor's mother, who is cursed and can never leave the castle. Together they devise a plan: Henry will go in one of the canteen's freezers until the temperature is the same as winter in 1916, then look at the Time Twister and be transported back; Charlie will keep checking that he's still breathing. However, when they put their plan into action, the freezer door freezes shut. Hearing Charlie shout out, Cook comes running, and manages to heave the door open, revealing Henry who has turned blue and fainted of hypothermia. They take him back to Cook's top-secret quarters, where the Flames help revive him. Charlie then returns to his dormitory, with the help of a magical torch that Cook gives him which shows up details that aren't usually visible. Cook threatens Blessed not to tell Billy about her secret home or Henry. On his return to his dormitory, Charlie finds Billy, who has apparently just been bribed with cocoa. Charlie and his friends devise a plan to help Manfred's mother. She escapes through the Time Twister, while Charlie and Uncle Paton take Henry to live with his younger brother (and Paton's father), James, by the sea.

=== The Blue Boa ===
Charlie Bone and the Invisible Boy in the US

Paton Yewbeam goes on a secret mission to stop a terrible danger. Meanwhile, Grizelda Bone and her three sisters introduce Charlie to a pretty girl named Belle Donner who will go to Bloor's. At school the group finds out about an invisible boy named Ollie Sparks, who has been put in his condition by an ancient blue snake with feathers. They also find out that Mr. Boldova, an art teacher, is actually Ollie's brother, who is trying to save him. The group finds out that Belle is really Yolanda Yewbeam, who is a shape-shifter, and Charlie's great-great-great aunt. She hypnotises Mr. Boldova into leaving the school and Paton returns gravely ill. Charlie decides to visit Skarpo, but things don't go according to plan and Skarpo and his mouse escape. Luckily Cook finds Skarpo terrified of the present day, and Charlie agrees to return him home to his painting if Skarpo can help heal Paton.

=== The Castle of Mirrors ===
Charlie Bone and the Castle of Mirrors in the US

Billy Raven has been adopted by a mysterious and evil couple called the de Greys. The de Greys are endowed and have created a force field to trap him on the weekends to prevent him escaping. A distant relative of Billy's tries to adopt him, but ends up sacrificing himself to save Charlie's Uncle Paton. Manfred and Ezekiel brew trouble for all the endowed children. However, Ezekiel accidentally resurrects the Red King's wife Berenice, in the form of a white horse, when attempting to revive the King's evil son Borlath. Olivia Vertigo finds out she is endowed, with the ability to create illusions. Manfred is descenated from Borlath.

=== Charlie Bone and the Hidden King ===
Charlie goes to Bloor's Academy on a mission to find his father. One day, Charlie sees that all the pets in the neighborhood have gone missing. Charlie finds out there is a girl named Naren, and she is endowed. Her endowment is shadowing words across great distances, and together they bring all the pets back.

=== Charlie Bone and the Wilderness Wolf ===
Charlie Bone and the Beast in the US

Charlie Bone and his Uncle Paton are visiting Charlie's old house while his parents are out whale watching (on their second honeymoon). While there he finds that his whole upstairs floor area was ripped up and they find that there were people inside the house earlier. When Charlie goes to Bloor's Academy he finds a new boy is there that he has to guide around. His name is Dagbert Endless because his last names are "as endless as the seas". Dagbert's endowment is to drown other people, controlling water. Dagbert has to be around Charlie all the time, so he starts to drive his friends away by insulting them. Later Charlie finds out that his great Aunt Venetia will marry a man who has two young children.

Meanwhile, there is a weird howling that the whole town could hear. The town decides to call it the "wilderness wolf" and thinks that it's dangerous. When Charlie goes home for the weekend his Uncle gets bitten by a creature outside their house. He claims that the things were definitely not a wolf as everyone else thought, but more of a human. When the town holds a meeting, Charlie's friend Benjamin proposes the idea that Charlie's classmate Asa Pike might be the creature since earlier he betrayed Manfred Bloor and helped Charlie get his father back. Charlie's great Aunt Venetia dropped her new children at Ingledew's bookshop. Little Eric was endowed, but Miranda was not. When Charlie goes back to Bloor's he is told by Billy Raven that the Wilderness Wolf is shouting "Help". When there is gunshots one night Billy tells Charlie that he heard it howl "Father". Later that week Charlie wakes up to his friend Naren sending the message goodbye. When he tried to talk back Dagbert sees the message and Charlie confronts him. While talking Dagbert experiences wild symptoms, such as glowing and pain, and he keeps telling Charlie to get his Sea Gold Creatures from under his pillow. When he gets better Dagbert explains how it is his birthday and how he is now more powerful than his father. When Charlie goes home for the weekend Benjamin explains his plan about Asa Pike and Charlie thinks that could be right. He decides that he has to help Asa because Asa risked everything to help him and his father. So he, Olivia, Benjamin, and Runner Bean go into the forest looking for him. Instead, they find Asa's mother as they realize that Asa's father was shot and was now dead. On their way across a dangerous metal bridge, the water rises so high that Runner Bean was washed away. Charlie's wand (which was turned into a moth) ends up helping them from drowning and Charlie sees the Red King across the bridge. Benjamin goes off to find Runner Bean and Charlie and Olivia bring Mrs. Pike to the Pet's Cafe. There she explains her story of how she thought that Asa would be good at Bloors Academy with Manfred as his friend, but they explained how they took him away because of how he betrayed them. Charlie leaves and remembers that he has to pick up Billy's Rat from a Kettle store. When he gets there the lady gives him a strange kettle that gets warm when he was in danger.

Charlie and Billy make a plan to go save Asa from underground. When they go they see Asa in his beast form, but Charlie finds that Billy lost his endowment. They decide that he needs to change back into his human form before they can talk to him. When Billy uses his special candles and Charlie uses his wand (moth) Asa turns into his human form as they leave the area. They see the Red King and they agree that Asa should go with him. Asa thanks Charlie for helping him and leaves.

=== Charlie Bone and the Shadow of Badlock ===
Charlie Bone and the Shadow in the US

The enchanter Count Harken is back to take his revenge on the Red King's heirs, starting with Charlie Bone's family. Charlie's ancestors have been kidnapped and imprisoned in the dark, forbidding land of Badlock, and it's up to him to save them. Traveling through a painting to the terrifying countryside, Charlie and his best friend's dog, Runner Bean, take up the quest. However, when Runner Bean gets stuck in the painting, Charlie needs the help of his friends. Can they get past an army of trolls, rescue Runner Bean and Charlie's ancestors, and get out before it's too late, or will Count Harken finally succeed?

=== Charlie Bone and the Red Knight ===
The evil Bloors are collecting even more powerful and magical allies. In the early proceedings, these allies are just sinister whispers and shadow but later on, these allies are daylight robbers and descendants of Count Harken. The cronies are taking over the city and driving everyone away. Charlie is determined to stop them. However, with the Pets Cafe closed, Billy trapped in Badlock, and Olivia "taken over," it looks like Charlie's only hope is the mysterious Red Knight. In the meantime, Charlie and his friends are searching for a will that reveals everything including who really owns Bloor's Academy. Paton believes the Raven family rightfully owns it which means Billy could inherit the academy if the will can be found. However, Charlie is in for a surprise when the will is revealed. The Red Knight is revealed to be none other than Lyell Bone himself, who wanted to watch his son near to him, but in a disguise. The will is hidden in the church where Lyell played, and the academy is owned by the Bones. Manfred and Ezekiel die in a freak accident, and Dr. Bloor moves away, (presumably to Paris, where his wife lives), along with all the evil people in the city. Bloor's becomes Bone Academy, and is proclaimed the happiest school in the city. Billy is adopted by Lyell and Amy, Paton and Julia marry, and they move together to the bookstore. The book (and series) ends when Billy whispers to Charlie at the Pet's Cafe, "Tancred and Emma are holding hands."

== Characters ==
=== Children of the Red King ===
Charlie Bone is the protagonist of the series. He is descended from the Red King through his father (Lyell Bone) and from Mathonwy, a Welsh magician and friend of the Red King, through his mother (Amy Bone née Jones). Charlie can hear the voices of people in photographs and paintings. He can use his powers to talk to the people inside them and on some occasions he can take items from the paintings. He is of Yewbeam descent through his grandmother Grizelda Bone née Yewbeam and thus a distant cousin of both Manfred Bloor and Billy Raven.

Manfred Bloor is a hypnotist and is one of the main antagonists. He hypnotised Lyell Bone, causing Lyell to lose his memory. Midway through the series, Manfred's hypnotizing endowment recedes and he gains his ancestor Borlath's ability to produce and control fire. After undergoing a magical healing following a near-death experience, he regains his hypnotic powers.

Naren Bloor, Bartholemew Bloor's daughter, can send shadow words over great distances using moonbeams. She disappears and Charlie Bone ultimately learns that her family is on the boat Greywing, rather than Lyell and Amy Bone, as Lord Grimwald and some of the Bloors mistakenly believe.

Idith and Inez Branko are telekinetic twins, distantly related to Zelda Dobinsky.

Zelda Dobinski is descended from a long line of Polish magicians. Her endowment is telekinesis. She can move objects with her mind and is distantly related to Inez and Idith Branko. She leaves Bloor's Academy in the third book and goes to study Math in a university.

Beth Strong is a telekinetic and is close friends with the similarly-endowed Zelda. Thus, she supports the Bloors before inexplicably leaving the academy after the second book.

Dagbert Endless can control water and is the son of Lord Grimwald. His morality is directly influenced by the position of the moon, but he is generally a follower of the Bloors until the eighth book, when he becomes allied with Charlie Bone.

Dorcas Loom can bewitch clothing. She begins supporting the Bloors early in the series.

Bindi Loom is known to be endowed, but her power is unconfirmed. She supports Charlie and his friends until inexplicably leaving Bloor Academy after the second book.

Una Onimous, the niece of Orvil and Onoria Onimous, has the endowment of invisibility.

Asa Pike, a werebeast, turns into a monstrous creature in the prolonged absence of natural or magical light. He was Manfred's sidekick until book 5, when he helped Charlie and his friends by releasing the Red King. For this he was punished and later was rescued by Charlie Bone in book 6.

Billy Raven, an albino, has the ability to speak to animals. He is an orphan, and was briefly adopted in Book 4 by abusive parents. He is adopted by the Bones at the end of the final book.

Lysander Sage descended from an African wise man and can call up his spirit ancestors. Lysander is Tancred's best friend. Lysander has two sisters, Hortense and Alexandra, who are both unendowed; he later gains an unnamed other sibling. He inherited his ability from his mother, Jessamine Sage. Lysander's father is a powerful judge in the city. Lysander also is good friends with Charlie Bone.

Eric Shellhorn can bring any stone statue to life. He lives with his stepmother Venetia Yewbeam because his sister (Miranda) and father (Arthur) escaped from the city. Venetia poisoned a shawl which stopped Eric's mother's heart, then made Arthur marry her.

Gabriel Silk can feel scenes and emotions through the clothing of others. He comes from a long line of psychics. He becomes friends with Charlie early in the series.

Joshua Tilpin can control magnetism and descended from Lilith, the Red King's oldest daughter, and Harken, the evil enchanter who married her.

Emma Tolly can turn into birds and fly, and is an excellent artist specialising in drawing birds. She was hypnotized by Manfred Bloor for eight years and renamed Emilia Moon. Charlie and his friends rescue her in the first book. She lives with her aunt, Julia Ingledew because her parents died and her previous guardian made the mistake of giving her to the Bloors. She saved Tancred from drowning and started dating Tancred at the end of the last book.

Tancred Torsson is a storm-bringer. His Scandinavian ancestor was named after the thunder god, Thor. Tancred can summon wind, thunder, snow, rain, and lightning. He is also a very dear friend of Lysander Sage. Tancred was also almost drowned by Dagbert Endless but rescued by the Flames in the seventh book.

Olivia Vertigo is an illusionist, but she does not discover her endowment until the fourth book. She is an aspiring actress and is constantly changing her appearance, especially her hair colour.

=== Other endowed characters ===
Alice Angel is a witch and godmother to Olivia Vertigo. Her opposite is Titania Tilpin. She took care of Mr. Crowquill (Billy Raven's guardian) until he died saving Charlie's uncle Paton.

Cook (Treasure) is the 'lodestone' at Bloor's. She keeps the balance between different factions of the Red King's descendants. She is currently hiding from Lord Grimwald, whom she refused to marry when she was younger. Cook is endowed with tranquility. She lives in a series of underground rooms in her kitchen.

Dr. Saltweather is immune to water. He becomes headmaster to Bone Academy (renamed after the Bloors left).

Titania Tilpin, mother of Joshua Tilpin and also known as Miss Chrystal, is a witch. A former teacher at Bloor's Academy and previously admired, she eventually leaves the Academy but continues working with the Bloors. Her opposite is Alice Angel.

Mr. Torsson is a powerful stormbringer like his son, Tancred.

Señor Alvaro has the power to make people believe things with images he puts in their minds.

Eustacia Yewbeam is a clairvoyant. She is the second of Charlie's great-aunts. She grows every single plant and herb in her garden, and in the third book Charlie and his friends had to steal a special herb to heal Paton. Once, she had posed as a sitter in Benjamin Brown's house while his parents were away, and let Asa Pike in the house to attack Runner Bean.

Paton Yewbeam is Charlie's great-uncle and is one of the few good Yewbeam characters. It is implied that Paton had kept his head down before Charlie was born, but since Charlie's efforts to fight against the Bloors, Paton has aided Charlie in his efforts. His endowment is electrical boosting, which causes him to blow up lightbulbs. Because of his endowment, Paton does not go out in daylight, for fear of exploding lights of intersections or in shops. Instead, Paton prefers to take walks alone at night. Uncle Paton lives in the house with Charlie's mother, Maisie (Charlie's maternal grandmother), Grandma Bone, and himself. He is Grandma Bone's brother and is 20 years younger than she is. Paton has a developing relationship with Julia Ingledew, whom he marries in the last book. Paton is also a historian. He is constantly working on a book about the children of the Red King.

Venetia Yewbeam is the youngest and most cunning of the four Yewbeam sisters. She is the step-mother to Eric Shellhorn. She is a designer of magic clothes. She used to be a smart woman, known to be frequently wearing red boots, but the arson of her home changed her completely. Now, she only thinks of revenge against Charlie and Uncle Paton. Venetia has been teaching and aiding Dorcas Loom, as they share the talent of bewitching clothes.

Samuel Sparks was disguised as an art teacher at Bloors Academy hoping to find his brother Ollie. Samuel can heat up rocks and make them sparkle. His brother Ollie was Invisible and after he was turned visible by Charlie Bone, he and Ollie Left Bloors Academy to go to the sparkling castle.

=== Unendowed characters ===
Amy Bone is Charlie's mother. She is married to Lyell Bone, who is presumed dead for most of the series. She lives with her mother, Maisie, her mother-in-law Grandma Bone, and her son Charlie. She is also descended from the Welsh magician, Mathonwy. She works at a greengrocer and is not endowed.

Lyell Bone is the husband of Amy Bone and the son of Grizelda Yewbeam and Montague Bone. Lyell disappeared after "breaking the rules"; he was looked down on for marrying Amy Bone because she wasn't endowed. Charlie was told that he was in a car accident, and that he drove into a quarry. In reality, Lyell was hypnotised by Manfred Bloor. Lyell is not endowed; however he is a very talented musician, especially in piano and the organ. In book 8, it is revealed that he is the heir to Bloor's Academy. Also, he and Charlie are the only two children of the Red King that are descendants of Borlath, Amadis, and Amoret.

Benjamin Brown is one of Charlie's best friends and lives across the street from him at number 12 Filbert Street. He has no endowment. He has a dog called Runner Bean.

Fidelio Gunn is not endowed, but is an excellent musician. He comes from a family of musicians and owns a deaf cat. He is one of Charlie's most loyal and best friends.

Julia Ingledew is the owner of Ingledew's Bookstore and is Emma Tolly's aunt. She has a relationship with Paton Yewbeam and marries him at the end of the last book.

Maisie Jones is Amy Bone's mother and descendant of Mathonwy, the Welsh magician and friend to the Red King.

Onoria Onimous, Orvil Onimous' wife and owner of the Pets Cafe, loves animals.

Orvil Onimous is the husband of Onoria Onimous and co-owner of the Pets Cafe. Also is an expert on the Red King and his history. He and his wife help Charlie and his friends in every way they can. Orvil was also almost killed by his doorman Norton Cross while he was cycling with his wife.

Grizelda Yewbeam is Lyell Bone's mother and Charlie Bone's grandmother. She is sister to Eustacia, Venetia, Lucretia and Paton Yewbeam. She is daughter to James Yewbeam and Solange Sourzac Yewbeam. She has no endowment. Although related to Charlie, she and her sisters, in league with the Bloors, are constantly trying to thwart him.

Lucretia Yewbeam is the eldest of Charlie's great-aunts and the younger sister of Grandma Bone. She is unendowed, but is just as nasty as her sisters. When her mother died under mysterious circumstances in Yewbeam castle, Lucretia and her sisters stayed and lived with Yolanda. She is the matron of Bloor's Academy.

== Charlie Bone Universe ==
Nimmo and Egmont have completed three volumes of a prequel, Chronicles of the Red King, released in paperback April 2011, April 2012 and August 2013. The Red King rather than Charlie Bone provides the connection but the Internet Speculative Fiction Database catalogues the whole as the "Charlie Bone Universe" series.

Chronicles of the Red King

1. The Secret Kingdom (April 2011, ISBN 978-1-4052-5732-9)
2. The Stones of Ravenglass (April 2012, ISBN 978-1-4052-5733-6)
3. Leopards' Gold (August 2013, ISBN 978-1-4052-5734-3)
