= Sherman Theatre =

Theatre in Cardiff, Wales

Coordinates: 51.48789°N 3.17658°W

- Theatr y Sherman
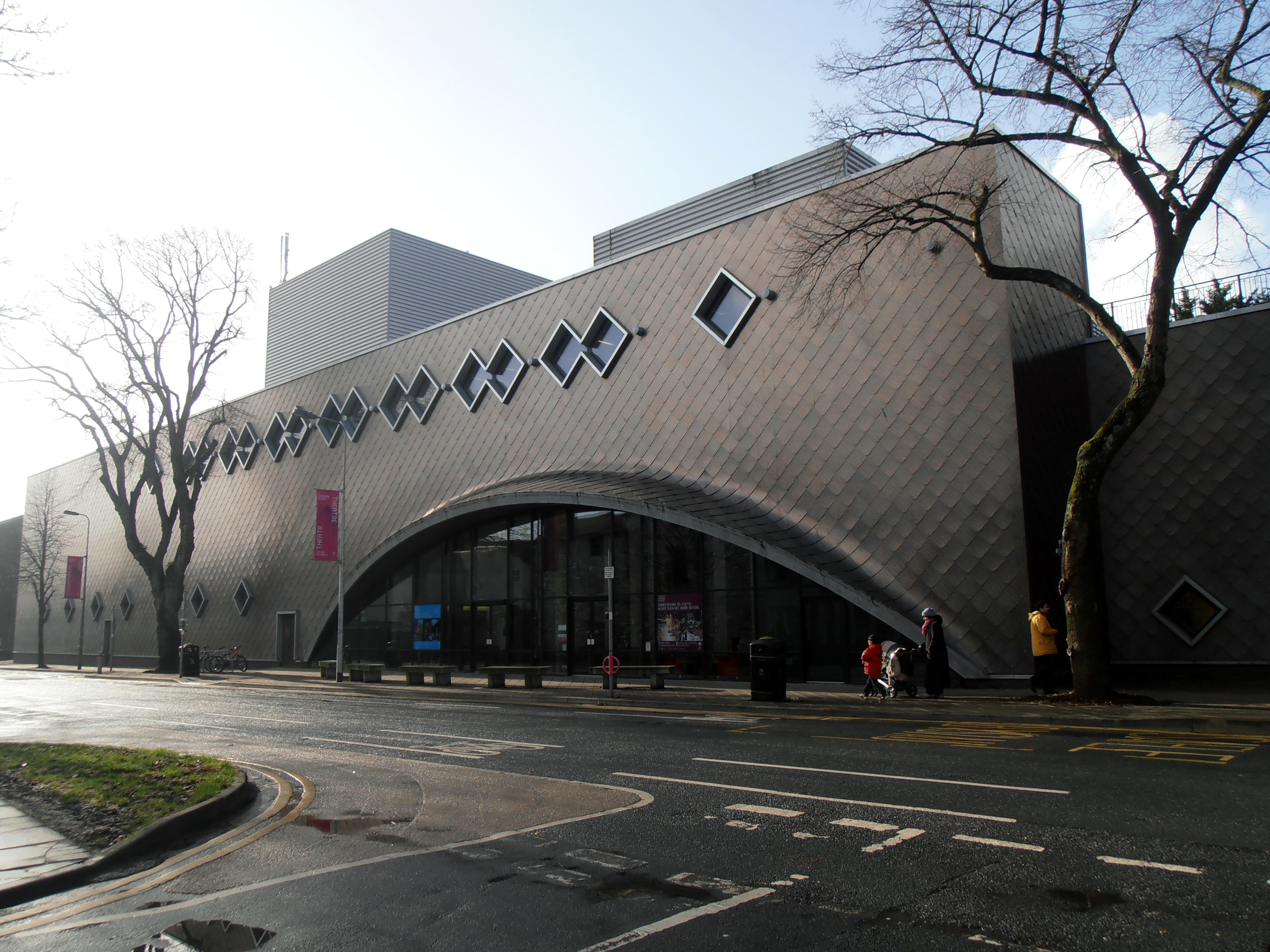
- Sherman Theatre in 2014
- Interactive map of Sherman Theatre
- Address: Senghennydd Road, Cathays; Cardiff; Wales
- Operator: Sherman Cymru Charity
- Capacity: Main house: 452; Studio: 100
- Events: Theatre; Comedy
- Public transit: Cathays railway station

Construction
- Opened: 1973

Website
- www.shermantheatre.co.uk

The Sherman Theatre (Welsh: Theatr y Sherman) is a venue in the Cathays district of Cardiff. It was built as a twin-auditorium venue in 1973 with financial support from University College Cardiff (now Cardiff University). Sherman Cymru was the name of the Sherman Theatre between 2007 and 2016 when the name changed back to Sherman Theatre.

The theatre is named after the Sherman brothers, the founder of Sherman's Football Pools, who financed its construction.

== History ==
C. W. L. Bevan, principal of University College Cardiff (now Cardiff University) worked on the original proposal, and funding was from the Harry & Abe foundation. The Sherman Theatre opened on 3 October 1973 with a screening of Ken Russell's The Savage Messiah. It was officially opened on 23 November 1973 by the Duke of Edinburgh.

Between 1990 and 2006 the artistic director of the Sherman was Phil Clark. Between 1993 and 1997 some plays were filmed for television by HTV under the series title The Sherman Plays. The current artistic director of the theatre is Joe Murphy.

The Sherman Theatre Company and Sgript Cymru merged in April 2007 to form a new company, called Sherman Cymru, based at the Sherman Theatre.

== Building and facilities ==
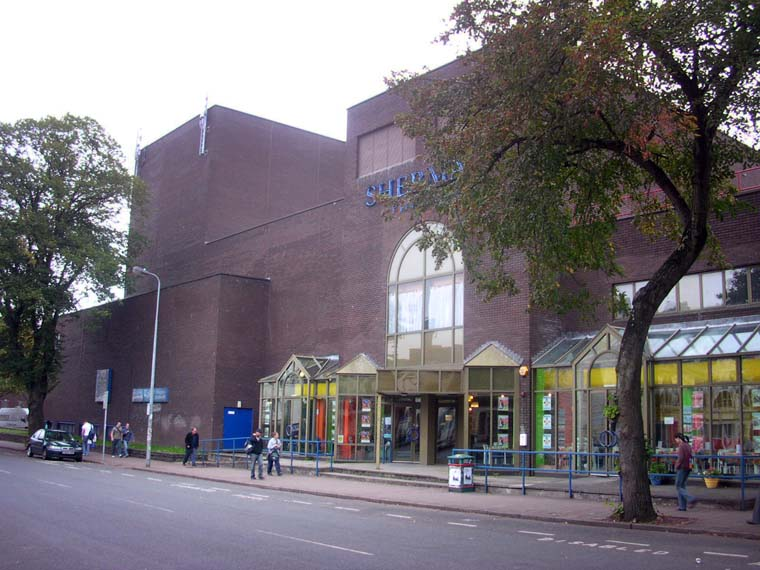
The Sherman Theatre in 2004 before the refurbishment in 2010–12

The theatre was originally designed by Alex Gordon and Partners in the same dark-brown brick as the Cardiff University Students' Union building next door, and was completed in 1973. It was modernised and refurbished in 2010–12 by Jonathan Adams, internally reorganised and with a distinctive new metal-clad facade.

There are two performance spaces: the main auditorium with 452 seats, and the studio / arena which seats 100.

== Awards ==
The Sherman won the UK Theatre Award for "Best New Play 2015", for Gary Owen's Iphigenia in Splott. Sophie Melville's performance in this production received The Stage Award for Acting Excellence at the Edinburgh Fringe Festival in 2015. The production transferred to the Royal National Theatre's Temporary Theatre in 2015, making this the first Welsh play to transfer straight to the National Theatre. Iphigenia in Splott won the James Tait Black Memorial Prize for Drama in 2016.

Gary Owen and Rachel O'Riordan's next collaboration, Killology, won the award for Outstanding Achievement at an Affiliate Theatre at the Olivier Awards in 2018.

The Sherman won the Edinburgh Fringe First award and a Herald Angel Award in 2008 for their touring play Deep Cut, which dramatised the real-life deaths of four trainees at Deepcut Army Barracks.

Sherman Theatre won Regional Theatre of the Year Award at The Stage Awards 2018.

Azuka Oforka won The Stage Debut Award for Best Writer in 2024 for her play The Women of Llanrumney, which was premiered at Sherman earlier in the same year.

== Artistic directors by year ==
- Geoffrey Axworthy: 1973-1988
- Mike James: 1988-1989
- Phil Clark: 1990-2006
- Chris Ricketts: 2006-2014
- Rachel O'Riordan: 2014-2019
- Joe Murphy: 2019-2025
- Francesca Goodridge: 2026-present
