= Steve Marmion =

Steve Marmion is an English theatre director. He trained at the University of Glamorgan and the Welsh College of Music and Drama. He was the artistic director of the Soho Theatre, having taken over from Lisa Goldman in 2010. He is a former associate director at the Royal Shakespeare Company. Since joining Soho Theatre the audiences have more than trebled to over 230000 people a year. 2015/16 saw him launch a new vision for the company - including an additional venue, increased touring and a new digital platform - and open a show in each of the capital cities of the UK and Ireland.
