= Michael Carroll (Irish writer) =

Irish writer (born 1966)

- Born: 21 March 1966 (age 60); Dublin, Ireland
- Occupation: Novelist
- Spouse: Leonia (née Mooney)
- Writing career
- Pen name: Jaye Carroll, Sprout
- Genres: Science fiction, romantic fiction
- Website: michaelowencarroll.com

Michael Owen Carroll (born 21 March 1966) is an Irish writer of novels and short stories for adults and children. He is best known for his series of superhero novels The New Heroes (called Quantum Prophecy in the US), and for his romantic fiction under the name Jaye Carroll. He also writes Judge Dredd for 2000 AD and the Judge Dredd Megazine.

== Biography ==
After leaving school at sixteen, Carroll worked as a postman. He moved into computer programming in 1985, at the age of nineteen. In 1990 he met his future wife, Leonia Mooney, at the first Octocon (the modern series of Irish National Science Fiction Conventions). He was an Octocon committee member in 1992, 1997 and 2003–2004, and in 2004 he succeeded James Brophy as chairperson, overseeing a successful convention, after the event took a break in 2003, with guest-of-honour Tanith Lee.

He published his first novel, The Last Starship, in 1993, and he became a full-time writer in 1999. He also maintains a website of humorous articles about the history of British comics, called Rusty Staples.

== Bibliography ==
=== Novels and novellas ===
- Moonlight (ISBN 978-0862783549, O'Brien Press, October 1993) Published in Italy as "Chi Ha Rapito Chiarodiluna" and in Canada as Clair-De-Lune
- She Fades Away (ISBN 978-1853716218, Poolbeg Press, April 1996) German: Die Schrift im Spiegel
- The Throwback (ISBN 978-1587153921, Cosmos Books, July 2001)
- Renegade (ISBN 978-1587153938, Cosmos Books, August 2001)
- Razorjack: Double-Crossing (ISBN 978-0983223832, Com.X Books, May 2011)
- The Cold Light of Day (Abaddon Books, 31 July 2013)
- The Third Law (Abaddon Books, 11 June 2014)
- The Righteous Man (Abaddon Books, 2016)
- Judges: The Avalanche (ISBN 978-1-78108-565-3, Abaddon Books, May 2018)
- The Process of Elimination (Abaddon Books, 2018)
- For I Have Sinned (Abaddon Books, 2019)
- Fallen Angel (Abaddon Books, 2020)

The Third Law, The Process of Elimination, and For I Have Sinned (which were e-books) were collected in an omnibus paperback volume called Rico Dredd: The Titan Years in 2019.

==== Pelicos Trilogy ====
- The Last Starship (ISBN 1-58715-389-0, Cosmos Books, July 2001. Originally published as ISBN 1-897751-15-X, Aran Book Publishers, June 1993)
- Reclaiming the Earth (ISBN 1-58715-390-4, Cosmos Books, July 2001)
- The Dead Colony (ISBN 1-58715-391-2, Cosmos Books, July 2001)

==== Published under the name Jaye Carroll ====
- If the Shoe Fits (978-1853719578, Poolbeg, March 2000) Polish title: XXL (Amber, 2002)
- The Sweetest Feeling (ISBN 978-1842230497, Poolbeg Press, July 2001) Polish title: Smak Zemsty (Amber, 2002)
- Loving the Stars (ISBN 978-1842230695, Poolbeg Press, June 2002) Polish title: Gwiazda Estrady (Amber, 2003)
- Looking for Mr. Wrong (ISBN 978-1842231487, Poolbeg Press, August 2004)

==== The New Heroes ====
The New Heroes series (known in America as Quantum Prophecy) includes:

- The Quantum Prophecy (ISBN 978-0007210923, HarperCollins, January 2006) United States title: The Awakening (ISBN 0399247254, Philomel Books, April 2007)
- Sakkara (ISBN 978-0007210930, HarperCollins, October 2006) United States title: The Gathering (ISBN 978-0399247262, Philomel Books, July 2008)
- Absolute Power (ISBN 978-0007210947 HarperCollins, July 2007) United States title: The Reckoning (ISBN 978-0399247279, Philomel Books, May 2009)
- Super Human (ISBN 978-0399252976, Philomel Books, May 2010)
- The Ascension (ISBN 978-0399256240, Philomel Books, June 2011)
- Stronger (ISBN 978-0399257612, Philomel Books, June 2012)
- Hunter (ISBN 978-0399163678, Philomel Books, May 2014)
- Crossfire (ISBN 978-1517394479, MaxEdDal Publications, October 2015)
- The Chasm (ISBN 978-1547067794, MaxEdDal Publications, June 2017)

=== Short stories ===
- The New Heroes: Superhuman(MaxEdDal Publications, November 2007) A collection of stories set in the universe of The New Heroes:
  - "A Decade Without Heroes"
  - "What I Did on My Holidays"
  - "The Offer"
  - "Pressure"
  - "The Footsoldiers"
  - "Out of Sight"
  - "Flesh and Blood"
  - "Scholarship Boy"
  - "One Million"
- Emerald Eye (ISBN 0-95347844-0, Aeon Press Books, 2005):
  - "In Dublin's Veracity" (Reprinted as part of the anthology. Originally published in Albedo 1 #7)
- FTL:
  - Issue 4 (1990): "The Hummingbirds" (First published fiction)
  - Issue 8 (1991): "Sight Out of Mind"
  - Issue 10 (1991): "Return of the Wanderers"
- Moonpaper:
  - March 1992: "A Victory of Love"
  - March and April 1994: "The Mirror"
- First Contact:
  - Volume 1, Issue 2 (December 1992): "Fit the Last"
  - Issue 8 (1993): "A Sense of Great Pain"
- The Brentford Mercury:
  - Issue 1 (1993): "Hate Story"
  - Issue 2 (1995): "A Christmas Carroll" (As Michael Story)
  - Issue 12 (1998): "Jakes' Big Plan"
  - Issue 13 (1998): "Show Me a Place that Ain't Hell"
  - Issues 14–19 (1998–1999): "Ace Crikey: A Clear and Present Stranger" (Parts 1–6)
  - Issue 25 (2001): "Ace Crikey and the Reality Machine" (Originally published in Phase One #2)
  - Issues 30–32 (2002–2003): "Ace Crikey: You Can't Get There from Here" (Parts 1–3)
- Phase Three:
  - Issue 1 (1993): "Pelicos" (The basis for the trilogy of science fiction novels)
- Albedo 1
  - Issue 3 (1993): "Angels in Different Shapes"
  - Issue 7 (1995): "In Dublin's Veracity"
- Phase One
  - Issue 1 (1993): "On Glory Roads of Pure Delight"
  - Issue 2 (1994): "Ace Crikey and the Reality Machine"
- Shiver! (ISBN 1853713007 Poolbeg Press, January 1994):
  - "All Fall Down"
  - "Sweden: Riddarens grav"
  - "Ro, ro barnet"
- Chiller (ISBN 1853715123, Poolbeg Press, January 1995):
  - "The Sand"
- The Federation Times:
  - Summer 1995: "The Next Generation Game"
- Nightmares (ISBN 1853716324, Poolbeg Press, January 1996):
  - "Knick Knock"
- First Times (ISBN 1853717622, Poolbeg Press, 1997):
  - "Uneven Ground"
- Scream! No One Will Hear (ISBN 1853718785, Poolbeg, 1998):
  - "Last Night of the Holidays"
- Seekers (ISBN 9780861676002, Edco, the Educational Company of Ireland, 2000):
  - "Uneven Ground" (originally printed in First Times)
- The Last Starship (ISBN 1-58715-389-0, Cosmos Books, July 2001):
  - "Pelicos" (Reprinted as the short story that inspired the trilogy)
- Octocon Programme Books:
  - 2001: "Hitting the Deck"
  - 2004: "The Sproutbank Show"
- Eurocon Programme Books
  - 1997: "The Heart of Apollo"

=== Articles ===
- 2000ADReview.co.uk:
  - Sprout columns (2003–present)
- Judge Dredd Megazine
  - "Twenty Things to Remember when going to a Comic Convention" (Meg 245)
  - "Top Twenty extraordinary 'facts' about Alan Moore" (Meg 246)
  - "Top Twenty non-2000 AD related comics by 2000 AD creators" (Meg 250)

=== The Sprout Spinner ===
The Sprout Spinner is an interactive CD-ROM application made to accompany The Brentford Mercury for SproutLore. The short stories written for it by Michael Carroll were all based upon songs by his favourite pop group, Alphaville. Two of the stories had been published in the Alphaville fanzine Moonpaper.

=== Comics ===
- "Overman" (with art by Johnny Rothwell, in Phase Two No. 2, 1994)
- "By the Book" (as Sprout, with art by Bolt-01, in FutureQuake No. 4, 2005)
- "Deadline" (as Sprout, with art by Julia Bax, in FutureQuake No. 5, 2005)
- Time Twisters: "Back to the Führer" (with art by Gary Erskine, in 2000 AD #1566, 2007)
- Future Shocks: "Sanctuary" (with art by John Cooper (comics), in 2000 AD #1646, 2009)
- "Tales of the GI: In the Dark" (with art by Bolt-01, webcomic, 2000AD Review)
- GI Tales: "In the Zone" (with Dave Evans, Zarjaz (vol. 2) No. 5, May 2008)
- Sancho: "In Excess" (with art by Alan Nolan, in Sancho #5, 2008)
- ABC Warriors: "Crimea River" (with art by Dave Evans, Zarjaz (vol. 2) No. 7, May 2009)
- Razorjack: "A Glimpse of Summer" (with art by John Higgins, Razorjack Graphic Novel, Titan Books, 2013)
- Tales From the Black Museum:
  - "Dead Man's Gum" (with art by Eva De La Cruz, in Judge Dredd Megazine No. 298, May 2010)
  - "A Judge's First Duty" (with art by Tiernen Trevallion, in Judge Dredd Megazine No. 302, September 2010)
  - "The Invisible Bullet" (with art by Nick Dyer, in Judge Dredd Megazine No. 304, November 2010)
  - "Rising Angel" (with art by Nick Percival, in Judge Dredd Megazine No. 358, March 2015)
- Judge Dredd:
  - "Blood Culture" (with art by Jon Davis-Hunt, in Judge Dredd Megazine #306, February 2011)
  - "Salvage" (with art by David Roach, in 2000 AD #1715, January 2011)
  - "Creatures of Habit" (with art by Ben Willsher, in 2000 AD #1716, January 2011)
  - "In Control" (with art by Simon Fraser, in 2000 AD #1717, January 2011)
  - "Caterpillars" (with art by Bryan Talbot, coloured by Alwyn Talbot, in 2000 AD #1730, April 2011)
  - "California Babylon" (with art by Ben Willsher, in 2000 AD #1731–1734, April–May 2011)
  - "Day of Chaos: Downtime" (with art by Ben Willsher, in 2000 AD #1752, September 2011)
  - "Unchained" (with art by John Higgins, in Judge Dredd Megazine #316–317, November–December 2011)
  - "Old Man Time" (with art by Nick Dyer, in Judge Dredd Megazine #319–320, January–February 2012)
  - "The Greater Good" (text story, in Judge Dredd Megazine #325, July 2012)
  - "Debris" (with art by PJ Holden, in 2000 AD #1792-1796, July–August 2012)
  - "Heavy Ordnance" (with art by Smudge, in 2000 AD #1797, August 2012)
  - "Payback" (with art by PJ Holden, in 2000 AD #1801-1802, September 2012)
  - "All is Bright" (with art by John M. Burns, in Judge Dredd Megazine #331, January 2013)
  - "Violent Night" (with art by Ben Willsher, in 2000 AD #2013, December 2012)
  - "Sealed" (with art by John M. Burns, in 2000 AD #1816, January 2013)
  - "Wolves" (with art by Andrew Currie, in 2000 AD #1820-1822, February 2013)
  - "Cypher" (with art by Inaki Miranda, in 2000 AD #1824-1825, March 2013)
  - "Shotgun" (with art by John M. Burns, in Judge Dredd Megazine #335, May 2013)
  - "The Forsaken" (with art by PJ Holden, in 2000 AD #1830-1835, May 2013)
  - "New Tricks" (with art by Paul Davidson, in 2000 AD #1850-1854, September–October 2013)
  - "The Right Thing" (with art by Leigh Gallagher, in 2000 AD #2014, December 2013)
  - "Donner & Blitzin'" (with art by Duane Leslie, in Judge Dredd Megazine #343, January 2014)
  - "Squirm" (with art by Nick Dyer, in 2000 AD #1870-1872, February–March 2014)
  - "Traumatown" (with art by Nick Percival, in 2000 AD #1883–1887, May–June 2014)
  - "Cascade" (with art by Paul Marshall, in 2000 AD #1894-1899, August–September 2014)
  - "The Ghost of Christmas Presents" (with art by Karl Richardson, in 2000 AD #2015, December 2014)
  - "Blood of Emeralds" (with art by Colin MacNeil, in 2000 AD #1934–1939, June–July 2015)
  - "Let's Go to Work" (with art by Jake Lynch, in 2000 AD Sci-Fi Special 2015)
  - "Islands" (with art by Paul Marshall, in 2000 AD #1955, November 2015)
  - "Sleeping Duty" (with art by Nick Dyer, in 2000 AD #1956, November 2015)
  - "Street Cred" (with art by Paul Marshall, in 2000 AD #1962, January 2016)
  - "Ghosts" (with art by Mark Sexton, in 2000 AD #1963–1968, January–February 2016)
  - "The Gyre" (with art by Nick Percival, in Judge Dredd Megazine #368–370, February–April 2016)
  - "The Grindstone Cowboys" (with art by Colin MacNeil, in 2000 AD #1973–1977, March–April 2016)
  - "Dust to Dust" (with art by Henry Flint, in Judge Dredd Megazine #371–373, May–July 2016)
  - "The Lion's Den" (with art by PJ Holden, in 2000 AD #1978–1985, April–June 2016)
  - "Reclamation" (with art by Colin MacNeil, in 2000 AD #1986–1990, June–July 2016)
  - "From the Ashes" (with art by Carlos Ezquerra, in Judge Dredd Megazine #374, August 2016)
  - "The Carousel" (with art by Ben Wilsher, in Judge Dredd Megazine #375, September 2016)
  - "In Denial" (with art by Andrew Currie, in 2000 AD #2010, December 2016)
  - "Deep in the Heart" (with art by Tiernan Trevallion (episodes 1–3) and Henry Flint (4–8), in 2000 AD #2012–2019, January–February 2017)
  - "The Rubicon" (with art by Ben Wilsher, in Judge Dredd Megazine #380–381, February–March 2017)
  - "Third Person" (with art by Carl Critchlow, in Judge Dredd Megazine #385, July 2017)
  - "Ouroboros" (with art by Paul Marshall, in 2000 AD #2041–2044, July–August 2017)
  - "Black Snow" (with art by PJ Holden, in 2000 AD #2055–2060, November–December 2017)
  - "Echoes" (with art by Colin MacNeil, in 2000 AD #2061–2064, December 2017–January 2018)
  - "The Shroud" (with art by Paul Davidson, in 2000 AD #2065–2068, January–February 2018)
  - "The Paradigm Shift" (with art by Jake Lynch, in 2000 AD #2082–2086, May–June 2018)
    - Story ties in with Carroll's novel Judges: The Avalanche, published simultaneously.
  - "Judge Dredd vs Razorjack: 'This Corrosion' " (with art by John Higgins, in Judge Dredd Megazine #396–399, June–August 2018)
  - "The Long Haul" (with art by Mark Sexton, in 2000 AD #2126–2129, April–May 2019)
  - "The Fall of Barbarbara Grimm" (with art by Nick Dyer, in 2000 AD #2146–2149, August–September 2019)
  - "The Harvest" (with art by Nick Percival, in 2000 AD #2158–2161, November–December 2019)
  - "Plunder" (with art by Karl Richardson, in Judge Dredd Megazine #415–417, January–March 2020)
  - "Desperadlands" (with art by William Simpson, in 2000 AD #2213–2216, January 2021)
  - "Apotheosis" (with Maura McHugh, with art by James Newell, in 2000 AD Sci-Fi Special 2021)
  - "Biohazard" (with art by Ben Willsher, in 2000 AD Sci-Fi Special 2021)
  - "Easy Money" (with art by Simon Fraser, in 2000 AD #2231–2232, May 2021)
  - "Tread Softly" (with art by Simon Coleby, in 2000 AD #2257–2258, November 2021)
  - "The Right Thing" (with art by Leigh Gallagher, in Judge Dredd Megazine #439, January 2022)
- Cadet Dredd:
  - "Bad Seeds"(with art by Luke Horsman, in 2000 AD #2196, August 2020)
  - "Tooth and Claw"(with art by Nicolò Assirelli, in 2000 AD #2206, November 2020)
- Dreadnoughts: "Breaking Ground" (with art by John Higgins, in Judge Dredd Megazine #424–429, September 2020– March 2021)
- DeMarco, P.I.:
  - "The Whisper" (art by Steve Yeowell, in Judge Dredd Megazine #343–347, 2013–2014)
  - "Déjà Vu" (art by Steve Yeowell, in Judge Dredd Megazine #355–357, 2014–2015)
  - "Damocles" (art by Steve Yeowell, in Judge Dredd Megazine #367–370, 2015–2016)
- Jennifer Blood:
  - "Jennifer Blood: First Blood" #1–6 (art by Igor Vitorino, Dynamite Comics 2012–2013)
  - "Jennifer Blood" #25–36 (art by Eman Cassalos & Kewber Baal, Dynamite Comics 2013–2014)
- Action Pact: "The Radyar Recovery" (with art by Luke Horsman, in 2000 AD #2220, February 2021)
- Mayflies:
  - "Precious Cargo" (with art by Simon Coleby, in 2000 AD #2220, February 2021)
  - "The Way Forward" (with art by Simon Coleby, in 2000 AD #2246, August 2021)
- Proteus Vex:
  - "Another Dawn"(with art by Henry Flint, in 2000 AD #2162-2172, December 2019 - March 2020)
  - "The Shadow Chancellor"(with art by Jake Lynch, in 2000 AD #2212-2223, December 2020 - March 2021)
  - "Desire Paths"(with art by Jake Lynch, in 2000 AD #2226-2274, December 2021 - March 2022)

== Awards ==
- 2012: Nominated for "Favourite Newcomer Writer" Eagle Award
