= Jenny Nimmo =

British children's book author, born 1944

- Born: 15 January 1944 (age 82); Windsor, England
- Occupation: Writer
- Spouse: David Wynn Millward
- Children: 3
- Writing career
- Period: 1974–present
- Genres: Children's fantasy and adventure novels, picture books
- Notable works: The Snow Spider; Children of the Red King
- Website: http://jennynimmo.me.uk/

Jenny Nimmo (born 15 January 1944) is a British author of children's books, including fantasy and adventure novels, chapter books, and picture books. Born in England, she has lived mostly in Wales for 40 years. She is probably best known for two series of fantasy novels: The Magician Trilogy (1986–1989), contemporary stories rooted in Welsh myth, and Children of the Red King (2002–2010), featuring schoolchildren endowed with magical powers. The Snow Spider, first of the Magician books, won the second annual Nestlé Smarties Book Prize (Note: For two years there was a single Nestlé Prize for children's books. Three age categories were introduced for 1987 publications and retained as long as the prize continued. Nimmo and The Owl Tree won the 1997 prize in category 6 to 8 years, the middle age group also called "younger readers". By that time there was no overall prize.) and the 1987 Tir na n-Og Award as the year's best originally English-language book with an authentic Welsh background. The Stone Mouse was highly commended for the 1993 Carnegie Medal. (Note: Today there are usually eight books on the Carnegie shortlist. According to CCSU some runners up through 2002 were Commended (in 1954) or Highly Commended (in 1966). The latter distinction became approximately annual in 1979; there were 29 highly commended books in 24 years including Nimmo and one other in 1993.) Several others of hers have been shortlisted for children's book awards.

== Biography ==
Jenny Nimmo was born in Windsor, England. She was an only child, and her father died when she was five. She was a voracious reader as a child, which led her to write her own stories to share with friends.

After working for a time in theatre, Nimmo spent several years with the BBC, partly on adapting other writers' stories for television, including 40 episodes (eight "stories") for Jackanory readings. Her first book, The Bronze Trumpeter, began life as a television script. It was published by Angus & Robertson in January 1975.

That year, Nimmo married David Wynn Millward, a Welsh artist and illustrator. Their two daughters and one son were born between 1975 and 1980. She currently lives in Wales, sharing her time between writing and helping her husband with a summer art school.

Millward is the writer or illustrator of a few published books himself, including four collaborations with Nimmo (1994–2000, marked ‡ below). Nimmo and their younger daughter Gwen Millward have collaborated on one picture book written by Jenny and illustrated by Gwen, The Beasties (Egmont UK, 2010). Gwen's first published book as both writer and illustrator was Bear and Bird (Egmont, September 2012).

== Writer ==
=== Charlie Bone and the Red King ===
Her best-known work may be Children of the Red King, also known as the Charlie Bone series or Red King series, in which Charlie Bone's magical talent embroils him in the sinister intrigues of his new school. By 2006 Charlie Bone titles had been published in nine foreign-language editions. Translations into eleven other languages were in progress. (Note: "Jenny's Books" (copyright date 2006) lists forthcoming languages of translation Greek, Portuguese, Dutch, Serbian, Croatian, Norwegian, Vietnamese, Thai, Indonesian, Turkish and Romanian. Meanwhile it displays book covers for three to five volumes in each of nine foreign languages alongside those for the first six volumes in the British and American editions; the sixth was first published in 2007.) Originally it was the Red King Quintet after which Nimmo contracted for a new trilogy. The story climaxes in the fifth book and again in the eighth. Recently there is a new Red King series.

== Publications ==
=== Non-fiction ===
- An Interview with Jenny Nimmo by Wendy Cooling
  (London: Mammoth Books, 1999, ISBN 0749738626)

=== Short stories ===
- "Centuries of Stories"
- "Sisters"
- "Take Your Knee Off My Heart"
- "The Animals' Bedtime Story"
- "Your Late Dad"

=== Picture books ===
- The Bears Will Get You (1990)
- The Starlight Cloak (1990)
- The Witches and the Singing Mice (1993)
- Gwion and the Witch (Gwasg Gomer Legends from Wales, 1996)
- Branwen (Gomer Legends from Wales, 1997)
- Esmeralda and the Children Next Door (1999)
- The Strongest Girl in the World (2001)
- Something Wonderful (2001)
- Pig on a Swing (2003)
- The Beasties (2010), illustrated by Nimmo's daughter Gwen Millward

=== Chapter books ===
Box Boys

- The Box Boys and the Bonfire Cat (1999)
- The Box Boys and the Dog in the Mist (1999)
- The Box Boys and the Fairground Ride (1999)
- The Box Boys and the Magic Shell (1999)

Delilah

- Delilah and the Dogspell (1991)
- Delilah and the Dishwasher Dogs (1993)
- Delilah Alone (1995)

Other illustrated books

- Tatty Apple (1984)
- The Red Secret (1989)
- Jupiter Boots (1990)
- The Stone Mouse (1993)
- The Breadwitch (1993)
- Wilfred's Wolf (1994) ‡
- Ronnie and the Giant Millipede (1995)
- Granny Grimm's Gruesome Glasses (1995) ‡
- The Witch's Tears (1996)
- The Alien on the 99th Floor (1996)
- Hot Dog, Cool Cat (1997) ‡
- Seth and the Strangers (1997)
- The Owl Tree (1997)
- The Dragon's Child (1997)
- The Dog Star (1999)
- Toby in the Dark (1999)
- Ill Will, Well Nell (2000) ‡
- The Bodigulpa (2001)
- Tom and the Pterosaur (2001)
- Beak and Whisker (2002)
- Matty Mouse (2003)
- The Night of the Unicorn (2003)
- Invisible Vinnie (2003)

=== Novels ===
Children of the Red King

There are eight books in the series, all first published by Egmont Press in British trade paperback editions with cover art by David Wyatt.

1. Midnight for Charlie Bone (2002)
2. The Time Twister (2003)
3. The Blue Boa (2004)
4. The Castle of Mirrors (2005)
5. Charlie Bone and the Hidden King (2006)
6. Charlie Bone and the Wilderness Wolf (2007)
7. Charlie Bone and the Shadow of Badlock (2008)
8. Charlie Bone and the Red Knight (2009)

Five volumes have variant titles in the United States.

Chronicles of the Red King

1. The Secret Kingdom (2011)
2. The Stones of Ravenglass (2012)
3. Leopards' Gold (Egmont, August 2013, ISBN 978-1-4052-5734-3)

’ Novels linked to the ‘Children of the Red King’ Series’

1. ‘’Henry and the Guardians of the Lost’’ (2016)
2. ‘’Gabriel and the Phantom Sleepers’’ (2018)

The Magician Trilogy

In Britain this series has been published in one volume entitled The Snow Spider Trilogy.

1. The Snow Spider (1986)
2. Emlyn's Moon (1987); first US title, Orchard of the Crescent Moon
3. The Chestnut Soldier (1989)

Other novels

- The Bronze Trumpeter (Angus & Robertson, 1975)
- Ultramarine (1990)
- Rainbow and Mr Zed (1992), sequel to Ultramarine
- Griffin's Castle (1994)
- The Rinaldi Ring (1999)
- Milo's Wolves (2001)

‡ Four 55- to 64-page books are illustrated by Nimmo's husband David Wynn Millward (1994 to 2000).

== Adaptations ==
The Snow Spider and its sequels were adapted for television by the screenwriter Julia Jones, as three miniseries that HTV aired 1989 to 1991. The series introduced Osian Roberts as Gwyn Griffiths with Siân Phillips as grandmother Nain Griffiths, Robert Blythe and Sharon Morgan as his parents, and Gareth Thomas as Mr. Llewellyn. In December 2023, Amazon MGM Studios announced that a film adaptation of the novel, Midnight for Charlie Bone, is in development.
