= Jackie French bibliography =

This is a list of books by Australian author Jackie French (born 1953).

== Bibliography in order of publication (not including overseas editions) ==
=== 1980s ===
==== 1986 ====
- Organic Gardening in Australia

==== 1988 ====
- Natural Rose Growing: An Organic Approach to Gardening
- The Organic Garden Doctor
- Smudge

=== 1990s ===
==== 1990 ====
- Natural Control of Household Pests

==== 1991 ====
- Rain Stones
- The Roo that Won the Melbourne Cup

==== 1992 ====
- The Boy who Had Wings
- The Music from the Sea, Children of the Valley series

==== 1993 ====
- The Wilderness Garden: A Radical New View of Australian Growing Methods
- The Salad Garden
- Organic Control of Household Pests
- Organic Control of Common Weeds
- The Earth Gardeners Companion: A Month-by-Month Guide
- The Chook Book
- A to Z of Useful Plants
- The City in the Sand, Children of the Valley series
- The House of a Hundred Animals, Children of the Valley series
- Walking the Boundaries
- Hairy Charlie and the Frog (with Dee Huxley)

==== 1994 ====
- Twelve Bottles Popping: Home-Made Presents to Flip Your Lid
- Hairy Charlie and the Frog
- Hairy Charlie and the Pumpkin
- The Metal Men, Children of the Valley series
- Somewhere Around the Corner
- New Plants from Old
- Book of Lavender
- Book of Mint
- Book of Rosemary
- Book of Thyme
- Book of Chilli
- Book of Garlic
- Book of Parsley
- Book of Basil
- Jackie French's Guide to Companion Planting in Australia and New Zealand
- Switch! A Book of Home-Made Power, Water, and Garbage Systems
- Household Self Sufficiency

==== 1995 ====
- Mermaids
- Alien Games
- Annie's Pouch
- The Secret Beach
- Back Yard Self Sufficiency
- The Organic Garden Problem Solver
- Plants That Never Say Die
- Soil Food: 3,764 Ways to Feed Your Garden
- Jackie French's Top Ten Vegetables
- Jackie French's Cook Book

==== 1996 ====
- Mind's Eye
- The Tribe that Sang to Trees, Children of the Valley series
- A Wombat Named Bosco
- Beyond the Boundaries
- The Warrior: The Story of a Wombat
- The Pumpkin Book
- Yates Guide to Edible Gardening
- Growing Flowers Naturally

==== 1997 ====
- Dancing with Ben Hall and Other Yarns
- The Silver Eyes
- The Book of Unicorns
- Soldier on the Hill
- Making Money from Your Garden
- Summerland

==== 1998 ====
- A Phaery Named Phredde and Other Stories to Eat with a Banana, Phredde the Phaery series
- Daughter of the Regiment
- Felix Smith has Every Right to Be a Crocodile
- There's an Echidna at the Bottom of My Garden
- The Little Book of Big Questions
- How the Aliens from Alpha Centauri Invaded My Maths Class and Turned Me Into a Writer
- Seasons of Content
- Yates Guide to Herbs
- Jackie French's Household Herb Book
- The Little Book of Big Questions

==== 1999 ====
- Phredde and a Frog Named Bruce and Other Stories to Eat with a Watermelon, Phredde the Phaery series
- There's a Wallaby at the Bottom of My Garden
- Charlie's Gold
- Tajore Arkle
- Hitler's Daughter
- How to Guzzle Your Garden
- Natural Solutions
- Tajore Arkle
- The Small Book of Big Questions (UK edition)

=== 2000s ===
==== 2000 ====
- Lady Dance
- Burt and the Band
- Captain Purrfect
- Pigs Don't Fly
- Stamp, Stomp, Whomp
- The Book of Challenges
- Phredde and the Zombie Librarian and Other Stories to Eat with a Blood Plum, Phredde the Phaery series
- Missing You, Love Sara
- The Best of Jackie French: A Practical Guide to Everything from Aphids to Zucchini Chocolate Cake

==== 2001 ====
- The Secret Life of Santa Claus
- How the Finnegans Saved the Ship
- Phredde and the Temple of Gloom - A Story to Eat with a Mandarin, Phredde the Phaery series
- The Fascinating History of Your Lunch
- Dark Wind Blowing
- In the Blood, Outlands trilogy
- The House that Jackie Built
- The Café on Callisto, Café on Callisto series
- Earthly Delights

==== 2002 ====
- Ride the Wild Wind
- Phredde and the Leopard-Skin Librarian - A Story to Eat with a Dinosaur Apple, Phredde the Phaery series
- The White Ship
- The Space Bug
- Space Pirates on Callisto, Café on Callisto series
- Diary of a Wombat, Shaggy Gully books
- Blood Moon, Outlands trilogy

==== 2003 ====
- Too Many Pears!
- Bears Don't Bounce!
- My Mum the Pirate, Wacky Families series
- My Dog the Dinosaur, Wacky Families series
- Phredde and the Purple Pyramid - A Story to Eat with a Passionfruit, Phredde the Phaery series
- A Box Full of Phaeries, Phreddes and Fruit, Phredde the Phaery series
- Valley of Gold
- The Black House
- A War for Gentlemen
- Searching for Charlie
- Vampire Slugs on Callisto, Café on Callisto series
- Big Burps, Bare Bums and Other Bad-Mannered Blunders

==== 2004 ====
- Pete the Sheep, Shaggy Gully books
- Phredde and the Vampire Footie Team - A Story to Eat with an Orange at Half Time, Phredde the Phaery series
- My Dad the Dragon, Wacky Families series
- My Uncle Gus the Garden Gnome, Wacky Families series
- Tom Appleby, Convict Boy
- Rocket Your Child into Reading
- Flesh and Blood, Outlands trilogy
- To the Moon and Back

==== 2005 ====
- Phredde and the Ghostly Underpants - A Story to Eat with a Mango, Phredde the Phaery series
- Phredde and the Runaway Ghost Train, Phredde the Phaery series
- The Secret World of Wombats
- My Uncle Wal the Werewolf, Wacky Families series
- They Came on Viking Ships
- Grim Crims & Convicts: 1788-1820, Fair Dinkum Histories
- How to Scratch a Wombat

==== 2006 ====
- Josephine Wants to Dance, Shaggy Gully books
- My Gran the Gorilla, Wacky Families series
- My Auntie Chook the Vampire Chicken, Wacky Families series
- Macbeth and Son
- One Perfect Day
- The Goat who Sailed the World, Animal Heroes series
- Shipwreck, Sailors & 60,000 Years: Before 1788, Fair Dinkum Histories

==== 2007 ====
- The Shaggy Gully Times, Shaggy Gully books
- My Pa the Polar Bear, Wacky Families series
- Pharaoh
- New Plants from Old: Simple, Natural, No-Cost Plant Propagation
- The Wilderness Garden: Beyond Organic Gardening
- The Day I Was History
- The Dog who Loved a Queen, Animal Heroes series
- Rotters and Squatters: 1820-1850, Fair Dinkum Histories
- Gold, Graves and Glory: 1850-1880, Fair Dinkum Histories
- Pharaoh

==== 2008 ====
- Emily and the Big Bad Bunyip, Shaggy Gully books
- One Big Wacky Family, Wacky Families series
- The Wonderful World of Wallabies and Kangaroos
- How High Can a Kangaroo Hop?
- A Rose for the Anzac Boys
- The Camel who Crossed Australia, Animal Heroes series
- A Nation of Swaggies & Diggers: 1880-1920, Fair Dinkum Histories

==== 2009 ====
- The Night They Stormed Eureka
- Baby Wombat's Week, Shaggy Gully books
- The Donkey who Carried the Wounded, Animal Heroes series
- Lessons for a Werewolf Warrior, School for Heroes series
- Wonderfully Wacky Families, Wacky Families series
- The Wombat and the Great Poohjam
- Weevils, War & Wallabies: 1920-1945, Fair Dinkum Histories
- Backyard Self Sufficienty

=== 2010s ===
==== 2010 ====
- A Waltz for Matilda
- Queen Victoria's Underpants
- Oracle
- Dance of the Deadly Dinosaurs, School for Heroes series
- The Horse who Bit a Bushranger, Animal Heroes series
- Rockin', Rollin, Hair & Hippies: 1945-1972, Fair Dinkum Histories
- A Year in the Valley

==== 2011 ====
- Booms, Busts and Bushfires: 1972—, Fair Dinkum Histories
- The Tomorrow Book
- Christmas Wombat, Shaggy Gully books
- Nanberry: Black Brother White
- Flood

==== 2012 ====
- A Day to Remember
- Elephant Alert
- Gorilla Grab
- Tiger Tangle
- Shark Attack
- Pennies for Hitler
- Dingo: The Dog who Conquered a Continent
- The Girl from Snowy River
- Queen Victoria's Christmas

==== 2013 ====
- The Road to Gundagai
- Let the Land Speak
- Dinosaurs Love Cheese
- Wombat Goes to School
- French, Jackie (2013), Refuge, Sydney South, NSW HarperCollins Publishers, ISBN 978-0-7322-9617-9
- Nanberry: Black Brother White
- Hitler’s Daughter: the play [with Tim McGary, Eva De Cesare and Sandie Eldridge]

==== 2014 ====
- I am Juliet
- Good Dog Hank!
- The Book of Horses & Unicorns
- The Hairy-nosed Wombats Find a New Home
- To Love a Sunburnt Country
- I Spy a Great Reader
- The Beach They Called Gallipoli

==== 2015 ====
- Birrung The Secret Friend (Secret Histories : Book 1)
- The Hairy Nosed Wombats Find A New Home, illustrated by Sue deGennaro
- Good Dog Hank, illustrated by Nina Rycroft
- Ophelia: Queen of Denmark
- Fire, illustrated by Bruce Whatley
- Horace the Baker's Horse, illustrated by Peter Bray
- The Ghost by the Billabong (The Matilda Saga : Book 5)

==== 2016 ====
- Barney and the Secret of the Whales (Secret Histories : Book 2)
- Dinosaurs Love Cheese, illustrated by Nina Rycroft
- The Beach They Called Gallipoli, illustrated by Bruce Whatley
- Grandma Wombat, illustrated by Bruce Whatley
- Josephine Wants To Dance (10th Anniversary Edition), illustrated by Bruce Whatley
- Diary of a Wombat Big Book (Giant Picture Storybooks), illustrated by Bruce Whatley
- Baby Wombat's Week Big Book (Giant Picture Storybooks), illustrated by Bruce Whatley
- The Diary of William Shakespeare, Gentleman
- Rain Stones 25th Anniversary Edition
- If Blood Should Stain the Wattle (The Matilda Saga)

==== 2017 ====
- The Secret of the Black Bushranger (The Secret History Series)
- Miss Lily's Lovely Ladies (Miss Lily series #1)
- Millie Loves Ants, illustrated by Sue deGennaro
- Goodbye Mr Hitler
- Third Witch
- Wombat Wins, illustrated by Bruce Whatley
- If Blood Should Stain the Wattle (The Matilda Saga)
- Wombat Goes to School, illustrated by Bruce Whatley
- Koala Bare, illustrated by Matt Shanks
- Facing the Flame (The Matilda Saga: Book 7)
- With Love from Miss Lily (A Christmas Story) ebook

==== 2018 ====
- Barney and the Secret of the French Spies (The Secret History Series)
- Cyclone, illustrated by Bruce Whatley
- Shipwreck, Sailors & 60,000 Years (Fair Dinkum Histories Series: Book 1), illustrated by Peter Sheehan
- Grim Crims & Convicts (Fair Dinkum Histories #2), illustrated by Peter Sheehan
- The Lily and the Rose (Miss Lily series #2)
- Drought, illustrated by Bruce Whatley
- Rotters and Squatters (Fair Dinkum Histories #3), illustrated by Peter Sheehan
- Gold, Graves and Glory(Fair Dinkum Histories #4), illustrated by Peter Sheehan
- Christmas Lilies (A Christmas Story) ebook

==== 2019 ====
- The Lily in the Snow (Miss Lily series #3)
- Pirate Boy of Sydney Town

==== 2020 ====
- Lilies, Lies and Love (Miss Lily series #4)

==== 2023 ====
- Becoming Mrs Mulberry
- Secret Sparrow

== Picture books ==
1. Diary of a Wombat (2002)
2. Pete the Sheep (2004), published as Pete the Sheep-Sheep in the US
3. The Secret World of Wombats (2005), published as How to Scratch a Wombat in the USA
4. Josephine Wants to Dance (2006), published as Josephine Loves to Dance in the US
5. The Shaggy Gully Times (2007)
6. Emily and the Big Bad Bunyip (2008)
7. Baby Wombat's Week (2009)
8. Queen Victoria's Underpants (2010)
9. Christmas Wombat (2011)
10. The Tomorrow Book (2011) (with Sue Degennaro)
11. Queen Victoria's Christmas (2012)
12. Dinosaurs Love Cheese (2013) (with Nina Ryecroft)
13. Wombat Goes to School (2013)
14. Good Dog Hank! (2014) (with Sue Degennaro)
15. The hairy nosed wombats find a new home (with Sue Degennaro)
16. Fire
17. The beach they called Gallipoli
18. A Day to Remember (with Mark Wilson)
19. Two Many Pears! (with Bruce Whatle)
20. Hairy Charlie and the Frog (1994), illustrated by Dee Huxley
21. Hairy Charlie and the Pumpkin (1994), illustrated by Dee Huxley
22. Mermaids (1995)
23. Pigs Don't Fly (2000)
24. Too Many Pears! (originally titled Pear-Pinching Pamela) (2003), illustrated by Bruce Whatley
25. Bears Don't Bounce! (2003)
26. Flood (2011)
27. A Day to Remember (2012)
28. The Fire Wombat (2020), illustrated by Danny Snell

== Junior fiction ==
=== Short story collections ===
1. Rain Stones (1991)
2. Alien Games (1995)
3. Mind's Eye (1996)
4. Dancing with Ben Hall and Other Yarns (1997), illustrated by Gwen Harrison
5. The Silver Eyes (1997), illustrated by David Miller
6. The Book of Unicorns (1997)
7. Ride the Wild Wind (2002)

=== Animal Rescue series ===
1. Elephant Alert (2012)
2. Gorilla Grab (2012)
3. Tiger Tangle (2012)
4. Shark Attack (2012)

=== Café on Callisto series ===
illustrated by Sarah Baron

1. The Café on Callisto (2001)
2. Space Pirates on Callisto (2002)
3. Vampire Slugs on Callisto (2003)

=== The Children of the Valley series ===
illustrated by Victoria Clutterbuck

1. The Music from the Sea (1992)
2. The City in the Sand (1993)
3. The House of a Hundred Animals (1993)
4. The Metal Men (1994)
5. The Tribe that Sang to Trees (1996)

=== Phredde the Phaery series ===
illustrated by Stephen Michael King

1. A Phaery Named Phredde and Other Stories to Eat with a Banana (1998)
2. Phredde and a Frog Named Bruce and Other Stories to Eat with a Watermelon (1999)
3. Phredde and the Zombie Librarian and Other Stories to Eat with a Blood Plum (2000)
4. Phredde and the Temple of Gloom - A Story to Eat with a Mandarin (2001)
5. Phredde and the Leopard-Skin Librarian - A Story to Eat with a Dinosaur Apple (2002)
6. Phredde and the Purple Pyramid - A Story to Eat with a Passionfruit (2003)
7. Phredde and the Vampire Footie Team - A Story to Eat with an Orange at Half Time (2004)
8. Phredde and the Ghostly Underpants - A Story to Eat with a Mango (2005)
9. Phredde and the Runaway Ghost Train (2005)
- A Box Full of Phaeries, Phreddes and Fruit (compilation of the first three books in the series) (2003)

=== School for Heroes series ===
illustrated by Andrea F. Potter

1. Lessons for a Werewolf Warrior (2009)
2. Dance of the Deadly Dinosaurs (2010)

=== Wacky Families series ===
illustrated by Stephen Michael King

1. My Mum the Pirate (2003), published as My Mom the Pirate in the US
2. My Dog the Dinosaur (2003)
3. My Dad the Dragon (2004)
4. My Uncle Gus the Garden Gnome (2004)
5. My Uncle Wal the Werewolf (2005)
6. My Gran the Gorilla (2006)
7. My Auntie Chook the Vampire Chicken (2006)
8. My Pa the Polar Bear (2007)
9. One Big Wacky Family (2008) (compilation of the first to fourth books in the series)
10. Wonderfully Wacky Families (2009) (compilation of the fourth to eighth books in the series)

=== Historical fiction ===
==== Animal Heroes series ====
1. The Goat who Sailed the World (2006)
2. The Dog who Loved a Queen (2007)
3. The Camel who Crossed Australia (2008)
4. The Donkey who Carried the Wounded (2009)
5. The Horse who Bit a Bushranger (2010)
6. Dingo: The Dog who Conquered a Continent (2012)

==== Miscellaneous ====
1. Somewhere Around the Corner (1994)
2. Soldier on the Hill (1997)
3. Daughter of the Regiment (1998)
4. Hitler's Daughter (1999)
5. Lady Dance (2000)
6. How the Finnegans Saved the Ship (2001)
7. The White Ship (2002)
8. Valley of Gold (2003)
9. Tom Appleby, Convict Boy (2004)
10. They Came on Viking Ships (2005), published as Slave Girl in the UK and Rover in the US
11. Macbeth and Son (2006)
12. Pharaoh (2007)
13. The Night They Stormed Eureka (2009)
14. Oracle (2010)
15. Nanberry: Black Brother White (2011)
16. Pennies for Hitler (June 2012) (companion volume to Hitler's Daughter)
17. The Angel of Waterloo (2021)
18. Secret Sparrow (November 2023)

=== Miscellaneous ===
1. The Roo that Won the Melbourne Cup (1991), illustrated by Carol McLean-Carr
2. The Boy who Had Wings (1992)
3. Walking the Boundaries (1993)
4. Annie's Pouch (1995), illustrated by Bettina Guthridge
5. The Secret Beach (1995)
6. A Wombat Named Bosco (1996), illustrated by Bettina Guthridge
7. Beyond the Boundaries (1996) (sequel to Walking the Boundaries)
8. The Warrior: The Story of a Wombat (1996), illustrated by Bettina Guthridge
9. Summerland (1997)
10. Felix Smith Has Every Right to Be a Crocodile (1998), illustrated by David Stanley
11. There's an Echidna at the Bottom of My Garden (1998), illustrated by Bettina Guthridge
12. There's a Wallaby at the Bottom of My Garden (1999), illustrated by David Stanley
13. Charlie's Gold (1999)
14. Tajore Arkle (1999)
15. Burt and the Band (2000), illustrated by Beth Norling
16. Captain Purrfect (2000), illustrated by Gus Gordon
17. The Space Bug (2002), illustrated by Mitch Vane
18. The Black House (2003)
19. One Perfect Day (2006), illustrated by Peter Bray
20. The Day I Was History (2007), illustrated by Christina Booth
21. The Wombat and the Great Poohjam (2009)

== Junior non-fiction ==
=== Fair Dinkum Histories ===
illustrated by Peter Sheehan

1. Shipwreck, Sailors & 60,000 Years: Before 1788 (2006)
2. Grim Crims & Convicts: 1788-1820 (2005)
3. Rotters and Squatters: 1820-1850 (2007)
4. Gold, Graves and Glory: 1850-1880 (2007)
5. A Nation of Swaggies & Diggers: 1880-1920 (2008)
6. Weevils, War & Wallabies: 1920-1945 (2009)
7. Rockin', Rollin, Hair & Hippies: 1945-1972 (2010)
8. Booms, Busts and Bushfires: 1972— (2011)

=== Miscellaneous ===
1. Twelve Bottles Popping: Home-Made Presents to Flip Your Lid (1994)
2. The Little Book of Big Questions (1998), illustrated by Terry Denton
3. How the Aliens from Alpha Centauri Invaded My Maths Class and Turned Me Into a Writer (1998)
4. How to Guzzle Your Garden (1999)
5. Stamp, Stomp, Whomp (2000)
6. The Book of Challenges (2000)
7. The Fascinating History of Your Lunch (2001)
8. Big Burps, Bare Bums and Other Bad-Mannered Blunders (2003)
9. To the Moon and Back (2004), written with Bryan Sullivan and illustrated by Gus Gordon
10. How to Scratch a Wombat (2005)
11. The Wonderful World of Wallabies and Kangaroos (2008)
12. How High Can a Kangaroo Hop? (2008), illustrated by Bruce Whatley

== Teen and young adult fiction ==
=== Outlands trilogy ===
1. In the Blood (2001)
2. Blood Moon (2002)
3. Flesh and Blood (also known as Blood Will Tell) (2004)

=== Historical fiction ===
1. A Rose for the Anzac Boys (2008)

=== The Matilda Series ===
1. A Waltz for Matilda (2010)
2. The Girl from Snowy River (The Matilda Series Book 2) (2012)
3. The Road to Gundagai (The Matilda Series Book 3) (2013)
4. To Love a Sunburnt Country (The Matilda Series Book 4) (2015)
5. The Ghost by the Billabong (The Matilda Series Book 5) (2015)
6. If Blood Should Stain the Wattle (The Matilda Series Book 6) (2017)
7. Facing the Flame (The Matilda Series Book 7) (2017)
8. The Last Dingo Summer (The Matilda Series Book 8) (2019)
9. Clancy of the Overflow (The Matilda Series Book 9) (2020)

=== Miscellaneous ===
1. Missing You, Love Sara (2000)
2. Dark Wind Blowing (2001)

== Adult fiction ==
1. A War for Gentlemen (2003)
2. To Love a Sunburnt Country (2014)
3. The Angel of Waterloo (2021)
4. Becoming Mrs Mulberry (2023)

== Adult non-fiction ==
1. Seasons of Content (1998)
2. Earthly Delights (2001)
3. The Secret Life of Santa Claus
4. Rocket Your Child into Reading (2004)
5. I Spy a Great Reader
6. A Year in the Valley (2010)
7. Let the Land Speak (2013)

== Gardening and ecology books ==
1. Organic Gardening in Australia (1986), published as 'Jacqueline French'
2. Natural Rose Growing: An Organic Approach to Gardening (1988), published as 'Jacqueline French'
3. The Organic Garden Doctor (1988), published as 'Jacqueline French'
4. Natural Control of Household Pests (1990), published as 'Jacqueline French'
5. The Wilderness Garden: A Radical New View of Australian Growing Methods (1993)
6. The Chook Book (1993)
7. The Salad Garden (1993)
8. Organic Control of Household Pests (1993)
9. Organic Control of Common Weeds (1993), revised edition published 1997
10. The Earth Gardeners Companion: A Month-by-Month Guide (1993)
11. The Chook Book (1993)
12. A to Z of Useful Plants (1993)
13. Book of Lavender (1994)
14. Book of Mint (1994)
15. Book of Rosemary (1994)
16. Book of Thyme (1994)
17. Book of Chilli (1994)
18. Book of Garlic (1994)
19. Book of Parsley (1994)
20. Book of Basil (1994)
21. Jackie French's Guide to Companion Planting in Australia and New Zealand (1994)
22. Switch! A Book of Home-Made Power, Water, and Garbage Systems (1994)
23. Household Self Sufficiency (1994)
24. New Plants from Old (1994)
25. Back Yard Self Sufficiency (1995)
26. The Organic Garden Problem Solver (1995)
27. Plants That Never Say Die (1995)
28. Soil Food: 3,764 Ways to Feed Your Garden (1995)
29. Jackie French's Top Ten Vegetables (1995)
30. Jackie French's Cook Book (1995)
31. The Pumpkin Book (1996)
32. Yates Guide to Edible Gardening (1996)
33. Growing Flowers Naturally (1996)
34. Making Money from Your Garden (1997)
35. Yates Guide to Herbs (1998)
36. Jackie French's Household Herb Book (1998)
37. The Household Herbal (1998)
38. Natural Solutions (1999)
39. The Best of Jackie French: A Practical Guide to Everything from Aphids to Zucchini Chocolate Cake (2000)
40. The House That Jackie Built (2001)
41. Earthly Delights (2001)
42. New Plants from Old: Simple, Natural, No-Cost Plant Propagation (2007), second edition of A to Z of Useful Plants (1994)
43. The Wilderness Garden: Beyond Organic Gardening (2007), second edition of The Wilderness Garden: A Radical New View of Australian Growing Methods (1993)
44. The Earth Gardener's Companion (2009)
45. Backyard Self Sufficiency (2009)

== Adaptations ==
1. Hitler's Daughter: The Play, based on Hitler's Daughter (1999) and adapted by Monkey Baa Theatre
2. Pete the Sheep: The Musical, also adapted by Monkey Baa Theatre
