= ACT Literary Awards =

Australian literary awards in the ACT

The ACT Literary Awards, formerly known as the ACT Writing and Publishing Awards, are a suite of Australian literary honours coordinated and presented annually by MARION (formerly the ACT Writers Centre). The awards recognise outstanding literary achievement in Canberra and surrounding regions, with categories spanning fiction, nonfiction, poetry, and children's literature. The suite also includes in memoriam prizes and funded mentorships that support both emerging and established writers.

== History ==
The ACT Writers Centre was established in 1994 to support writers in the Australian Capital Territory.

The inaugural ACT Writing and Publishing Awards were presented in 2004.

In 2022, the organisation was renamed MARION ACT, and the awards program evolved into the ACT Literary Awards, which now encompasses multiple categories across fiction, nonfiction, poetry, and children's literature. The suite also includes memorial prizes honouring distinguished individuals, as well as funded mentorships for emerging and established writers.

== Categories ==
In 2004, the Centre launched the ACT Writing and Publishing Awards, coordinated and presented annually to recognise excellence in local writing.

In 2022, the organisation rebranded as MARION, and the awards were briefly renamed the MARION Book Awards. Since then, the program has expanded and evolved into the ACT Literary Awards, coordinated by MARION as part of its annual programming. The awards now include categories for fiction, nonfiction, poetry, and children's literature, and also incorporate in memoriam prizes and funded mentorships supporting both emerging and established writers in the ACT and surrounding regions.

In 2023, MARION introduced the MARION Fellowship, a developmental opportunity open to emerging writers, regardless of location. In 2024, the Marion Halligan Award was established in memory of acclaimed Australian author Marion Halligan OAM. It is selected from across all categories of the ACT Literary Awards.

== List of winners ==
=== 2026 AWARDS ===
Fiction Traditional Publishing

- Winner: In the Name of the Trees by Merlinda Bobis (Spinifex Press)

Fiction Self-published

- Winner: To Heal a Lyrebird by Kate Liston-Mills

Nonfiction Traditional Publishing

- Winner: Versailles Mirrored: The Power of Luxury, Louis XIV to Donald Trump by Robert Wellington (Bloomsbury)
- Highly Commended: Playtime: A History of Australian Childhood by Emily Gallagher (Black Inc.)

Children's Traditional Publishing

- Winner - FICTION: The Drought Kangaroo by Jackie French, ill. Danny Snell (HarperCollins Australia)
- Winner - NONFICTION: Peculiar Parents by Stephanie Owen Reeder, ill. Ingrid Bartkowiak (NLA Publishing)
- Winner - OLDER READERS: Washpool by Lisa Fuller (Hachette Australia)

Poetry Traditional Publishing

- Winner: Wita Witalana by Paul Collis (Recent Work Press)
- Highly Commended: Arsenic Flower by Dakota Feirer (Hachette Australia)

The Anne Edgeworth Fellowship for Emerging Writers

Joint Award Winners: Kelsey Clifton and Katherine Hammersley

The Finding Beauty Poetry Prize

- First place: ‘Paper Crane’ by Lillace Kenta
- Second place: ’The Italian Chapel’ by Deborah Dawkings
- Shortlisted: ‘The Anatomy of My Parent’s Hands‘ by Michelle Brock
- Shortlisted: ‘She Collects Things‘ by Elizabeth Walton
- Honourable mentions: ‘On William Barton’ by Julie Hollitt, ‘Holding Still’ by Sara Pronger

The Marion Halligan Award The Dingo's Noctuary by Judith Nangala Crispin (Puncher & Wattman)

JUDGES 2026: Eugen Bacon, Frank Bongiorno, Helen Ennis, Dan Hogan, Subhash Jaireth, Ambelin Kwaymullina, Lucy Neave, Sandra Renew, Gabrielle Tozer, and Jen Webb.

=== 2025 AWARDS ===
30th Anniversary of MARION and the ACT Writers Centre 1995 - 2025

Fiction Traditional Publishing

- Winner: Compassion by Julie Janson (Magabala Books)
- Highly Commended: The Sea Captain's Wife by Jackie French (HarperCollins Australia)

Nonfiction Traditional Publishing

- Winner: Warra Warra Wai: How Indigenous Australians discovered Captain Cook, and what they tell about the coming of the Ghost People by Darren Rix and Craig Cormick (Scribner Australia)
- Highly Commended: Max Dupain: A Portrait by Helen Ennis (HarperCollins Australia)

Nonfiction Self-published

- Winner: An Unexpected Life: the inspiring stories of 12 migrant women and their new lives in Australia by Vesna Cvjetićanin
- Highly Commended: Australian Carillonists: respect for the past and a vision for the future by Melissa Bray

Children's Traditional Publishing

- Winner - YOUNGER READERS: Big, Big Love by Lisa Fuller, ill. Samantha Campbell (Magabala Books)
- Winner - MIDDLE-GRADE: Tigg and the Bandicoot Bushranger by Jackie French (HarperCollins Australia)
- Winner - YA FICTION: The Unexpected Mess of It All by Gabrielle Tozer (HarperCollins Australia)
- Highly Commended: Flora: Australia's Most Curious Plants by Tania McCartney (NLA Publishing)
- Highly Commended: Sensational Australian Animals by Stephanie Owen Reeder, ill. Cher Hart (CSIRO Publishing)

Poetry Traditional Publishing

- Winner: Makarra by Barrina South (Recent Work Press)
- Highly Commended: Refugia by Elfie Shiosaki (Magabala Books)

The Anne Edgeworth Fellowship for Emerging Writers

Elisa Cristallo, Matthew Crowe, and Deborah Huff-Horwood

The Marion Halligan Award Flora: Australia's Most Curious Plants by Tania McCartney (NLA Publishing)

The June Shenfield National Poetry Award

- First place: A metabolism of self by Krystle Herdy (VIC)
- Second place: 'This is a Recipe' by Elizabeth Walton (NSW)
- Third Place: 'Building' by Josephne Shevchenko (ACT)

The inaugural Finding Beauty Poetry Prize

- First place: 'As a Matter of Great Importance' by Alisha Brown
- Second place: 'Rosalie' by Cate Furey
- Shortlisted: ';' Annie O'Connell
- Shortlisted: 'Still Green' Sara Pronger

JUDGES 2025: Adrian Caesar, Paul Hetherington, Maya Hodge, Ayesha Inoon, Will Kostakis, Katrina Marson, Omar Musa, Bebe Oliver, Shannyn Palmer, Jacqueline de Rose-Ahern, Melinda Smith

=== 2024 AWARDS ===
Fiction Self-published

- Highly Commended: The Last Famine by Elisa Cristallo

Fiction Traditional Publishing

- Winner: Girl in a Pink Dress by Kylie Needham (Penguin Books Australia)
- Highly Commended: Untethered by Ayesha Inoon (HarperCollins Australia)

Nonfiction Self-published

- Winner: Neither King nor Saint by Helen Topor

Nonfiction Traditional Publishing

- Winner: Bennelong & Phillip: A History Unravelled by Kate Fullagar (Scribner Australia)
- Highly Commended: Helena Rubinstein: The Australian Years by Angus Trumble (La Trobe University Press, Black Inc.)

Children's Self-published

- Winner: That Book About Space Stuff by David Conley
- Highly Commended: Phoenix and Ralph by Barbie Robinson, ill. Ian Robertson

Children's Traditional Publishing

- Winner - YOUNGER READERS: The Turtle and the Flood by Jackie French, ill. Danny Snell (HarperCollins Australia)
- Winner - NONFICTION: Wildlife Compendium of the World by Tania McCartney (Hardie Grant)
- Winner - OLDER READERS: We Didn't Think It Through by Gary Lonesborough (Allen & Unwin)
- Highly Commended: Neil the Amazing Sea Cucumber by Amelia McInerney, ill. Lucinda Gifford (Affirm Press)
- Highly Commended: Phonobet by Kathy Weeden, ill. Kim Drane (NLA Publishing)
- Highly Commended: Surprise at the End of Onkaparinga Lane by Rhian Williams, ill. Martina Heiduczek (Walker Books Australia)

Poetry Traditional Publishing

- Winner: The Moon the Bone: Selected Poems 1986-2022 by Tim Metcalf (Ginninderra Press)
- Highly Commended: Meaty Bones by K A Nelson (Recent Work Press)
- Highly Commended: Apostles of Anarchy by Sandra Renew (Recent Work Press)

The June Shenfield Poetry Award

- First Place: Cate Furey, Momentum (ACT)
- Second Place: Lucinda Ferguson, Wasabi Peas (NSW)
- Third Place: Hayden William, Now Who Let These Thoughts In? (NSW)

The Anne Edgeworth Fellowship for Emerging Writers

- Joint Award Winners: Jemima Parker and Gill Watson

The Marion Halligan Award Sleeplessness by Paul Hetherington (Pierian Springs Press)

Marion Fellowship Award 24/25 awarded to Callie Doyle-Scott (ACT)

JUDGES 2024 - Fiction: Beejay Silcox. Nonfiction: Frank Bongiorno. Poetry: Dr Paul Collis. Children's Book: Krys Saclier. The June Shenfield Poetry Award: Dan Hogan.

=== 2023 AWARDS ===
Fiction Small Press

- Winner: Then Eve by Tanya Davies

Fiction Big Press

- Winner: The Tilt by Chris Hammer (Allen & Unwin)

Nonfiction Small Press

- Winner: Neither King nor Saint by Helen Topor

Nonfiction Big Press

- Winner: The Glass Cricket Ball by Jan Williams Smith (Big Sky)
- Highly Commended: Legitimate Sexpectations by Katrina Marson (Scribe Publications)

Children's Small Press

- Winner: Charles the Gallery Dog by Barbie Robinson, ill. Ian Robertson (For Pity Sake Publishing)

Children's Big Press

- Winner: Diary of a Rescued Wombat: The untold story by Jackie French, ill. Bruce Whatley (HarperCollins)
- Highly Commended: Swifty the Super-Fast Parrot by Stephanie Owen Reeder, ill. Astred Hicks (CSIRO Publishing)
- Highly Commended: Seree's Story by Irma Gold, ill. Wayne Harris (Walker Books Australia)

Poetry Small Press

- Winner: Translating Loss: A haiku collection by Maurice Nevile

Poetry Big Press

- Winner: Beloved by Penelope Layland (Recent Work Press)
- Highly Commended: Waterlines by Peter Ramm (Vagabond Press)

The MARION Overall Special Book Award 2023

- Winner: Whitefella Yella Tree by Dylan Van Den Berg (Currency Press)

The June Shenfield Poetry Award

- First Place: Rhian Healy (WA)
- Second Place: Alana Kelsall (VIC)
- Third Place: Rebecca Fleming (ACT)

Marion Fellowship Award 23/24 awarded to Maya Hodge (VIC)

JUDGES 2023 - Fiction: Lucy Neave. Nonfiction: Jessica Friedmann. Poetry: Subhash Jaireth. Children's Book: Anna Branford. The June Shenfield Poetry Award: Paul Hetherington.

=== 2022 AWARDS ===
Fiction Small Press

- Winner: Everything I Am by Jenny Bond (The Hard Word)
- Highly Commended: Dear Ibis by Kate Liston-Mills (Spineless Wonders)

Fiction Big Press

- Winner: Milk by Dylan van den Berg (Currency Press/The Street Theatre)

Nonfiction Small Press

- Winner: Coolamon Girl by Dianne Lucas (Ginninderra Press)

Nonfiction Big Press

- Winner: Summertime by Danielle Celermajer (Penguin Books Australia)

Children's Small Press

- Winner: Where the Heart Is by Irma Gold, ill. Susannah Crispe (Exisle Publishing)
- Highly Commended: All Dogs Bark by Catherine Meatheringham and Deb Hudson (Windy Hollow Books)

Children's Big Press

- Winner: The Last Dragon by Charles Massy, ill. Mandy Foot (NLA Publishing)
- Highly Commended: Wiradjuri Country by Larry Brandy (NLA Publishing)

Poetry Small Press

- Winner: It's the Sugar, Sugar by Sandra Renew (Recent Work Press)
- Highly Commended: Text/ure by Sarah Rice (Recent Work Press)
- Highly Commended: Chalk Borders by Sarah St Vincent Welch (Flying Island Books)

Poetry Big Press

- Winner: The Wear of My Face by Lizz Murphy (Spinifex Press)

The ACT Writers Overall Special Book Award 2022

- Winner: Killernova by Omar Musa (Penguin Books Australia)
- Winner: The Wear of My Face by Lizz Murphy (Spinifex Press)

The June Shenfield Poetry Award

- First Place: If I Put It In A Poem by Rosa O’Kane (ACT)
- Second Place: In the Oxford book of ballads by Andrew Spiker (VIC)
- Third Place: Armillaris by Claire Miranda Roberts (VIC)

The Anne Edgeworth Fellowship for Emerging Writers

- Joint Awards Winners: Julia Faragher and Samantha Tidy

JUDGES 2022 - Fiction: Robyn Cadwallader, Shelley Burr. Nonfiction: Nicole Moore, Ginger Gorman. Poetry: Lucy Alexander, Samia Goudie. Children's: Tracey Hawkins, David Conley. The Marjorie Graber-McInnis Short Story Award, Beatrice Smith.

=== 2021 AWARDS ===
Fiction Small Press

- Winner: Neon Leviathan by TR Napper (Grimdark Magazine)
- Highly Commended: The Philosopher's Daughters by Alison Booth (RedDoor Press, UK)

Fiction Big Press

- Winner: Desire Lines by Felicity Volk (Hachette Australia)

NonFiction Small Press

- Winner: Pandemic: The Spanish Flu in Australia 1918-1920 by Ian W. Shaw (Woodslane Press)
- Highly Commended: The Philosopher's Daughters by Alison Booth (RedDoor Press, UK)

NonFiction Big Press

- Winner: Radio Girl: The Story of the Extraordinary Mrs Mac, Pioneering Engineer and Wartime Legend by David Dufty (Allen & Unwin)

Children's Small Press

- Winner: Vote for Me by Krys Saclier, ill. Cathy Wilcox (Wild Dog)
- Highly Commended: Feathers by Karen Hendriks, ill. Kim Fleming (Empowering Resources)

Children's Big Press

- Winner: Hold On! Saving the Spotted Handfish by Gina Newton, ill. Rachel Tribout (CSIRO)
- Highly Commended: Australia's Wild Weird Wonderful Weather by Stephanie Owen Reeder, ill. Tania McCartney (NLA Publishing)

Poetry Small Press

- Winner: Nigh by Penelope Layland (Recent Work Press)
- Highly Commended: Utterly by PS Cottier (Ginninderra Press)

Poetry Big Press

- not awarded

The ACT Writers Overall Book Award 2021

- Winner: On a Barbarous Coast by Craig Cormick, Harold Ludwick (Allen & Unwin)

JUDGES 2021 - Fiction: Robyn Cadwallader, Shelley Burr. Nonfiction: Nicole Moore, Ginger Gorman. Poetry: Lucy Alexander, Samia Goudie. Children's Book: Tracey Hawkins, David Conley. The Marjorie Graber-McInnis Short Story Award: Beatrice Smith.

=== 2020 AWARDS ===
Fiction

- Winner: The Light Bearer by Andrew Einspruch
- Highly Commended: A Tale of Stars and Shadow by Lisa Cassidy
- Highly Commended: How Not To Acquire A Castle by Amy Laurens
- Highly Commended: Into Bones like Oil by Kaaron Warren

Nonfiction

- Winner: Bandit Saints of Java by George Quinn
- Highly Commended: Out of Order by Rob Donnelly
- Highly Commended: Families in the Digital Age by Toni Hassan

Children's

- Winner: Fauna: Australia's Most Curious Creatures by Tania McCartney
- Highly Commended: Leaping Lola by Tracey Hawkins and Anil Tortop

Poetry

- Winner: Acting Like a Girl by Sandra Renew
- Highly Commended: blur by the by Cham Zhi Yi
- Highly Commended: Catching the Light by Suzanne Edgar

The Marjorie Graber-McInnis Short Story Award

- Winner: "Bygone" by Sophie Clews
- Highly Commended: The Navigators by Mick Donaldson
- Highly Commended: Vertical by Ian Hart
- Highly Commended: The Suitcase by Deborah Huff-Horwood

The June Shenfield Poetry Award

- First Place: Part of its trunk by Elanna Herbert
- Second Place: Paper Daisies by Carmel Summers
- Third Place: The Cleaning Woman by Carla de Goede

The Anne Edgeworth Fellowship for Young Writers

- Winner: Natalie Cooke
- Winner: Emilie Morscheck

JUDGES 2020 - Fiction: Andrew Hutchinson, Leife Shallcross. Nonfiction: Helen Ennis, Patrick Mullins. Poetry: Andrew Galan, Eleanor Malbon. Children's Book: Leanne Barrett, Jacqueline de Rose-Ahern. The Marjorie Graber-McInnis Short Story Award: Beatrice Smith. The June Shenfield Poetry Award: Judith Nangala Crispin, Scott-Patrick Mitchell.

=== 2019 AWARDS ===
Fiction

- Winner: Triumviratus by Shane Smith
- Highly Commended: A Perfect Marriage by Alison Booth
- Highly Commended: After She Left by Penelope Hanley
- Highly Commended: Years of the Wolf by Craig Cormick

Nonfiction

- Winner: Backseat Drivers by Craig Cormick
- Highly Commended: Joe Baker by Angelika Erpic
- Highly Commended: Fire at Sea: HMAS Westralia 1998 by Kathryn Spurling

Children's

- Winner: Billie by Nicole Godwin, ill. Demelsa Haughton
- Winner: When Worlds Collide by Amy Laurens

Poetry

- Winner: Things I’ve Thought to Tell You Since I Saw You Last by Penelope Layland
- Highly Commended: Inlandia by KA Nelson

The Marjorie Graber-McInnis Short Story Award

- Winner: Pig Headed by Ron Schroer
- Highly Commended: Nobody's Home by Sophie Campbell
- Highly Commended: The Shearer's Wife by Elizabeth Egan

The June Shenfield Poetry Award

- Winner: Satan's Brew by Riahta Ranford
- Highly Commended: Last Lights On the Great Divide by Simone King
- Highly Commended: Keeping My Wits About Me by Rosalind Moran

The Anne Edgeworth Fellowship for Emerging Writers

- Awarded to Kellie Nissen
- Shortlisted: Simone King, Rebekka Leary, Gemma Nethercote Way

JUDGES 2019 - Fiction: Kaaron Warren, Margaret Innes. Nonfiction: Amy Walters, Peter Papathansiou. Poetry: Hazel Hall, Merlinda Bobis. Children's Book: Tania McCartney, Jacqueline de Rose-Ahern. The Marjorie Graber-McInnis Short Story Award: Beatrice Smith. The June Shenfield Poetry Award: Lucy Alexander.

=== 2018 AWARDS ===
Fiction

- Winner: Paper Cuts: Comedic and satirical monologues for audition or performance by Kirsty Budding

Nonfiction

- Winner: Verity by Robert Lehane

Children's

- Winner: Trouble in Tune Town by Maura Pierlot

Poetry

- Winner: A Constellation of Abnormalities by Paul Cliff

The Marjorie Graber-McInnis Short Story Award

- Winner: Loyal Animals by Amanda McLeod

The June Shenfield Poetry Award

- Winner: Incursion, Extinctions by Natalie Cooke

The Anne Edgeworth Fellowship for Young Writers

- Winner: Gemma Killen

=== 2017 AWARDS ===
Fiction

- Winner: The Grief Hole by Kaaron Warren
- Highly Commended: All the King's Men by Shane W. Smith
- Highly Commended: Fabel by Tom Heffernan

Children's

- Winner: Amazing Animals of Australia's National Parks by Gina Newton
- Highly Commended: Australia Illustrated by Tania McCartney

June Shenfield Poetry Award

- Winner: third daughter by Penny O'Hara
- Winner: Recycling by Ella Jeffery
- Highly Commended: The Uses of a Shark by Damen O'Brien

Marjorie Graber-McInnis Short Story Award

- Winner: 273 by Cherisse Kelly
- Highly Commended: The Secret Moons by Frances Seymour
- Highly Commended: Intersection by James Salvage

Anne Edgeworth Fellowship

- Winner: Jemimah Cooper
- Winner: Jacqueline de Rose-Ahern
- Highly Commended: Ellen Harvey
- Highly Commended: Kathryn Hind

=== 2016 AWARDS ===
Fiction

- Winner: Cranky Ladies of History edited by Tansy Rayner Roberts, Tehani Wessely
- Highly Commended: Olmec Obituary (Dr Pimms, Intermillennial Sleuth series) by L.J.M. Owen
- Highly Commended: Undad by Shane W. Smith

Nonfiction

- Winner: Building a City: CS Daley and the Story of Canberra by Jennifer Horsfield
- Highly Commended: Paths into Inner Canberra by P.S. Cottier
- Highly Commended: Australian Predators of the Sky by Penny Olsen
- Highly Commended: Weekend Warriors: A Funny Side by James Sanderson

Children's

- Winner: Horace the Baker's Horse by Jackie French, ill. Peter Bray
- Highly Commended: Lennie the Legend: Solo to Sydney by Pony by Stephanie Owen Reeder
- Highly Commended: This is Captain Cook by Tania McCartney, illustrated by Christina Booth

Poetry

- Winner: Deep in the Valley of Tea Bowls by Kathy Kituai
- Highly Commended: Ripples Under the Skin by Janette Pieloor

The Marjorie Graber-McInnis Short Story Award

- Winner: Sandman by Ron Schroer
- Second Place: Roadwork Ahead by Greg Burgess
- Highly Commended: Fight or Flight by Isabelo Gacusan
- Highly Commended: The Abject Redemption of Athalie Roche by Erin Prothero

The June Shenfield Poetry Award

- Winner: Ghost by Hessom Razavi
- Second Place: Tumbleweed by Daniel Hutley
- Second Place: White Lilac (For Deb) by Saaro Umar
- Highly Commended: brontebright by Samuel Guthrie
- Highly Commended: My Grandmother's Language by Nadia Niaz
- Highly Commended: The Lumber Room by Stephen Smithyman

The Anne Edgeworth Fellowship for Young Writers

- Winner: Rosanna Stevens
- Shortlisted: Shu-Ling Chua
- Shortlisted: Grace Finlayson
- Shortlisted: Leearni Hamilton

JUDGES 2016 - Fiction: Karen Viggers, Craig Cormick. Nonfiction: Biff Ward, Kristen Alexander. Poetry: Geoff Page, Andrew Galan. Children's: Tracey Hawkins, K.J. Taylor. The Marjorie Graber-McInnis Short Story Award: Kaaron Warren. The June Shenfield Poetry Award: Jenni Kemarre Martiniello, Ann Shenfield, Holly Zhangthe

=== 2015 AWARDS ===
Marjorie Graber-McInnis Short Story Award

- Winner: Torvald's Year by C.H. Pearce
- Highly Commended: Frozen Stiff by Elizabeth Egan
- Highly Commended: Now and Then by Jennifer Hand

Michael Thwaites Poetry Award

- Winner: Ode to a Papermate Inkjoy 100 by Penny O'Hara
- Highly Commended: Winter evening on the Monaro by Laurence Anderson
- Highly Commended: Action (Bus Route 2) by Sarah Rice
- Highly Commended: Memorabilia by Michelle Brock

Z4 Review Writing Award

- Winner: Excavate by Shu-Ling Chua

Publishing Awards: Fiction Category

- Winner: Uncle Adolf by Craig Cormick
- Highly Commended: Capital Yarns by Sean Costello

Publishing Awards: Nonfiction Category

- Winner: Australia's Few and the Battle of Britain by Kristen Alexander
- Highly Commended: The Pearl King by Robert Lehane

Publishing Awards: Children's Fiction Category

- Winner: Midnight Burial by Pauline Deeves
- Highly Commended: Tottie and Dot by Tania McCartney

Publishing Awards: Poetry Category

- Winner: Fire in the Afternoon by John Stokes
- Highly Commended: The Stars Like Sand: Australian Speculative Poetry by P. S. Cottier and Tim Jones

Anne Edgeworth Fellowship for Young Writers

- Winner: Louis Klee

=== 2014 AWARDS ===
Marjorie Graber-McInnis Short Story Award

- Winner: A White Woman in Ōjin by Ashley Thomson
- Highly Commended:
  - Hooking In by Christine Kearney
  - The Loose Thread and the Sterile Needles by Cara Lennon
  - The Garden House by Alison O’Hara

Michael Thwaites Poetry Award

- Winner: Stilettos by Robyn Lance
- Highly Commended: Calling me in by Susan McGrath, Jack and Jill by Gregory A Gould, Implausible Birds by Kavya Robinson

Nonfiction Book Category

- Winner: 18 Days – Al Jazeera English and the Egyptian Revolution (Editia) by Scott Bridges
- Highly Commended:
  - Meat Pies and Mumbling Blokes – A Canberra Memoir (Ginninderra Press) by Margitta Acker
  - Australian Eagles: Australians in the Battle of Britain (Barrallier Books) by Kristen Alexander

Fiction Book Category

- Winner: The Happiness Jar (Storytorch Press) by Samantha Tidy
- Highly Commended: Round and Round by Jordan Morris

Poetry Book Category

- Winner: The Petrov Poems ( Pitt Street Poetry) by Lesley Lebkowicz
- Highly Commended:
  - Improving the News (Pitt Street Poetry) by Geoff Page
  - Drag down to unlock or place an emergency call (Pitt Street Poetry) by Melinda Smith
  - Extravagance (Ginninderra Press) by Irene Wilkie

Children's Book Category

- Winner: An Aussie Year (Exisle Publishing) by Tania McCartney
- Highly Commended:
  - The Very Sad Fish-lady by Joy McDonald
  - A Lion, a Whale and a Flea by Maree Teychenne

Anne Edgeworth Fellowship for Young ACT Writers

- Winners: Zoya Patel and Lisa Fuller

=== 2013 AWARDS ===
Marjorie Graber-McInnis Short Story Award

- Winner: This Square Called a Ring by Monica Carroll
- Highly Commended:
  - Breath by Michelle Brock
  - Feather-light by Claire Delahunty

Michael Thwaites Poetry Award

- Winner: Ode to a Toothbrush by Penny O'Hara
- Highly Commended:
  - After Nights by Claire Delahunty
  - An Untimely Death by Rebecca Fleming

Nonfiction Book Category

- Winner: Canberry Tales: An Informal History (Arcadia) by G.A. Mawer
- Highly Commended: Leaving the Rest Behind: An Immigrant's Story by Ann Nugent

Fiction Book Category

- Winner: Through Splintered Walls (Twelfth Planet Press) by Kaaron Warren
- Highly Commended:
  - I'm Ready Now (Blemish Books) by Nigel Featherstone
  - Provocation (Arcadia) by Donald McMaster

Poetry Book Category

- Winner: First...Then... (Ginninderra Press) by Melinda Smith
- Highly Commended:
  - The Love Procession (Ginninderra Press) by Suzanne Edgar
  - In Country (Bat Trang Road Press) by Leon Trainor

Children's Book Category

- Co-winner: Sarah's Song (A Tiny Publication) by Tanya Davies
- Co-winner: My Aunt Ate a Plate (Starry Night Publishing) by Maree Teychenne

Z4 Award for book reviews

- Winner: Duncan Driver's review of Martin Amis's novel Lionel Asbo: State of England

Anne Edgeworth Fellowship for Young ACT Writers

- Brian Obiri-Asare to produce his play In Between the Solitude of Sunburnt Islands

=== 2012 AWARDS ===
Marjorie Graber-McInnis Short Story Award

- Winner: Paper Cranes by Rachael Rippon
- Highly Commended: Fiona Hamer

Michael Thwaites Poetry Award

- Winner: Isi Unikowski
- Highly Commended: Monica Carroll

Children's Book category

- Winner: Tracey Hawkins

Nonfiction Book category

- Winner: Irma Gold
- Highly Commended: Ann Villiers
- Highly Commended: Alan Foskett

Fiction Book Category

- Winner: Nigel Featherstone
- Highly Commended: Irma Gold
- Highly Commended: Elizabeth Egan

Poetry Book Category

- Winner: Michael Byrne

Z4 Award for book reviews

- Winner: Colin Steele

=== 2011 AWARDS ===
- Nonfiction – Who Lied? The Ly-ee-moon Disaster and a Question of Truth by Graeme Barrow
- Fiction – Dead Sea Fruit by Kaaron Warren
- Poetry – A Man of Emails by Michael Byrne
- Children's – (not awarded)
- Short story – The Day for Travelling by Robyn Cadwallader

=== 2010 AWARDS ===
- Nonfiction – Capital Sailing: The history of the Canberra Yacht Club 1959–2009 by Alan Foskett
- Fiction – Hornet Bank by Gordon Reid
- Poetry – Before Afterwards by Leon Trainor
- Children's – (not awarded)
- Short story – "Acts of Kindness" by Jennifer Shapcott

=== 2009 AWARDS ===
- Nonfiction – The Campbell Community by Alan Foskett
- Fiction – Smoke and Mirrors by Kel Robertson
- Poetry – Sleeping Alone by Michael Thorley
- Children's – Butterscotch: Family and Friends by William Nevin Morison & Rebecca Dempsey
- Marjorie Graber-McInnis Short Story Award – Basant by Maryanne Khan

=== 2008 AWARDS ===
- Nonfiction – Rainbow by Jennifer Horsfield
- Fiction – Not a Flotation Device by Peter Frankis
- Poetry – Migrant writer on a bus, thinking of Kundera by Danijela Kambaskovic-Sawers (unpublished poem by an ACT writer) Andy Jackson (unpublished poem by an Australian writer)
- Children's – (not awarded)

=== 2007 AWARDS ===
- Nonfiction – Men at Birth by David Vernon
- Fiction – Ghosts in the Helmet Trees by Rory Steele
- Poetry – Verbal Medicine by Tim Metcalf
- Children's – Secrets by Stephen Matthews

=== 2006 AWARDS ===
- Nonfiction – Unlocking History's Secrets by Graeme Barrow and Australian Speculative Fiction: A Genre Overview by Donna Maree Hanson
- Fiction – The Grinding House by Kaaron Warren
- Poetry – Southbound by Michael Byrne
- Children's – Not Awarded

=== 2005 AWARDS ===
- Nonfiction – Days of Innocents edited by Hilary Trotter
- Fiction – Trouble in the Garden by Peter Frankis
- Poetry – Unfinished Journey by Michael Thwaites
- Children's – The Year of the Mean Queen by Graeme Hume and Caroline Ambrus

=== 2004 AWARDS ===
- Nonfiction – Huts in the Victorian Alps by Klaus Hueneke
- Fiction – You by Narelle Wickham
- Poetry – Indigo Book of Modern Australian Sonnets by Geoff Page
