= Craig Cormick =

Australian science writer

Craig Cormick OAM
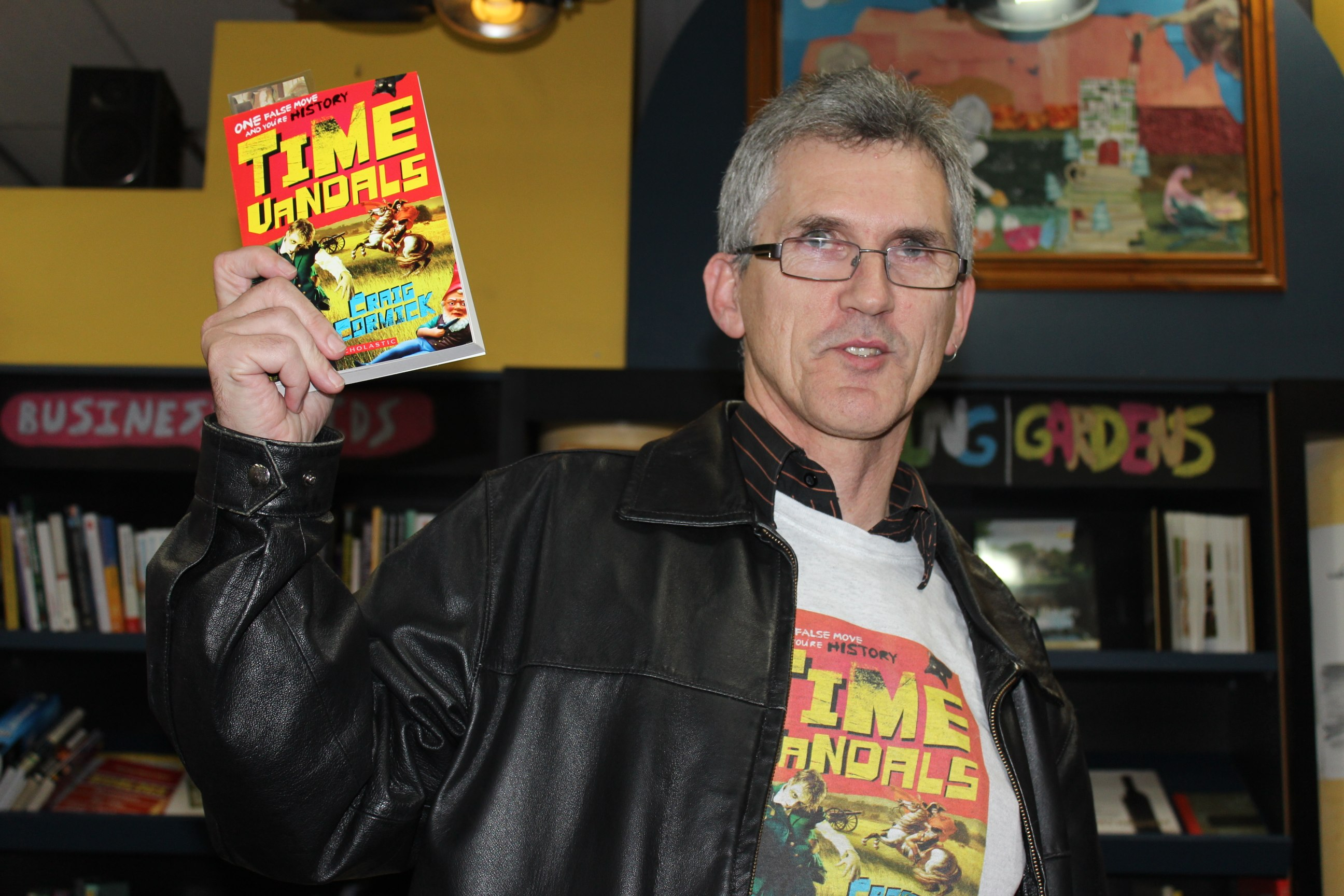
- Cormick with his book, Time Vandals, in 2012
- Born: 1961 (age 64–65); Wollongong, New South Wales, Australia
- Occupations: Science communicator and author
- Writing career
- Notable awards: ACT Literary Awards – Overall Book Award 2021, winner

Craig Cormick is an Australian science communicator and author. He was born in Wollongong in 1961, and is known for his creative writing and social research into public attitudes towards new technologies. He has lived mainly in Canberra, but has also lived in Iceland (1980–81) and Finland (1984–85). He has published over 40 books of fiction and non-fiction. He has been active in the Canberra writing community, teaching and editing, was Chair of the ACT Writers Centre from 2003 to 2008 and in 2006 was Writer in Residence at the Universiti Sains Malaysia in Penang, Malaysia.

In 2025 his co-written book Warra Warra Wai won the NSW Premiers History Awards, was shortlisted for the Prime Minister's Literary Awards, and was shortlisted in two categories for the Queensland Literary Awards.

Cormick's creative writing has appeared in Southerly, Westerly, Island Magazine, Meanjin, The Phoenix Review, Overland, Scarp, 4W, Redoubt, Block, as well as in overseas publications including Silverfish New Writing (Malaysia) and Foreign Literature No 6 (China). He has previously been an editor of the radical arts magazine Blast, and his writing awards include the ACT Book of the Year Award in 1999 a Queensland Premier's Literary Award in 2006, a Victorian Community History Award in 2015, the ACT Writing and Publishing Award in 2015 and the Tasmanian Writers' Prize in 2016.

As a science communicator he has worked for the CSIRO, Questacon and the Department of Industry, Science, Energy and Resources, and has represented the Australian Government at many international science forums including APEC and OECD conferences, presenting on issues relating to public concerns about new technologies. In 2013 he was awarded the Unsung Hero of Science Communications by the Australian Science Communicators. Since 2019 he has been serving on the Advisory Board on Education and Outreach to the Nobel Prize Winning Organisation for the Prohibition of Chemical Weapons.

Cormick was awarded the Medal of the Order of Australia (OAM) in the 2021 Queen's Birthday Honours "service to science, and to the community".

== Literary career ==
Craig Cormick studied journalism and creative writing at the University of Canberra, with stints at the Canberra School of Art, the University of Iceland and Helsinki University. He returned to the University of Canberra to study languages, public relations and sociology, undertake a Masters in Communications and then completed a PhD in Creative Communications at Deakin University in 2007.

His first books were self-published or picked up by small presses until Unwritten Histories was published by Aboriginal Studies Press in 1998. The book subsequently won the ACT Book of the Year Award. His work has a strong sense of satire, across themes that include exploration, isolation, duality and Ned Kelly (who appears at least once in each of his eight short story collections). He has written and published, on average, one book a year since 1998, including collections of short fiction, novels and non-fiction.

He has published scholarly articles on public attitudes to new technologies in publications including: NanoEthics, the International Journal of Biotechnology Agricultural Science, Historia Ciencias Saude (Brazil) and Choices (USA). He also authored the Australian Government reports, Cloning Goes to the Movies, and What you really need to know about what the public really thinks about GM foods.

In 2008 he fulfilled "a life's dream" and travelled to Antarctica as an Antarctic Arts Fellow, visiting the three Australian stations on the continent, Casey, Davis and Mawson, publishing his experiences as In Bed with Douglas Mawson: Travels around Antarctica, in 2011, which merges his two interests of science and creative writing. He has also published one of the few research papers ever on nudity in Antarctica.

In 2014 and 2015 he published the acclaimed the Shadow Master series with Angry Robot books, in the US and UK, as was a guest author at the Convergence fan convention in Minneapolis, and at WorldCon in Helsinki in 2018. In 2015 he also took part in the Yale Writers Conference.

Post-Covid he has embarked on several research journeys into First Nations histories and in 2024 published, along with First Nations author Darren Rix, Warra Warra Wai: How Indigenous Australians discovered Captain Cook, and what they tell of the coming of the Ghost People.

== Writing awards ==
- 2019 – Winner of the ACT Writing and Publishing Awards - non-fiction, for Backseat Drivers, 2018
- 2019 – Shortlisted for an Aurealis Award for Best Horror Book for Years of the Wolf, 2018
- 2020 – Winner of the Roly Sussex Short Story Prize for the "Lost Journal of Edmund Kennedy"
- 2022 – Winner of the Special Book Award from 2020 as a part of the ACT Notable Awards 2022 for On A Barbarous Coast
- 2023 – Commendation in the Victorian Community History Awards – A Darker Shade of Moonlite
- 2024 – Winner Canberra Critics Circle Warra Warra Wai
- 2025 – Winner Lane Cove Short Story Competition for "The Names of Those Lost"
- 2025 – Winner NSW Premier's History Award Warra Warra Wai
- 2025 – Winner ACT Book of the Year Award Warra Warra Wai
- 2025 – Prime Minister's Literary Awards shortlisted Warra Warra Wai

== Works ==
=== Books published ===
- Warra Warra Wai: How Indigenous Australians discovered Captain Cook, and what they tell about the coming of the Ghost People, Simon & Schuster, ISBN 9781761424021.
- Superheroes for a Day, Exisle Publishing, ISBN 9781922539977.
- Demoniacs, IFWG Publishing International, ISBN 1922856460.
- A darker Shade of Moonlight, Queer Oz Folk, ISBN 9780645253481.
- Horrible and Heroic History of Antarctic Exploration, Merino Press, ISBN 978-0-646-85393-2.
- Archangel, Merino Press, ASIN B0BGS26T9D.
- The Twilight of the Time Vandals, Merino Press, ASIN B0763LFM5D.
- What If History of Australia: Gold Rush: Going Gold Crazy, Big Sky Publishing, ISBN 9781922615824.
- What If History of Australia: Colonial Settlement: France vs Britain, Big Sky Publishing, ISBN 9781922615763.
- The Cruise to the End of the World, Merino Press, ASIN B09GRCLLG5.
- On A Barbarous Coast(with Harold Ludwick), Allen and Unwin, 2020. ISBN 9781760877347.
- The Science of Communicating Science, CSIRO Publishing, 2019. ISBN 9781486309818.
- Years of the Wolf, IFWG Australia, 2018. ISBN 978-0-9945229-3-1. (Shortlisted for an Aurealis Award for Best Horror Book).
- Backseat Drivers, Ginninderra Press, 2018. ISBN 978 1 76041 505 1. (Shortlisted for a Victorian Community History Award).
- The Seven Voyages of Captain Cook, Dimension 6, coeur de lion, 2017. ASIN B07771J5XX. (Shortlisted for a 2017 Aurealis Award - Best Anthology).
- Valdur the Viking and the Ghostly Goths, Ford Street Publishing, 2016. ISBN 9781925272420.
- The Floating City, Angry Robot Books, 2015. ISBN 9780857664242.
- Ned Kelly Under the Microscope, CSIRO Publishing, 2014. (Winner of a Victorian Community History Award, 2015) ISBN 9781486301775.
- The Shadow Master, Angry Robot Books, 2014. ISBN 9780857665157.
- Uncle Adolf, Ginninderra Press, 2014. (Winner of an ACT Publishing Award, 2015). ISBN 9781740278645.
- Benji the Buccaneer (Children's book), New Frontier, 2014. ISBN 9781925059052.
- Time Vandals, Scholastic Australia, 2012. ISBN 978-186291-947-1.
- Shipwrecks of the Southern Seas, Murdoch Books, 2011. ISBN 978-1-74196-787-6.
- In Bed with Douglas Mawson, New Holland Press, 2011. ISBN 978-1-74257-008-2.
- Futures Trading, Mockingbird Press, 2009.[*Shortlisted for the ACT Writing and Publishing Awards 2010]. ISBN 978-1-74027-560-6.
- The Last Super: The creation and recreation of Alexander Pearce, the 'cannibal convict' of Van Diemen's Land, Lambert Academic Publishing, 2009. ISBN 978-3-8383-3020-4.
- Of One Blood, Australian Booksellers Association, 2007. [*As a manuscript, shortlisted for the Australian-Vogel Award in 1993, the National Book Council Award in 1996 and the Victorian Fellowship of Australian Writers Jim Hamilton Award in 1999]. ISBN 0-9752485-7-X.
- The Prince of Frogs, Mockingbird Press, 2007. ISBN 9781740274357/
- A Funny Thing Happened at 27,000 feet..., Mockingbird Press, 2005.[*Winner of the Queensland Premier's Award – Steel Rudd Award for short fiction, 2006]. ISBN 1-74027-337-0.
- The Princess of Cups, Mockingbird Press, 2003.[*Short-listed for the Queensland Premier's Award Steel Rudd Award, 2004]. ISBN 1-74027-224-2.
- DIG: the Unwritten History of Burke and Wills, Ginninderra Press, 2002. ISBN 1-74027-138-6.
- The Queen of Aegea, Mockingbird Press, 2001. ISBN 1-74027-086-X.
- When Angels Call, [Short fiction by Craig Cormick, Poetry by Hal Judge and illustrations by Steve Harrison), Aberrant Genotype Press, 2001. ISBN 1-876771-02-X.
- Kurikka's Dreaming, Simon and Schuster, 2000. [*featured on ABC Radio National's Australia Talks Books, May 2001]. ISBN 0-7318-1024-4.
- The King of Patagonia, Mockingbird Press, 1999. ISBN 1-74027-019-3.
- Unwritten Histories Aboriginal Studies Press, 1998. [*Winner of the 1999 ACT Chief Minister's Book of the Year Award]. ISBN 0-85575-316-1.
- Pimplemania, MacMillan Educational, 1997. ISBN 0-7329-4613-1.

=== Books edited ===
- Snapshots, Oak Publications, Malaysia, 2006. ISBN 978-983-3735-03-7.
- Co-editor of Meeting of Muses, Mockingbird Press, 2003. ISBN 1-74027-177-7.
- Co-editor of The Circulatory System, Mockingbird Press, 2001. ISBN 1-74027-112-2.
- Co-editor of Time Pieces, Mockingbird Press, 1999. [*Commended in the Victorian FAW Community Writer's Award, 1999]. ISBN 1-876259-83-3.
- Protesting the Testing: Canberra Writers Speak Out Against Nuclear Testing in the Pacific, 1995, (Left Book Club (ACT) and PEN (ACT)). ISBN 1-875285-18-0.

=== Academic publications ===
- Cormick. C. the Culture and Subcultures of Nakedness in Antarctica June 2021, Social Sciences 10(3):119-124
- Cormick. C., Nielssen. O., Ashworth. P., La Salle. J., & Saab. C., What Do Science Communicators Talk About When They Talk About Science Communications? Engaging With the Engagers, Science Communication 37(2):274-282.
- Cormick. C., and Romanach, L., Segmentation studies provide insights to better understanding attitudes towards science and technology, Trends in Biotechnology, Volume 32, Issue 3, March 2014, Pages 114–116.
- Cormick.C., and Hunter. S., Valuing Values: Better Public Engagement on Nanotechnology Demands a Better Understanding of the Diversity of the Publics, NanoEthics, April 2014, Volume 8, Issue 1, pp 57–71.
- Ten Big Questions on Public Engagement on Science and Technology: Observation from a Rocky Boat in the Upstream and Downstream of Engagement, in DEMESCI – the International Journal of Deliberative Mechanisms in Science,, Volume 1, number 1, August 2012.
- The Complexity of Public Engagement, in Nature Nanotechnology,, February 2012.
- Why Do We Need to Know What the Public Thinks about Nanotechnology? NanoEthics, August 2009.
- Piecing Together the Elephant: Public Engagement on Nanotechnology Challenges’, Science and Engineering Ethics, Volume 15 Number 3, 2009.
- What do the Public Really Think and Who do they Really Trust, in Human Biotechnology and Public Trust, Centre for Law and Genetics, University of Tasmania, 2008.
- Public Attitudes Towards GM Crops and Foods, Agricultural Science, Volume 21, No 2 – September 2007.
- A clonagem vai ao cinema, Historia Ciencias Saude, Manghinhos, Brazil, Volume 13, October 2006.
- Lies Deep Fries and Statistics,Choices, USA. 2005.
- Perceptions of Risk Relating to Biotechnology in Australia, International Journal of Biotechnology. Vol 5, No 2, 2003.
- Recent Changes in Public Attitudes Towards Biotechnology in Australia, Australian Biologist, Vol.15 (2), September 2002.
- Australian Attitudes to GM Foods and Crops, Pesticide Outlook, Royal Society of Chemistry, December 2002.
