= Christina Booth (author) =

Australian author and illustrator

- Occupation: Ambassador for the Books in Homes Program
- Known for: Australian author and illustrator of over 30 books, primarily for children
- Awards: Environment Award for Children's Literature 2014, Royal Zoological Society of NSW Whitley Award
- Honours: 2010 – Honour Book – Children’s Book Council of Australia (CBCA) Book of the Year: Early Childhood – Kip

Christina Booth is an Australian author and illustrator of over 30 books, primarily for children. Raised in Tasmania, she began as an illustrator for prominent Australian writers before publishing her own books, including the award-winning Kip, Welcome Home, and One Careless Night. Her illustrations for the 2024 title Wedge-Tailed Eagle, won a 2025 Notable Book in the Children's Book of the Year Award: Eve Pownall Award for Information Books. Booth's books cover diverse topics from environmental themes to historical narratives, and she has received multiple fellowships supporting her contribution to children’s literature.

== Biography ==
Booth was raised in Tasmania. She began her career illustrating books by Australian authors such as Max Fatchen, Colin Thiele, Christobel Mattingley, and Jackie French, and wrote her first book Purinina: A Devil's Tale in 2007.

Her notable works include Kip, a story about a rooster in the city, which received a 2010 Children's Book Council of Australia (CBCA) Honour Book award; Welcome Home, addressing the return of a whale to safe shores, awarded the 2014 Environment Award for Children's Literature; and One Careless Night, depicting the story of the last thylacine in captivity, which was shortlisted for the 2020 Prime Minister's Literary Awards, the 2020 Environment Aware for Children's Literature, and received the Royal Zoological Society of NSW Whitley Award in the children's educational section.

Booth has received several fellowships in recognition of her work. She was awarded a May Gibbs Children's Literature Trust Creative Time Fellowship, which provided dedicated time and space to develop new work. She has also been the recipient of fellowships from Varuna, the National Writers’ House, and the Tasmanian Writers Centre, supporting her ongoing contributions to Australian children’s literature.

She is an active ambassador for the Books in Homes Program and has served as the joint SCBWI Coordinator for Southern Tasmania.

Booth currently lives in Tasmania.

== Awards and honours ==
- 2010 – Honour Book – Children’s Book Council of Australia (CBCA) Book of the Year: Early Childhood – Kip
- 2014 – Winner – Environment Award for Children’s Literature – Welcome Home
- 2020 – Shortlisted – Prime Minister’s Literary Awards: Children’s Literature – One Careless Night
- 2020 – Winner – Royal Zoological Society of NSW - Whitley Award (Best Children's Book) – One Careless Night
- 2020 - Shortlisted – Speech Pathology Australia Book of the Year awards – birth to 3 years. Are these Hen's Eggs?

== Selected bibliography ==
=== Fiction ===
- Potato Music (2010): Illustrated by Christina Booth, written by Jennifer Beck.
- Aussie Kids: Meet Dooley on the Farm (2020): Written by Sally Odgers, illustrated by Christina Booth.

=== Non-Fiction ===
- This Is Captain Cook (2015): Written by Tania McCartney, illustrated by Christina Booth.
- Wedge-tailed Eagle (2024): Written by Claire Saxby, illustrated by Christina Booth.

=== Picture books ===
- Kip (2009): Written and illustrated by Christina Booth.
- Welcome Home, Whales (2013): Written and illustrated by Christina Booth.
- Too Many Sheep (2014): Written and illustrated by Christina Booth.
- Are These Hen's Eggs? (2020): Written and illustrated by Christina Booth.
- One Careless Night (2019): Written and illustrated by Christina Booth.
- Purinina: A Devil's Tale (2024): Written and illustrated by Christina Booth.
- Mother Earth (2023): Written by Libby Hathorn, illustrated by Christina Booth.
