= Gus Gordon =

Children's book illustrator and writer

Gus Gordon (born in Sydney, 1971) is a children's book illustrator and writer based in Brisbane, Australia.

Gordon has written and illustrated over 70 books for children.

Gordon's book 'Herman and Rosie' was chosen as the 2013 "Read for Australia" book and won the 2013 CBCA 'Honour Award' for best picture book. It was also shortlisted for the 2014 German Youth Literature Award, the Sakura Medal in Japan and the 2014/2015 Les Incorruptibles prize in France.

== Recent works ==
- Big Pet Day by Lisa Shanahan (2014)
- I am Cow, Hear me Moo! by Jill Esbaum (2014)
- My Life & Other Stuff that Went Wrong by Tristan Bancks (2014)
- Herman and Rosie (2012)
- Somewhere Else (2017)
- The Last Peach (2019)
- Into the Bewilderness (2025)

== Awards and nominations ==
- 2026: Shortlisted for the Patricia Wrightson Prize for Children's Literature, NSW Premier's Literary Awards for Into the Bewilderness
- In 2014 his book Herman and Rosie was nominated for the 2014 Deutscher Jugendliteratupreis (German Youth Literature Award)
- In 2013 his book Herman and Rosie, was awarded 'The Honour Book' award in the Children's Book Council of Australia (CBCA) 2013 Book of the Year Awards - Picture Book category.
- In 2013 his book Herman and Rosie, was selected as the National Literacy and Numeracy Week's (NLNW) ' Read For Australia' book, where a book is simultaneously read on a chosen day in schools and libraries across the country.
- In 2011 his illustrated book Haggis McGregor and the Night of the Skull Moon, written by Jen Storer was shortlisted as a finalist for the 2010 Aurealis Award, an Australian award for excellence in speculative fiction - Children's Fiction category.
- In 2010 his book Wendy, was selected as a Children's Book Council of Australia (CBCA) Notable Book in the 2010 Book of the Year Awards - Picture Book category.
- In 2009 his book A Day With Noodles, was shortlisted for the Speech Pathology Australia Book of the Year Awards - Young Children.
- In 2008 his illustrated book The Undys: Let's Get Physical, written by Michael Wagner, was shortlisted for the W.A. Young Readers Book Award (WAYRA) - Young Reader.
- In 2007 his illustrated book Born to Bake, written by Phillip Gwynne, was shortlisted for the Children's Peace Literature Award (PEACE).
- In 2005 his illustrated book To the Moon and Back, written by Jackie French and Bryan Sullivan, was awarded the CBCA Children's Book of the Year Award: Eve Pownall Award for Information Books.
