= Stephen Matthews =

Stephen Matthews may refer to:

- Stephen Matthews (linguist), professor of linguistics at the University of Hong Kong
- Stephen Matthews (writer), Australian author and publisher of children's books

== See also ==
- Steven Matthews, Irish Green Party politician
