= Bronte Clucas Quayle =

Australian barrister and civil servant

- Bronte Clucas Quayle
- Born: 24 October 1919; North Adelaide, Australia
- Died: 12 October 1986 (aged 66); Canberra, Australia
- Education: St Peter's College, Adelaide, University of Adelaide
- Occupations: Barrister; Civil servant; Military officer; Solicitor
- Years active: 1940–1981
- Notable work: Drafted Constitution of Pakistan of 1962; Solicitor – Supreme Court of South Australia; Introduced on-the-job training system for Commonwealth nations
- Children: 2
- Parents: Alfred Charles Clucas Quayle (father); Edith Annie – née Turbill (mother)
- Awards: Order of the Bath; Order of the British Empire; Sitara-e-Pakistan

Bronte Clucas Quayle, CB, OBE, SPK, QC (/ˈkwɛilə/; 24 October 1919 – 12 October 1986) was an Australian barrister, civil servant, military officer and solicitor who served the first Australian parliamentary draftsman, and was later appointed Queen's Counsel for Canberra in 1978. He also served in the Attorney-General's Department in 1950. He drafted the 1962 Constitution of Pakistan as a consultant drafter.

As a draftsman, Quayle was actively involved in regulating the inquiries about the use of computers in drafting legislative legal work, and made a comprehensive study about Commonwealth nations, specifically about Australia.

== Education ==
Quayle was born on 24 October 1919 in North Adelaide. Quayle attending the St Peter's College, Adelaide, and later department of law at the University of Adelaide where he graduated with an LL.B degree in 1948.

== Career ==
=== Army career ===
Quayle completed his education, and was enlisted in the Australian Imperial Force on 19 September 1940, and later promoted to the rank of corporal. In November 1940, Quayle was posted in Palestine where he served in the Royal Australian Army Pay Corps. In 1942 he returned to Australia and served as a staff sergeant in paymaster's offices in Victoria as well as in Queensland. In 1944, he was promoted to the rank of warrant officer and served in administrative offices. From March 1944 to January 1946, he served in Australian Army for south division.

=== Legal career ===
In 1947, Quayle resumed his law studies and became a recipient of a Stow Prize. On 15 December 1947 he served as a barrister and solicitor for the Supreme Court of South Australia. In 1950 he joined the first parliamentary drafting division, and later served in the office of Parliamentary Counsel for Canberra from 1970 and subsequently served at second parliamentary counsel. In 1977 Quayle became the first parliamentary counsel, and later he was appointed a Queen's Counsel in 1978.

Quayle specialised in drafting bills, taxation systems and in "retirement-benefits legislation for public servants" as well as members of the defence force. He earned appreciation from the ministers of the National Party of Australia and the Australian Labor Party for reasonable explanations of complex provisions to parliamentarians and civil servants. In 1962, he drafted the Constitution of Pakistan; later the Government of Pakistan awarded him Sitara-e-Pakistan in recognition of his contribution to the new constitution of the country. Quayle was actively involved in state uniformity. As a lawyer and draftsman, he introduced an on-the-job training system, leading an experienced draftsman to work with a newcomer drafter. He was among the other founders of the Commonwealth Association of Legislative Counsel which was aimed at to establish foreign relations of drafters associated with the Commonwealth sovereign states.

In 1969 he was appointed an officer for Order of the British Empire (OBE), and in 1979 a Commander of the Order of the Bath (CB). Quayle retired from the legal services in 1981.

=== Later work ===
Quayle was a member of the Canberra Yacht Club, Sporting Car Club, and also Wine and Food clubs.

== Personal life ==
Quayle was born to Alfred Charles Clucas Quayle from the Isle of Man, and his mother Edith Annie (née Turbill) was from New South Wales. He had two sons. Quayle died of heart failure on 12 October 1986 in Canberra, Australia.
