= Diary of a Wombat =

2002 picture book by Jackie French and Bruce Whatley

- The cover of Diary of a Wombat, illustrated by Bruce Whatley.
- Author: Jackie French
- Illustrator: Bruce Whatley
- Cover artist: Bruce Whatley
- Language: English
- Series: Shaggy Gully books
- Genre: Children's picture book
- Publisher: Clarion Books
- Publication date: 2002
- Publication place: Australia
- Followed by: Pete the Sheep

Diary of a Wombat is a 2002 award-winning picture book written by Jackie French and illustrated by Bruce Whatley. It is the first in the Shaggy Gully books, and is one of the most popular of French's works.

== Shaggy Gully books ==
1. Diary of a Wombat (2002)
2. Pete the Sheep (2004), published as Pete the Sheep-Sheep in the US
3. Josephine Wants to Dance (2006), published as Josephine Loves to Dance in the US
4. The Shaggy Gully Times (2007)
5. Emily and the Big Bad Bunyip (2008)
6. Baby Wombat's Week (2009)
7. Christmas Wombat (2011)

== Awards ==
- Won - American Library Association Notable Children's Book
- Won - Canberra's Own Outstanding List Award for Best Picture Book (2003)
- Won - Young Australian Readers' Award (2003)
- Won - Kids Own Australian Literature Award: Best Picture Book (2003)
- Won - ABA/A A Neilson Book of the Year (2003)
- Won - Benjamin Franklin Award, United States (2004)
- Won - Lemmee Award, United States (2004)
- Won - KIND Award, United States (2004)
- Won - Kids' Reading Oz Choice Award (2007)
- Won - Books I Love Best Yearly Award (2008)
- Honour - CBCA Children's Book of the Year Award: Picture Book (2003)
- Shortlisted - Young Australian Best Book Award (2003)
- Shortlisted - Australian Publisher's Association Book Design Awards for Best Designed Children's Picture Book (2003)
- Shortlisted - Galley Club Award, Picture Book category of the Children's Choice Book Awards (2003)
- Shortlisted - Books I Love Best Yearly Award (2004)
- Shortlisted - Book Sense Book of the Year Award: Children's Illustrated Book (2004)
- Shortlisted - Books I Love Best Yearly Award (2007)
- Voted Favourite Picture Book of the Year in the Cuffie Awards in the USA
- Tied with Diary of a Worm for Funniest Book in the Cuffie Awards in the United States (2003)
- Number two on the 'Best 20 picture books for 2003' in the United States (2003)
