= Ginninderra Press =

Australian publisher

Ginninderra Press is an Australian independent publisher.

Founded in 1996 in Canberra by Stephen Matthews OAM, it takes its name from an Aboriginal word meaning "throwing out little rays of light" and from its original location in the Australian Capital Territory. In 2007 it moved to Port Adelaide in South Australia.

Ginninderra Press has been described by The Canberra Times as "versatile and visionary". In 2003 it published How Did the Fire Know We Lived Here?: Canberra's Bush Fires January 2003 to raise funds for the Canberra Bushfire Recovery Appeal. It sponsored two ACT Literary Awards, the Ginninderra Press Short Story Competition (2000–2005) and the Ginninderra Press Short Story Competition for Children (2000–2006).

In the 2021 Australia Day Honours its founder, Stephen Matthews, was awarded the Medal of the Order of Australia for "service to publishing".

To celebrate its 20 years of operation Joan Fenney edited Rays of light: Ginninderra Press – the first 20 years.

Notable authors, including Warwick Anderson, Natalie D-Napoleon, John Foulcher, Sonya Hartnett, Tim Metcalf and Kel Robertson, have had works published by Ginninderra.
