= John Nicholson (author) =

Australian children's author

- Occupation: Author, illustrator
- Genre: Children's literature, information books
- Years active: 1986–present
- Notable works: The First Fleet (1996); A Home Among the Gum Trees (1997); Animal Architects (2003)
- Notable awards: Eve Pownall Award for Information Books (multiple)

John Nicholson is an Australian children's author born in Singapore. He originally worked as an architect, graphic designer and illustrator before taking up writing in 1990.

John lives in the Victorian bush with his wife Jenny and daughter Freda in a solar-powered house they both built themselves. From his books, John has won the Children's Book Council of Australia Eve Pownall Award three times and shortlisted six times, shortlisted for WA Premier's Children's Book Award, and the Australian Awards for Excellence in Educational Publishing.

== Writing and illustrating ==
- The Australian Woolshed: Build Your Own Model Woolshed (1986)
- Justice and the Courts (1986) - illustrator only
- Hello Listeners! (1988) - illustrator only
- The Amazing Adventures of Amabel (1990) - illustrator only
- Amabel Abroad: More Amazing Adventures (1991) - illustrator only
- Bridges (1992)
- Paper Chase: A Frantic Dash Around the World by Land, Sea and Air (1993)
- Homemade Houses: Traditional Homes From Many Lands (1993)
- Goddess (1993) - one hour TV drama
- The Cruelest Place on Earth: Stories from Antarctica (1994)
- Gold! The Fascinating Story of Gold in Australia (1995)
- The First Fleet: A New Beginning in an Old Land (1996) (Eve Pownall Award)
- Explorers of Australia (1996)
- A Home Among the Gum Trees: The Story of Australian Houses (1997) (Eve Pownall Award)
- Kimberley Warrior: The Story of Jandamarra (1997)
- Ned's Kang-u-roo (1997) - illustrator only
- Who's Running This Country: Government in Australia (1998)
- Fishing For Islands: Traditional Boats and Seafarers of the Pacific (1999) (Eve Pownall Award)
- The State of the Planet (2000)
- Building the Sydney Harbour Bridge (2001)
- Solo Transport: Trains (2001)
- Solo Transport: Ships (2001)
- Heritage Masks (2001) - illustrator only
- Mighty Murray (2002)
- Animal Architects (2003) (Eve Pownall Award)
- The Incomparable Captain Cadell (2004) - for adults
- Australia Locked Up (2006)
- White Chief: The Colourful Life and Times of Judge F.E. Maning of the Hokianga (2006) - for adults
- Transport, Trade and Travel in Australia: Songlines and Stone Axes (2007)
- Transport, Trade and Travel in Australia: Cedar, Seals and Whaling Ships (2007)
- Transport, Trade and Travel in Australia: Wool, Wagons and Clipper Ships (2008)
- Transport, Trade and Travel in Australia: Steam, Steel and Speed (2008)
- Transport, Trade and Travel in Australia: 100 Years of Petrol Power (2009)
