= Dr Pimms, Intermillennial Sleuth =

Book series by L.J.M. Owen

The Dr Pimms, Intermillennial Sleuth series, also known as the Dr Pimms novels, is a series of books written by Queanbeyan-based author L.J.M. Owen.

Owen has a similar background to the main character, sharing studies in archaeology and librarianship, and received her Doctor of Philosophy in paleogenetics from the Australian National University (ANU) in 2003. The forensic science techniques and approaches in the Dr Pimms novels are based on Owen's studies and experience at the ANU.

Her goal in writing the series is to promote women's roles throughout history.

== Series focus and settings ==
The series focuses on Dr Elizabeth Pimms, who works at the National Library of Australia in Canberra, and also investigates archaeological mysteries. The setting is a semi-fictional version of Canberra, as the version of the National Library includes the fictional Mahoney Griffin Library. Each book contrasts Dr Pimms' Canberra setting, with that of the featured archaeological investigation.

- The first book, Olmec Obituary, was successfully funded through a Kickstarter campaign. Several days after the crowdfunding campaign, Owen was contacted by Angela Meyer, a commissioning editor of Echo Publishing for a book deal. This resulted in multiple editions of Olmec Obituary: a limited edition run (May 2015), and an Echo version (November 2015).
- The second book, Mayan Mendacity, was published in 2016. It features local landmarks including Queanbeyan's Benedict House, the Australian National Botanic Gardens, and Canty's Bookshop in Fyshwick.
- The third book, Egyptian Enigma, was published in March 2018.

== Plots ==
Olmec Obituary focuses on the discovery of a royal Olmec cemetery, and how Dr Elizabeth Pimms investigates the related skeletons and artefacts.

Mayan Mendacity focuses on the reign of Lady Six Sky in the Mayan Empire, and again contrasts with present-day Canberra, where Dr Pimms studies the case.

Egyptian Enigma again contrasts a "cold case" with Dr Pimms' daily life in Canberra, and opens with her travels to Egypt.

== Awards ==
=== Writing ===
Olmec Obituary was longlisted in the Davitt Award (Best Adult Crime Novel, 2016). It was also shortlisted (and later, highly commended) in the ACT Writing and Publishing Awards (Fiction, 2016).

Mayan Mendacity was also longlisted in the Davitt Award (Best Adult Crime Novel, 2017).

=== Book cover ===
There have been two different covers for Olmec Obituary: the Kickstarter edition, and a later version through Echo Publishing, designed by Josh Durham. Durham has also designed the cover for Mayan Mendacity in the same style. Durham's cover design for Olmec Obituary was shortlisted (but did not win) in the Australian Book Designers Association (ABDA) Book Design Awards (Best Designed Commercial Fiction Book, 2017).

== Reviews ==
=== Olmec Obituary ===
Olmec Obituary has been reviewed by book critics:

- Book review of Olmec Obituary by Erich Mayer on Artshub
- Book review of Olmec Obituary by Fiona Hardy on Books+Publishing
- Book review of Olmec Obituary by Karen on Austcrime
- Book review of Olmec Obituary by Hente Corinne in the Daily Telegraph
- Book review of Olmec Obituary by Shirley Stephenson in The West Australian
- Book review of Olmec Obituary by Clive Hodges in Good Reading

=== Mayan Mendacity ===
Mayan Mendacity has been reviewed by book critics:

- Book review of Mayan Mendacity by Linda Morris in The Sun-Herald
- Book review of Mayan Mendacity by Shari Tagliabue in the Cairns Post
- Book review of Mayan Mendacity by author Isobel Blackthorn on Sisters in Crime

== Interviews ==
After publishing the first two books in the series, Owen was interviewed by Lish Fejer about the publication process. Owen was also interviewed by Lizzie Howe of ACT Writers' Centre about the series.

== The Dr Pimms, Intermillennial Sleuth series (novels) ==
#	Title	Publisher	Release
1	Olmec Obituary	Kickstarter edition (later: Echo Publishing)	2015
2	Mayan Mendacity	Echo Publishing	2016
3	Egyptian Enigma	Echo Publishing	2018
4	Mongolian Mayhem	Echo Publishing	TBC
