= Stephen Matthews (writer) =

Australian author and publisher

- Born: 1946; Chichester, England
- Died: 25 September 2024 (aged 77–78); Port Adelaide, South Australia, Australia
- Education: University of Cambridge
- Occupations: Author; Publisher; Editor
- Known for: Founder of Ginninderra Press
- Notable work: Dreams; Secrets (editor); Telling Australia's Truth
- Awards: Medal of the Order of Australia (OAM, 2021)

Stephen Matthews (1946 – 25 September 2024) was an Australian author and publisher.

Matthews was born in Chichester, England and was educated at Cambridge University. He moved from England to Australia in 1979 and after stints in the Northern Territory and Adelaide he settled in Canberra. In 1996 he established Ginninderra Press. He moved to Adelaide in 2008 and died in Port Adelaide on 25 September 2024, bequeathing Ginninderra Press to Debbie Lee. He had published around 3000 titles and printed over 300,000 books.

He received a medal of the Order of Australia (OAM) for service to publishing in 2021. In 2007 he won the ACT Writing and Publishing Awards for best children's book, Secrets which he edited.

Matthews was a co-founder of Canberra's Voice magazine

== Works ==
=== Editor ===
- Telling Australia's Truth, Ginninderra Press, 2024, anthology poetry
- Milestones, Ginninderra Press, 2021, anthology poetry
- I Protest! Poems of Dissent, Ginninderra Press, 2020, anthology poetry
- Secrets: Stories, Ginninderra Press, 2006, anthology children's fiction
- Lost: Stories, Ginninderra Press, 2005, anthology short story for children
- Refuge: Stories, Ginninderra Press, 2004, anthology children's fiction
- Danger: Stories, Ginninderra Press, 2003, anthology children's fiction
- How Did the Fire Know We Lived Here? Canberra's Bushfires, Ginninderra Press, 2003, anthology short stories and prose
- Not Theirs the Shame Who Fight: edited selections from the World War I diaries, poems and letters of 6080 Private R. C. (Cleve) Potter, A Company 21st Battalion A.I.F. by Reynold Cleve Potter
- The Eye of the Soul: Interviews with Seventeen of the Younger Generation of Australians Writing for Children and Young Adults, Magpies Magazine, 1998, anthology criticism, biography and interview

=== Author ===
- Dreams, Ginninderra Press, 2002, anthology children's fiction
