= Graeme Barrow =

Australian author

Graeme Thomas Barrow OAM (16 June 1936 – 15 May 2017) was an Australian author best known for his bushwalking guide books and books on local history. Almost all his 28 books have been self-published through his business, Dagraja Press, established in 1977.

He was born in Greymouth, New Zealand, on 16 June 1936 and received an education of sorts with the Marist Brothers, leaving school at 15 1/2 years of age. He became an apprentice hand compositor on the local newspaper, the Greymouth Evening Star, and later when he was 17 or 18 began writing articles for the paper while still an apprentice. He was encouraged by the editor George Gaffney and, following his interest and involvement as a player in the sport, became the paper's cricket writer. Barrow covered local games played at weekends and wrote his reports on Sunday evenings. These were based on the match he had played in and on scorebooks he collected from other games, and published in the following day's paper.

About the time his apprenticeship concluded and he became a tradesman Barrow noticed an advertisement for a junior reporter on the Ashburton Guardian, published in the small town of Ashburton, south of Christchurch in New Zealand's South Island. He applied for the position and was appointed, taking up the job in January 1957.

In 2006 he won the non-fiction section of the ACT Writing and Publishing Awards for his book Unlocking History's Secrets.

Barrow was a Member of the Canberra and District Historical Society from 1976 to 2017 and editor of its journal Canberra Historical Journal from 1979 to 1986 and 2002 to 2007. He was awarded life membership in 2010.

Barrow was awarded an OAM in the 2017 Queen's Birthday Honours for "service to local history, and the community of the Australian Capital Territory".

== Works ==
- Canberra's embassies, Graeme Barrow, Australian National University Press, Canberra, 1978, ISBN 0-7081-1060-6
- The bushranger papers, ed. Graeme Barrow, Canberra & District Historical Society, 1979, ISBN 0-909655-06-5
- Canberra region car tours, Graeme Barrow, Australian National University Press, Canberra, 1981, ISBN 0-7081-1087-8
- 25 Family Bushwalks in and around Canberra, Graeme Barrow, Dagraja Press, Canberra, 1981, ISBN 0-9596877-1-8
- John Gale's Brindabellas and Australian Alps, ed. Graeme Barrow, Dagraja Press, Canberra, 1985, ISBN 0-9596877-2-6
- Walking the South Coast - Tracks from Nowra to Eden, Graeme Barrow, Dagraja Press, Canberra, 1986, ISBN 0-9596877-3-4
- Exploring Namadgi and Tidbinbilla - Day Walks in Canberra's High Country, Graeme Barrow, Dagraja Press, Canberra, 1987, ISBN 0-9596877-4-2
- Walking Canberra's Hills and Rivers - with an excursion to the Googong Foreshores, Graeme Barrow, Dagraja Press, Canberra, 1989, ISBN 0-9596877-5-0
- Riding Canberra's bike paths : a commuter/tourist cycling guide, Graeme Barrow, Dagraja Press, Canberra, 1990, ISBN 0-9596877-6-9
- Old Bungendore : changing times in an Australian village, Graeme Barrow, Dagraja, Canberra, 1991, ISBN 0-9596877-8-5
- Walking the South Coast : tracks from Nowra to Eden, Graeme Barrow, Dagraja Press, Canberra, 1993, ISBN 0-9596877-9-3
- Canberra's historic houses : dwellings and ruins of the 19th Century, Graeme Barrow, Dagraja Press, Canberra, 1998, ISBN 0-9587552-2-1
- Namadgi & Tidbinbilla Classics, Graeme Barrow, Dagraja Press, Canberra, 2000, ISBN 0-9587552-3-X
- Walking from the mountains to the Sea, Graeme Barrow, Dagraja Press, Canberra, 2002, ISBN 0-9587552-5-6
- 30 Family Bushwalks in and around Canberra, Graeme Barrow, Dagraja Press, Canberra, 2002, ISBN 0-9587552-4-8
- Terror and the Scenic Coast, Graeme Barrow, Dagraja Press, Canberra, 2004, ISBN 0-9587552-6-4
- Unlocking History's Secrets, Graeme Barrow, Dagraja Press, Canberra, 2005, ISBN 0-9587552-7-2
- In search of the Barrow boys : John Arthur Barrow, William Henry Worth Barrow, Graeme Barrow, Dagraja Press, Canberra, 2006, ISBN 0977532801
- The Prime Minister's Lodge : Canberra's unfinished business, Graeme Barrow, Dagraja Press, Canberra, 2008, ISBN 9780977532810
- Exploring Tidbinbilla on foot : twenty bushwalks in Canberra's resurrected nature reserve, Graeme Barrow, Dagraja Press, Canberra, 2009, ISBN 9780977532827
- Exploring Namadgi on foot : 40 bushwalks in Canberra's national park, Graeme Barrow, Dagraja Press, Canberra, 2010, ISBN 9780977532841
- Who lied? : the Ly-ee-Moon disaster and a question of truth, Graeme Barrow, Dagraja Press, Canberra, 2010, ISBN 9780977532834
- Magnificent' Lake George : the biography, Graeme Barrow, Dagraja Press, Canberra, 2012, ISBN 9780977532858
- The Northies' saga: Fifty years of club cricket with North Canberra Gungahlin, by Graeme Barrow, Dagraja Press, Canberra, 2013, ISBN 9780977532865
- Walking Canberra : 101 ways to see Australia's national capital on foot, by Graeme Barrow, Dagraja Press, Canberra, 2014, ISBN 9780977532872
- God's architect : the churches and parsonages of Alberto Soares, by Graeme Barrow, Dagraja Press, Canberra, 2013, ISBN 9780977532889
