= The White Ship (French novel) =

2002 novel by Jackie French

- First edition
- Author: Jackie French
- Language: English
- Genre: Historical fiction, children's literature
- Publisher: HarperCollins
- Publication date: 2002
- Publication place: Australia

The White Ship is a 2002 historical novel by Australian children's author Jackie French. The novel, set in 1572, follows the journey of a group of Protestant children who are forced to flee their home, an island off the coast of France, upon a defecting warship known as "The White Ship", after Catherine de' Medici orders the deaths of all French Huguenots.
