= Smoke and Mirrors (novel) =

Book by Kel Robertson

- Author: Kel Robertson
- Language: English
- Genre: Novel
- Publisher: Ginninderra Press, Australia
- Publication date: 2008
- Publication place: Australia
- Media type: Print (Paperback)
- Pages: 258
- ISBN: 9781740274920
- Preceded by: Dead Set
- Followed by: Rip Off

Smoke and Mirrors is 2008 crime novel by Australian author Kel Robertson. It won the 2009 Ned Kelly Award for Best Fiction. It is the second novel in the author's series about Australian Chinese Federal Police detective Brad Chen.

== Abstract ==
Renowned detective Brad Chen is drawn back into active duty following the double murder of a Whitlam government minister and the editor of his political memoirs. The body count rises as Chen uncovers the deadly secret behind the most momentous events in Australian political history.

== Reviews ==
- AustCrime Blog
- Fair Dinkum Crime

== Publication history ==
After the novel's original publication in 2008 by Ginninderra Press, it was reprinted later that same year by the same publisher.

In 2010 it was reprinted by Pan Macmillan.

== Awards and nominations ==
- 2009 won Ned Kelly Award for Best Fiction - joint winner with Deep Water by Peter Corris

== See also ==
- 2008 in Australian literature
