= Children's Book of the Year Award: Eve Pownall Award for Information Books =

Australian literary award from 1988

- Awarded for: Excellence in Australian early childhood books
- Country: Australia
- Presented by: Children's Book Council of Australia
- First award: 1988
- Website: http://cbca.org.au/index.htm

The Children's Book of the Year Award: Eve Pownall Award for Information Books was first presented in 1988, when the award was financed by Eve Pownall's family. Since 1993 it has been awarded annually by the Children's Book Council of Australia (CBCA).

The Award "will be made to outstanding books which have the prime intention of documenting factual material with consideration given to imaginative presentation, interpretation and variation of style. As general guidelines, the judges may consider the relative success of the book in balancing and harmonising the following elements:

- style of language and presentation;
- graphic excellence;
- clarity, appropriateness and aesthetic appeal of illustration;
- integration of text, graphics and illustration to engage interest and enhance understanding;
- overall design of the book to facilitate the presentation of information;
- accuracy with regard to the current state of knowledge."

== Award winners ==
=== 1980s ===
Eve Pownall Award winners, 1988
Year	Author	Title	Publisher
1988	Nadia Wheatley and Donna Rawlins	My Place	Collins Dove

=== 1990s ===
Eve Pownall Award winners, 1990-1999
Year	Author	Title	Publisher
1993	Gracie Greene and Joe Tramacchi, illus. Lucille Gill	Tjarany Roughtail: The Dreaming of the Roughtail Lizard and Other Stories told by the Kukatja	Magabala
1994	Patricia Mullins	V for Vanishing: An Alphabet of Endangered Animals	Margaret Hamilton
1995	Robert E. Stewart	New Faces: The Complete Book of Alternative Pets	Agmedia
1996	John Nicholson	The First Fleet: A New Beginning in an Old Land	Allen & Unwin
1997	Gordon Cheers and Julie Silk, illus. Marjorie Crosby-Fairall	Killer Plants and How to Grow Them	Puffin Books
1998	John Nicholson	A Home Among the Gum Trees: The Story of Australian Houses	Allen & Unwin
1999	John Marsden, illus. Shaun Tan	The Rabbits	Lothian

=== 2000s ===
Eve Pownall Award winners, 2010-2019
Year	Author	Title	Publisher	Ref.
2000	John Nicholson	Fishing for Islands: Traditional Boats and Seafarers of the Pacific	Allen & Unwin	
2001	Dyan Blacklock, illus. David Kennett	Olympia: Warrior Athletes of Ancient Greece	Omnibus Books	
2002	Papunya School Publishing Committee	Papunya School Book of Country and History	Allen & Unwin	
2003	Allan Tucker	Iron in the Blood: Convicts and Commandants in Colonial Australia	Omnibus Books	
2004	John Nicholson	Animal Architects	Allen & Unwin	
2005	Jackie French with Bryan Sullivan, illus. Gus Gordon	To the Moon and Back: The Amazing Australians at the Forefront of Space Travel Plus Fantastic Moon Facts	HarperCollins	
2006	Leon Davidson	Scarecrow Army: The ANZACS at Gallipoli	Black Dog Books	
2007	Mark Norman	The Penguin Book: Birds in Suits	Black Dog Books	
2008	Frances Watts, illus. David Legge	Parsley Rabbit's Book about Books	ABC Books	
2009	Lincoln Hall	Alive in the Death Zone	Random House	

=== 2010s ===
Eve Pownall Award winners, 2010-2019
Year	Author	Title	Publisher	Ref.
2010	Peter Macinnis	Australian Backyard Explorer	National Library of Australia	
2011	Ursula Dubosarsky, illus. Tohby Riddle	The Return of the Word Spy	Viking Books	
2012	Alison Lester and Coral Tulloch	One Small Island: The Story of Macquarie Island	Penguin Group (Australia)	
2013	Kristin Weidenbach, illus. Timothy Ide	Tom the Outback Mailman	Lothian Children's Books, Hachette Australia	
2014	Christopher Faille, illus. Danny Snell	Jeremy	Working Title Press	
2015	Simon Barnard	A-Z of Convicts in Van Diemen's Land	Text Publishing	
2016	Stephanie Owen Reeder	Lennie The Legend: Solo to Sydney by Pony	NLA Publishing	
2017	Gina M. Newton	Amazing Animals of Australia's National Parks	NLA Publishing	
2018	Idan Ben-Barak, illus. Julian Frost	Do Not Lick This Book	Allen & Unwin	
2019	Coral Vass, illus. Dub Leffler	Sorry Day	NLA Publishing	

=== 2020s ===
Eve Pownall Award winners, 2020-present
Year	Author	Title	Publisher	Ref.
2020	Bruce Pascoe	Young Dark Emu: A truer history	Magabala Books	
2021	Pamela Freeman, illus. Liz Anelli	Dry to Dry: The Seasons of Kakadu	Walker Books	
2022	Safdar Ahmed	Still Alive, Notes from Australia's Immigration Detention System	Twelve Panels Press	
2023	Jess McGeachin	DEEP: Delve into hidden worlds	Welbeck Publishing	
2024	Isolde Martyn and Robyn Ridgeway, illus. Louise Hogan	Country Town	Ford Street Publishing	
2025	Aunty Fay Muir and Sue Lawson	Always Was, Always Will Be	Magabala Books	
2026	Stephanie Owen Reeder, illus. Ingrid Bartkowiak	Peculiar Parents	National Library of Australia Publishing	

== See also ==
- List of CBCA Awards
- List of Australian literary awards
