= They Came on Viking Ships =

2005 novel by Jackie French

- Author: Jackie French
- Language: English
- Genre: Children's historical novel
- Publisher: HarperCollins
- Publication date: 30 March 2005
- Publication place: Australia
- Pages: 288 pp
- ISBN: 978-0-207-20011-3
- OCLC: 224273471

They Came on Viking Ships is a children's historical novel by Jackie French, first published in Australia in 2005. In 2007 it was retitled as Slave Girl for its publication in Britain, and Rover for its publication in the United States.

== Plot summary ==
The story focuses on a 12-year-old girl called Hekja. Hekja lives with her mother in a simple village by the sea. Her two brothers and father have all died. At the beginning of the book, she comes to the aid of a small puppy who was attacked by a seagull on the beach. Hekja takes the puppy to the village's witch, Tikka, for her to help heal the puppy. Hekja is told that the puppy was one of the chief's litter, and she had already given it the True Name of Riki Snarfari (Mighty Rover). The puppy was considered the useless one of the litter and apparently had no value. The chief has shown little interest in him and gives him away to Hekja but later becomes jealous of how strong the pup is. Tikka shows the girl how to look after Snarf, as he becomes known affectionately by Hekja.

Eventually, Snarf recovers, and hardly limps at all from the wound. The time comes for Hekja to spend the summer up the mountain with the other girls of the village. It is a tradition of the village for girls to stay on the mountain when they become of age, and the girls look after the cows and produce cheese whilst up the mountain, with the women bringing supplies "twice every full moon". Except for Hekja's best friend, Branna, the other girls are mean or indifferent to Hekja and abuse Snarf.

One foggy day, the girls hear a howl. Hekja goes to investigate and Snarf follows her. Hekja finds a wolf and plans to kill it before it eats one of the calves. The girls hide and try to persuade Hekja to come back and let the wolf take a calf, but Hekja is stubborn, and wherever Hekja goes, Snarf follows. The wolf appears and Snarf bites it around the neck while the wolf is biting the dog's leg. The wolf quickly dies from the bite. Snarf is considered a hero and is treated with respect and Hekja also becomes a hero. Hekja becomes friends with all the other girls and they discover that she has a wonderful singing voice. They were jealous about her making up a song about Snarf so they plead with Hekja to make a song about them.

One day, whilst still up the mountain, Hekja sees strange ships approaching from the distance. At the protests of the other girls, she runs back down to the village, only to see the Viking raiders murdering the village people, including Hekja's mother and the boy she used to love, Bran. Hekja tries to outrun the invaders, but is captured by a woman called Freydis, who is Erik the Red's daughter, and consequently is taken away as a slave.

Hekja hates the Norse and will not share her singing with them, even if it meant that she would not have to mind the cows as a thrall, if they were to hear her sing. She had told one of the Norsemen, Snorri, when he heard her sing that she did not want anybody to know that she can sing because everything has been taken away from her and that if they heard her sing they would take that away from her too. Hekja's spirit and sheer determination means that she soon finds herself joining her mistress Freydis' expedition to Vinland. Hekja befriends Freydis' brother's thrall, Hikki, and he is the only one she will sing to. They develop a firm friendship.

Upon arriving at Vinland, they find the place beautiful and welcoming. Vinland winters are so mild that the cattle can be left out all year round. Freydis and several other women in the colony are pregnant. Hikki proposes to Hekja in due course. Hekja is taken aback, but tells him to wait until she has finished serving her mistress in two years time even though she doesn't love him herself. Freydis also adopts Hekja and is now Hekja's mother.

There is another who is also after Hekja's heart however: the mysterious Snorri the Skald. He seems to like Hekja, but refrains from letting on. Hikki dies in the Viking's Skraeling raid while Snorri is wounded, and after about two months, Hekja marries Snorri the Skald and they are very happy together.

== Awards and nominations ==
- Won – West Australian Young Readers' Book Award: Younger Readers (2007)
- Shortlisted – Essex Book Award (UK)
- Shortlisted – NSW Premier's History Awards: The Young People's History Prize (2006)
