= Rain Stones =

Book by Jackie French

- First edition
- Author: Jackie French
- Language: English
- Genre: Children's fiction
- Publisher: HarperCollins
- Publication date: 1991
- Publication place: Australia

Rain Stones is a 1991 short story collection by Australian author Jackie French. It is notable for being the first children's book written by the author.

== Background ==
Jackie French began writing Rain Stones (having previously written only gardening books) when she was 30, in a desperate attempt to get enough money together to register her car. At the time, she was living in a tin shed with a black snake named Gladys and a wombat named Smudge.

== Awards and nominations ==
- Shortlisted - NSW Premier's Literary Awards: Children's Book Award (1991)
- Shortlisted - CBCA Children's Book of the Year Award: Younger Readers(1992)
- Shortlisted - West Australian Young Readers' Book Award: Primary Age Group (1993)
