= Tim Metcalf =

Australian poet and medical practitioner

Tim Metcalf (b. 1961) is an Australian poet and doctor, described as one of Australia's most published doctor-poets. He resides in Brogo, New South Wales (NSW), and has specialized in remote area medicine since 1984. He has worked in NSW, Victoria, the Northern Territory, and British Columbia. In 2007, he received the ACT Writing and Publishing Awards poetry award for his anthology of poems, Verbal Medicine, which is his fourth book.

== Bibliography ==
- Corvus, Ginninderra Press Canberra 2001 ISBN 1740271149
- Cut to the Word, Ginninderra Press Canberra 2002 ISBN 1740271688
- Into the No Zone, Ginninderra Press Canberra 2003 ISBN 174027167X
- Verbal Medicine, Ginninderra Press, Canberra, 2006 ISBN 1-74027-369-9
- The Solution to Us, Ginninderra Press Adelaide 2008 ISBN 1-74027-473-3
- The Effective Butterfly, Ginninderra Press, Port Adelaide 2010 ISBN 9781740276542
- Last To Go and Other Poems, Picaro Press, Cardiff NSW 2012
- The Underwritten Plain, Ginninderra Press, Port Adelaide 2018 ISBN 9781760415778
- The Moon the Bone: Selected Poems 1986-2022, Ginninderra Press ISBN 9781761096051
