= Somewhere Around the Corner =

Novel by Jackie French

- First edition
- Author: Jackie French
- Language: English
- Genre: Children's historical fiction
- Publisher: Angus and Robertson
- Publication date: 1994
- Publication place: Australia
- ISBN: 0207183597

Somewhere Around the Corner is a children's novel written by Australian author Jackie French. It was her first historical novel, and chronicles the adventures of a homeless girl from 1994 who goes 'around the corner' to another time - the Great Depression.

== Plot ==
When Barbara becomes caught up in a wild demonstration, she is frightened and wants to escape. An old man she meets at the demonstration tells her to close her eyes, walk around the corner and arrive at a better place. She travels back around 62 years and the place she finds is Sydney in 1932, the height of the Depression. Times are tough and people are finding it hard to feed their families.

A boy called Young Jim comes to Barbara's aid and takes her on a journey to meet his family. They offer Barbara the love, security and peace that are missing from her own life and she becomes part of the O'Reilly family. But their time isn't Barbara's time and she may not be able to stay there forever. Young Jim promises to always look after Barbara but what will happen if she is forced to return to her own time? And does she have a choice?

== Awards and nominations ==
- Honour - CBCA Children's Book of the Year Award: Younger Readers (1995)
- Highly Commended - Annual Australian Family Therapists' Award for Children's Literature (1994)
