= Hitler's Daughter =

Book by Jackie French

- Australian first edition cover of Hitler's Daughter.
- Author: Jackie French
- Language: English
- Genre: Children's literature
- Publisher: HarperCollins
- Publication date: 1999 by Jack Williams
- Publication place: Australia

Hitler's Daughter is a children's novel by Australian children's author Jackie French. It was first published in 1999, and is one of French's most critically acclaimed books.

== Synopsis ==
While waiting for their school bus, a group of children tell stories to pass the time. Mark's friend Anna tells a story about Hitler's secret daughter Heidi, a young girl who was kept hidden to maintain the secret of her identity. The other children are captivated by the story, which Anna tells with great detail and realism. As the children listen to the story about Heidi's life, her relationship with her father, and her increasing awareness of Hitler's evil plans, Mark becomes interested in learning more about the actual history of Hitler and World War II, and wonders how he would have acted in Heidi's place. Anna finishes her story with Heidi escaping from the ruins of Berlin and emigrating to Australia, where she grows old and eventually reveals the truth to her granddaughter.

== Awards and nominations ==
- Won - CBCA Children's Book of the Year Award: Younger Readers (2000)
- Won - Sanderson Young Adult Audio Book of the Year Awards: Vision Australia Library (2000)
- Won - UK National Literacy Association WOW! Award
- Won - Semi-Grand Prix Award (Japan)
- Won - Notable Book, US Library Association Notable Book
- Won - Kids Own Australian Literature Award: Roll of Honour (2007)
- Won - Kids Own Australian Literature Award: Roll of Honour (2008)
- Shortlisted - Books I Love Best Yearly: Older Readers Award (2001)
- Shortlisted - West Australian Young Readers' Book Award (2002)
- Shortlisted - Kids Own Australian Literature Award (2002)
- Shortlisted - Canberra's Own Outstanding List (2002)
- Shortlisted - Young Australian Best Book Award (2002)
- Shortlisted - Children's Choice Book Awards: Older Readers
- Shortlisted - Young Australian Best Book Award: Fiction for Older Readers (2007)
- Shortlisted - Young Australian Best Book Award: Fiction for Older Readers (2008)
- Shortlisted - Kids Own Australian Literature Award: Favourite Book of 2008 (2008)
- Named a "Blue Ribbon" book by the Bulletin for the Center of Children's Books in the USA (2003)
- Admitted to the Kids' Own Australian Literature Awards' Hall of Fame

== Adaptations ==
- Hitler's Daughter: The Play, adapted by Monkey Baa Theatre Company
