= Michael Byrne (poet) =

Australian poet, reviewer, anthologist

- Born: 28 April 1978; Sydney, New South Wales, Australia
- Occupation: Poet

Michael Patrick Byrne (born 28 April 1978) is an Australian poet, reviewer, anthologist and freelance poetry tutor. He was born in Sydney, spent his early childhood in Tuross Head on the New South Wales South Coast, and came to Canberra in 1987, where he currently lives. Byrne attended high school at Radford College in Canberra, graduating in 1996. In 1998 he undertook an Arts degree from the Australian National University, completing it in 2001. In 2003 he began a Masters in Journalism from the University of Wollongong, completing it in 2004.

== Awards ==
- 1996: The Canberra Times Young Writers Competition (College Poetry) first prize for ‘Estuary at Dusk’.
- 2006: Winner of the ACT Writing and Publishing Award for Poetry for his book ‘Southbound’.
- 2011: Winner of the ACT Writing and Publishing Award for Poetry for his book 'A Man of Emails'.
- 2012: Winner of the ACT Writing and Publishing Award for Poetry for his anthology ‘The Indigo Book of Australian Prose Poems’.

== Readings ==
- 1999: Young Poets Reading, Chat's Café, ANU Campus.
- 2004: New Voices Reading, Red Belly Black, Civic.
- 2007: Emerging Poets Reading, The God's Café, ANU Campus.
- 2009: Verse in The Vines, Mount Majura Vineyard, Mount Majura.
- 2012: Canberra Poets Reading, The God's Cafe, ANU Campus.
- 2013: Three Poets Reading, Manning Clark House, Canberra.

== Books ==
- 2001: Estuary at Dusk: Poems 1995-2000, Ginninderra Press. ISBN 1-74027-123-8
- 2005: Southbound, Ginninderra Press. ISBN 1-74027-290-0
- 2006: On Common Water (Editor), Ginninderra Press. ISBN 1-74027-362-1
- 2010: A Man of Emails, Ginninderra Press. ISBN 978-1-74027-603-0
- 2011: The Indigo Book of Australian Prose Poems (Editor), Ginninderra Press. ISBN 978-1-74027-650-4
- 2014: New & Selected Poems, Ginninderra Press. ISBN 978-1-74027-884-3
- 2020: A Life in Writing (Autobiography), Ginninderra Press. ISBN 978-1-76041-978-3
