= Pete the Sheep =

2004 picture book by Jackie French

- First edition
- Author: Jackie French
- Illustrator: Bruce Whatley
- Language: English
- Subject: Children's literature, Picture book
- Published: 2004 (Angus & Robertson)
- Publication place: Australia
- Media type: Print (hardback, paperback)
- Pages: 32 (unpaginated)
- ISBN: 9780207199660
- OCLC: 610560470

Pete the Sheep is a 2004 picture book by Jackie French and illustrated by Bruce Whatley. It is about a shearer, Shaun, and his sheep, Pete, who open a hairdressing salon for sheep.

== Reception ==
Booklist, reviewing Pete the Sheep, wrote "This is one extended joke, but the text is so jaunty and the artwork so amusing, it's hard to mind. Most of the fun in the ink-and-watercolor drawings comes from the expressions on the sheep's faces--and, of course, their wild and wacky haircuts. Good for story hours." The School Library Journal was more critical, writing "The creators of Diary of a Wombat (Clarion, 2003) have produced a bit of harmless, silly fluff that, while mildly amusing, is hardly likely to inspire rereading. Whatley's watercolor-and-colored-pencil illustrations are clean and crisp and work nicely with the text, but there is simply not much substance here."

The Horn Book Magazine found that "Whatley's cleanly designed illustrations, which favor subdued colors and lots of white space, work well with French's understated text. Strong lines focus attention on the expressive characters in the well-paced story."

Pete the Sheep has also been reviewed by Kirkus Reviews, Library Media Connection, and January Magazine.

Pete the Sheep featured as 2009's National Simultaneous Storytime selection.
