= Canberra Yacht Club =

Yacht club in Canberra, Australia

Coordinates: 35.2994°S 149.117°E

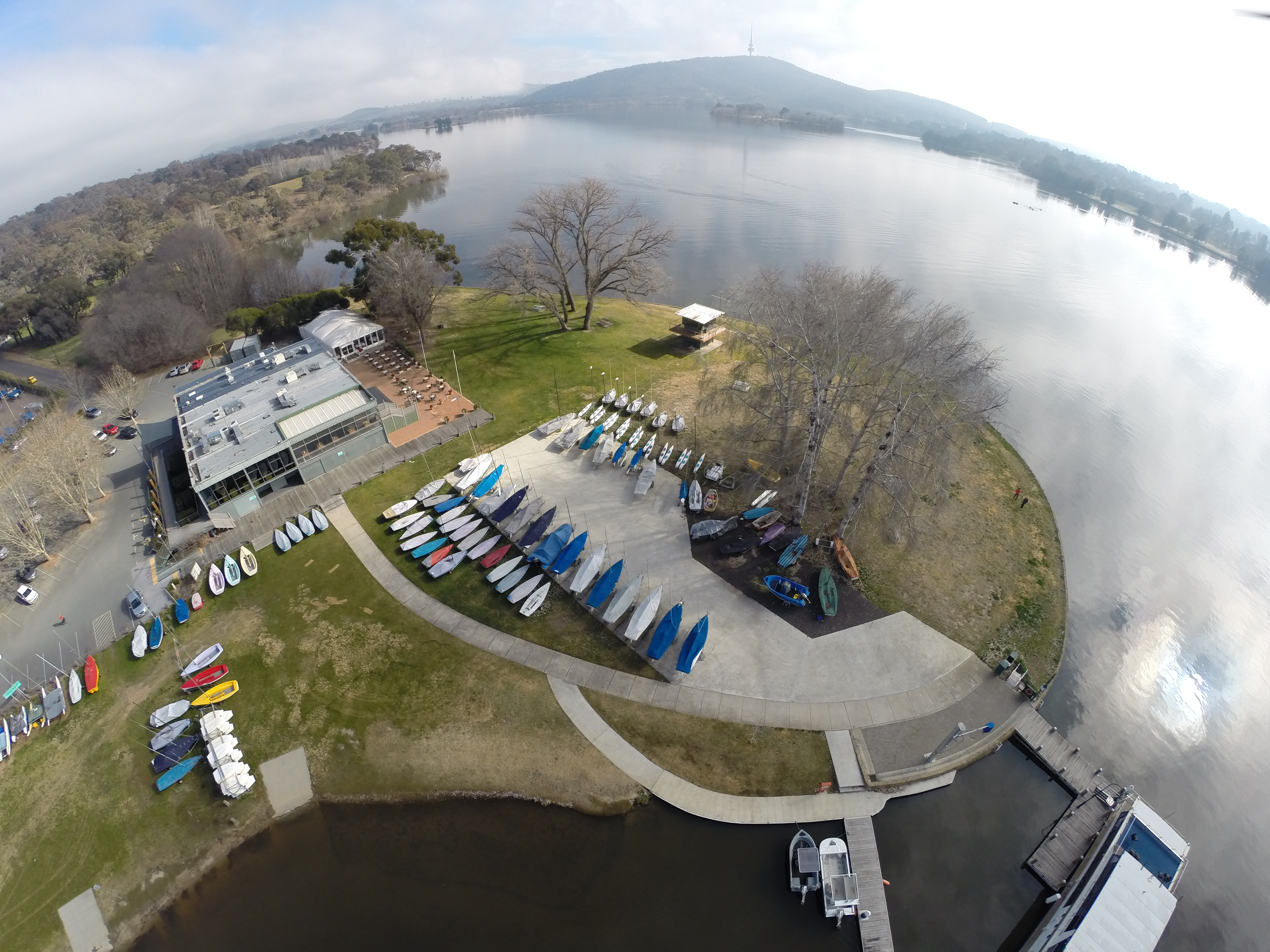
Canberra Yacht Club in Winter

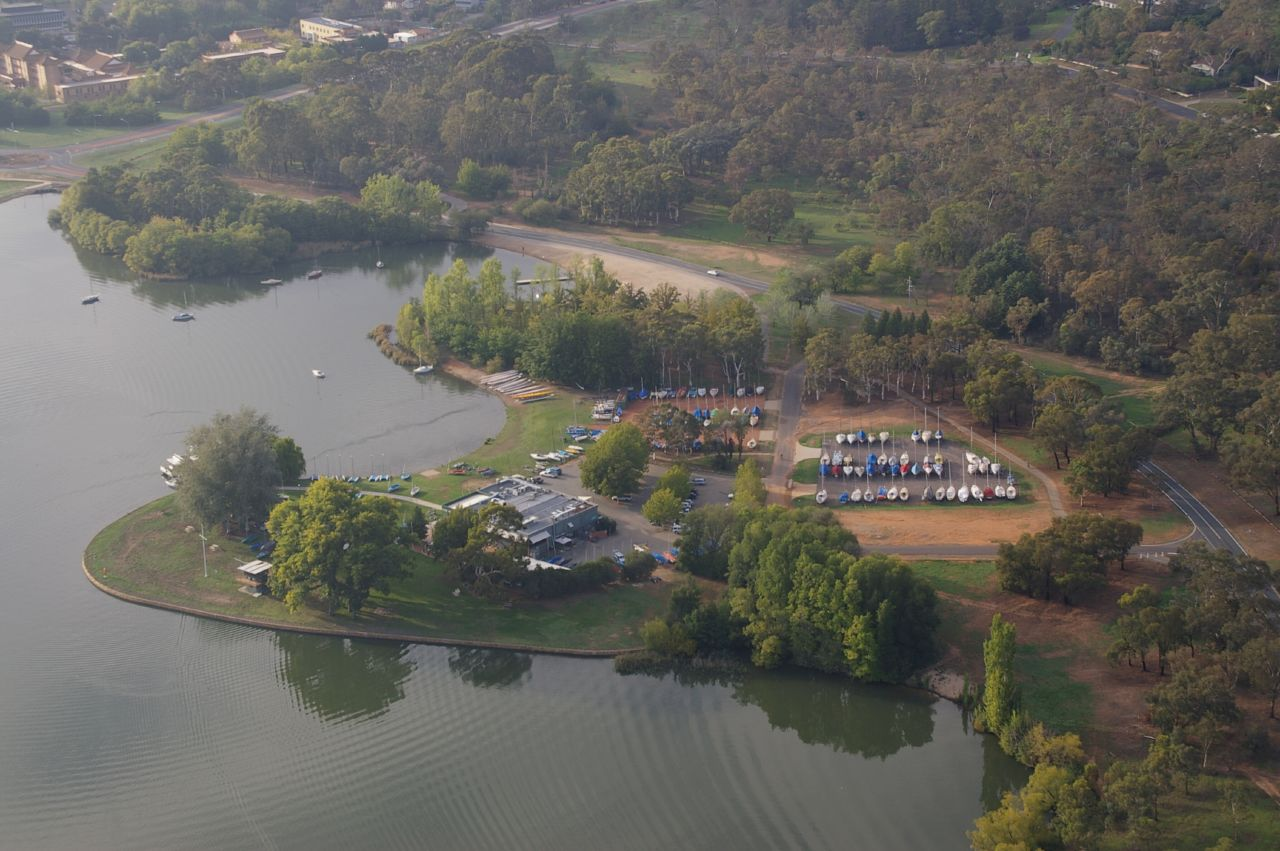
Club house on Lake Burley Griffin

The Canberra Yacht Club was formed in 1959 in anticipation of the creation of Lake Burley Griffin in the centre of Canberra, Australia, which happened in the 1960s. It is located on the shore in the suburb of Yarralumla.

Its members have competed in the Sydney to Hobart yacht race.
