= Kel Robertson =

Australian crime novelist

- Born: Kel Robertson; 1950s New South Wales, Australia
- Occupation: novelist
- Known for: Smoke and Mirrors
- Website: Kel Robertson/Writer

Kel Robertson is an Australian novelist who was born in the 1950s on the south coast of New South Wales. His novel Smoke & Mirrors shared the 2009 Ned Kelly Award for Best Novel, with Deep Water by Peter Corris.

Robertson lived in Sydney and various New South Wales country towns before entering high school in Bathurst. He has studied at a number of tertiary institutions. He resides in Canberra.

He is the author of four novels featuring the Chinese-Australian Federal Police investigator, Brad Chen, two bureaucratic black comedies under the pen name A C Bland, and a futuristic crime novel under the pen name Belle Currer.

== Novels ==
- Dead Set (2006)(2024): Brad Chen 1
- Smoke and Mirrors (2008): Brad Chen 2
- Rip Off (2011): Brad Chen 3
- The Final Trials of Alan Mewling (2016): the first Alan Mewling novel
- The Earlier Trials of Alan Mewling (2019): the second Alan Mewling novel
- Dare to Think (2019): a dystopian crime novel featuring the Cornwall Police Inspector, Melissa Raeburn
- Best Served Cold(2023): Brad Chen 4

== Awards ==
- 2006 shortlisted Ned Kelly Awards — Best First Novel for Dead Set
- 2009 winner Ned Kelly Awards — Best Novel for Smoke and Mirrors
- 2009 winner ACT Writers Centre's Literary Awards — Fiction for Smoke and Mirrors
- 2009 winner Canberra Critics Circle Awards — Writing for Smoke and Mirrors
