= Tania McCartney =

Australian children's author illustrator

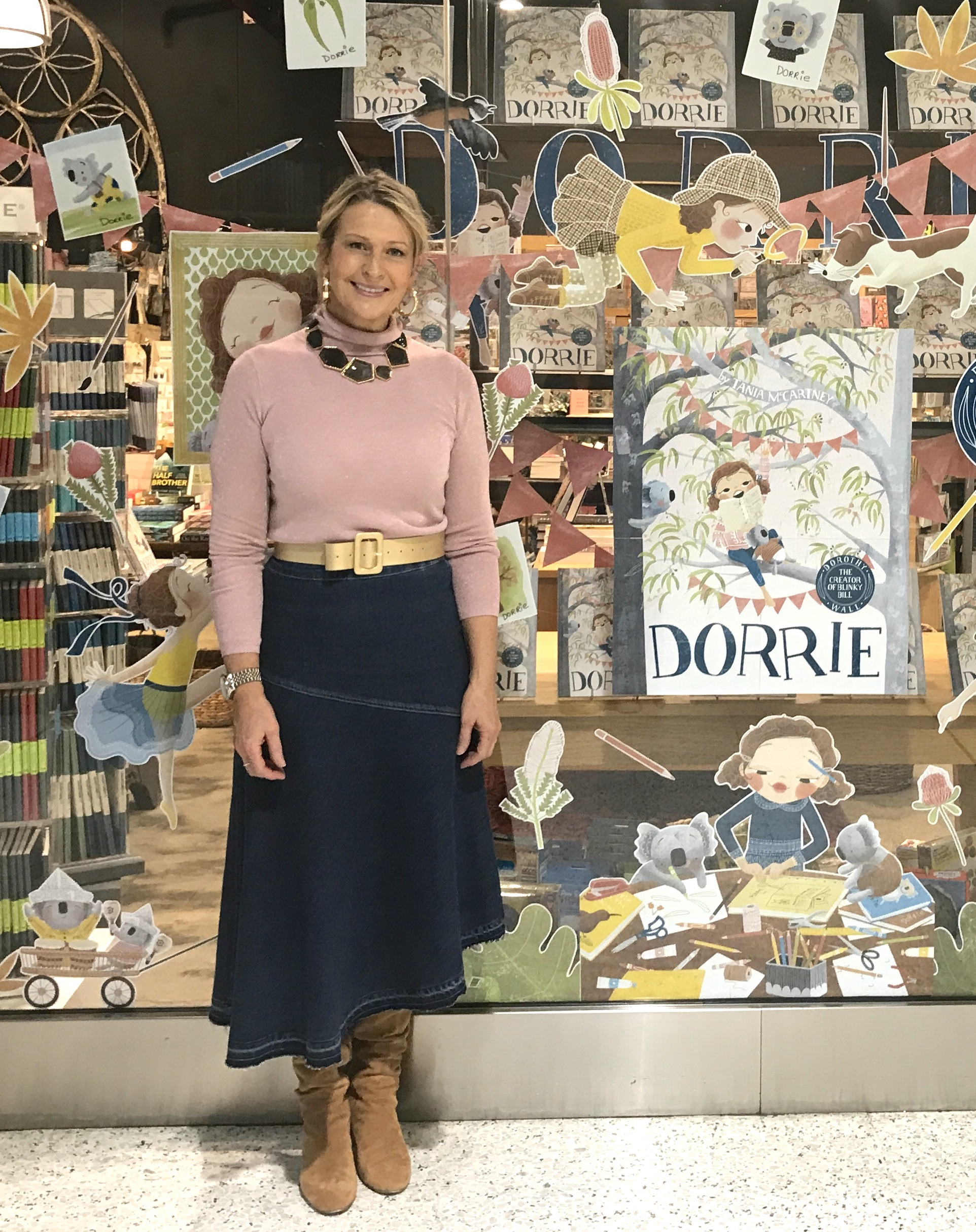
- McCartney in Canberra, Australia, April 2023
- Born: 1968 (age 57–58)
- Occupations: Author; Illustrator; Editor; Designer; Podcaster
- Known for: Children's literature; illustration
- Notable work: Australian Story: An Illustrated Timeline; An Aussie Year; Plume series; Evie and Pog series
- Website: taniamccartney.com

Tania McCartney is an Australian author, illustrator, editor and designer.

== Biography ==
She is perhaps most known for over 65 books for children. She has also written books for adults.

McCartney hosts a podcast called The Happy Book. She is the founder of a book review website, Kids' Book Review. She also founded the 52-Week Illustration Challenge, a Facebook group with thousands of members, which ran from 2014-2018.

She has written for various publications, including The Sydney Morning Herald Tickle the Imagination, Australian Women Online, and Beijing Kids.

== Selected works ==
- Australian Story: An Illustrated Timeline. National Library of Australia, 2012.
- This is Captain Cook. National Library of Australia, 2015.
- Peas in a Pod. EK Books, 2015.
- Smile Cry. EK Books, 2016.
- Australia Illustrated. EK Books, 2016.
- See Hear. EK Books, 2018.
- Australia's Wild Weird Wonderful Weather. National Library of Australia, 2020.
- Ivy Bird. Blue Dot Kids Press, 2020.

=== A Kids’ Year series ===
- An Aussie Year. EK Books, 2013.
- An English Year. EK Books, 2015.
- A Scottish Year. EK Books, 2015.
- A New York Year. EK Books, 2016.
- A Texas Year. EK Books, 2016.
- A Canadian Year. EK Books, 2017.
- A Kiwi Year. EK Books, 2017.

=== Evie and Pog series ===
- Party Perfect! HarperCollins AU, 2020.
- Take Off! HarperCollins AU, 2020.
- Puppy Playtime! HarperCollins AU, 2020.

=== Plume series ===
- Plume, World Explorer. Hardie Grant, 2021.
- Plume, Global Nibbler. Hardie Grant, 2022.
- Plume, Festival Seeker. Hardie Grant, 2022.
- Plume, Christmas Elf. Hardie Grant, 2023.

=== Riley series ===
- Riley and the Sleeping Dragon: A Journey around Beijing. Tania McCartney, 2008.
- Riley and the Dancing Lion: A Journey around Hong Kong. Tania McCartney Press, 2009.
- Riley and the Curious Koala: A Journey around Sydney. Tania McCartney Press, 2010.
- Riley and the Grumpy Wombat: A Journey around Melbourne. Ford Street Publishing, 2011.
- Riley and the Jumpy Kangaroo: A Journey around Canberra. Ford Street Publishing, 2013.
