= To the Moon and Back (book) =

2004 book by Jackie French and Bryan Sullivan

To the Moon and Back: The Amazing Australians at the Forefront of Space Travel Plus Fantastic Moon Facts
- First edition
- Author: Jackie French and Bryan Sullivan
- Illustrator: Sarah Baron
- Language: English
- Subject: Space travel
- Publisher: HarperCollins
- Publication date: 2004
- Publication place: Australia
- Pages: 196
- ISBN: 0207200092

To the Moon and Back: The Amazing Australians at the Forefront of Space Travel Plus Fantastic Moon Facts is a 2004 book co-written by Australian author Jackie French and her husband, Bryan Sullivan. It won the CBCA Children's Book of the Year Award: Eve Pownall Award for Information Books in 2005.
