= Jackie French =

Australian author

Jackie French AM
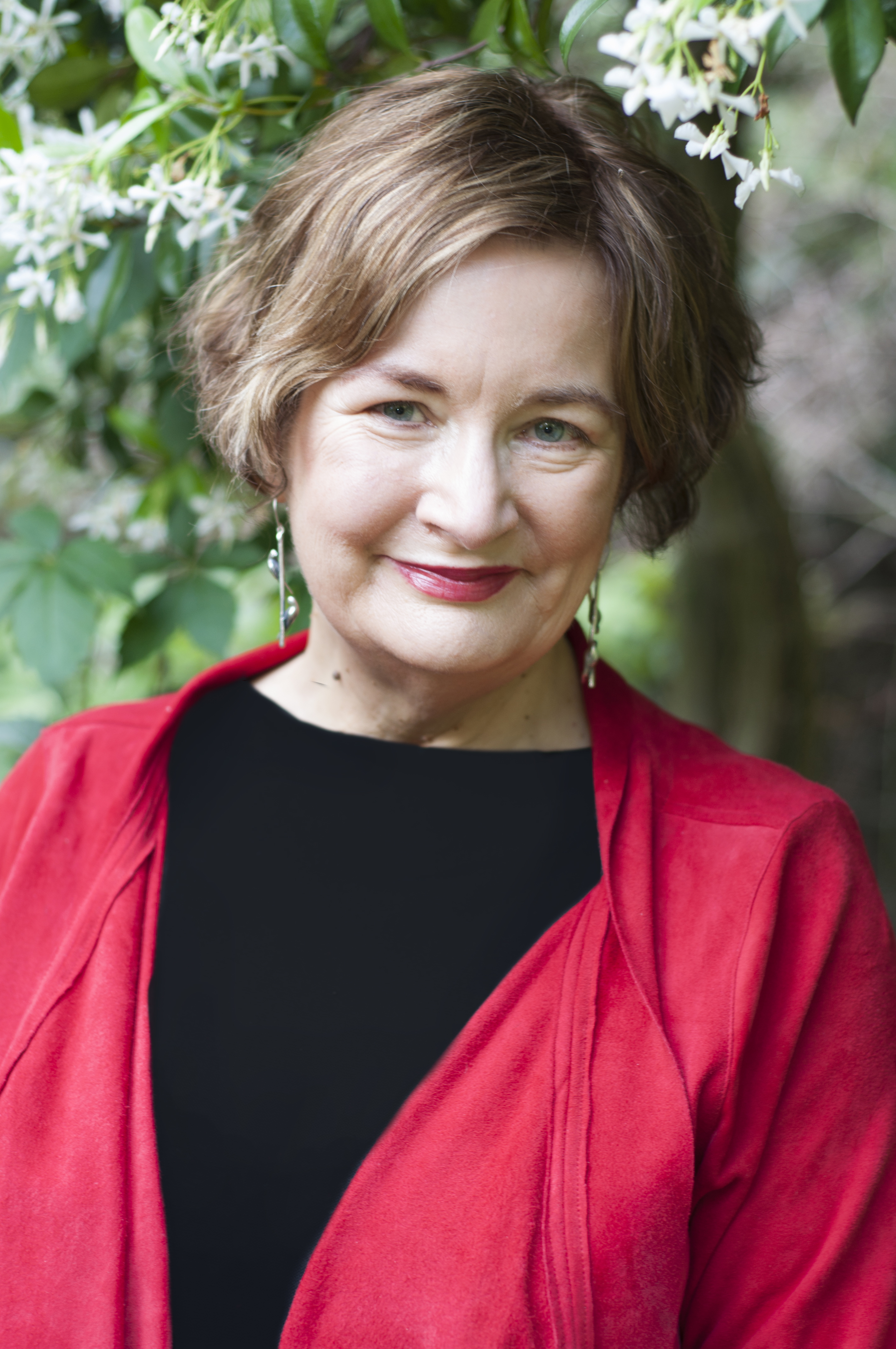
- Born: Anne French; 29 November 1953 (age 72); Sydney, New South Wales, Australia
- Education: Brisbane State High School
- Occupation: Author
- Spouse: Bryan Sullivan
- Partner: None
- Children: None
- Writing career
- Genres: Juvenile fiction, historical fiction, gardening books
- Notable works: Rain Stones; Somewhere Around the Corner; Hitler's Daughter; Diary of a Wombat; To the Moon and Back
- Website: www.jackiefrench.com

Jacqueline Anne French AM (née Ffrench, born 29 November 1953), known professionally as Jackie French, is an Australian author who has written across several genres for both adults and children. Her most notable works include Rain Stones, Diary of a Wombat, The Girl from Snowy River and Hitler's Daughter. Several of her books have been recommended for teaching the Australian Curriculum. French lives in Braidwood, New South Wales, with her second husband Bryan Sullivan.

== Early life ==
French was born Jacqueline Anne Ffrench in Sydney in 1953 and grew up in Brisbane. She attended Brisbane State High School. Her parents divorced in 1967, and when her mother changed her surname from Ffrench to French, Jackie also did so.

== Career ==
French began writing Rain Stones, her first book for children, when she was 30 years old, living in a shed and in need of money to register her car.

French's books include both fictional, factional and non-fictional accounts of Australian history including Nanberry: Black Brother White, Tom Appleby, A Day to Remember, A Waltz for Matilda, The Girl from Snowy River, The Road to Gundagai, The Night They Stormed Eureka and Flood and Fire and Let the Land Speak: A history of Australia - how the land created our nation. Her most recent works include To Love a Sunburnt Country and The Beach they called Gallipoli, Fire, and The Hairy-Nosed Wombats Find a New Home. French's royalties for that book are donated towards wombat preservation and research.

Her books Hitler's Daughter and Pete the Sheep were adapted for the stage by Monkey BAA Theatre Company. Hitler's Daughter toured Australia in 2012 and the United States in 2013. Pete the Sheep toured Australia in 2014.

She is a regular contributor to the Australian Women's Weekly and the Canberra Times. She also presented gardening segments on the long-running Australian TV series Burke's Backyard.

== Awards and recognition ==
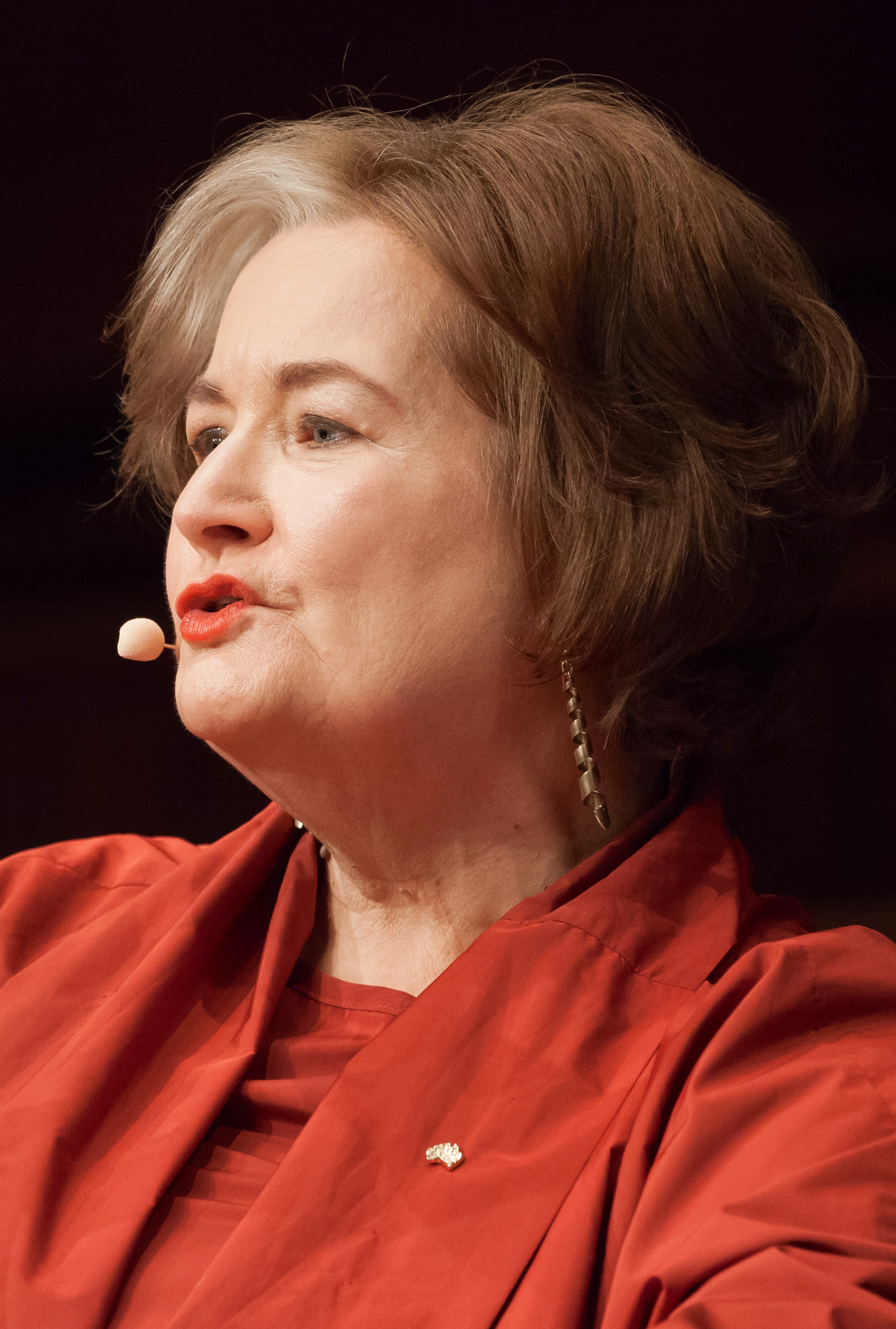
French speaking on an Australian Human Rights Commission panel discussion, in her capacity as 2015 Senior Australian of the Year.

French has won more than 60 awards in Australia and overseas and a number of her books have been shortlisted for numerous Australian and United States awards.

In 2014, she was awarded the Queensland Literary Awards Griffith University children's Book Award and the Children's Book Council of Australia Book of the Year Notable Award for Refuge, which was also shortlisted for the NSW Premier's History Award in two categories – Children's and Community Relations. Her book The Road to Gundagai was shortlisted for the NSW Premier's History Awards, and short-listed for the 2016 Ethel Turner Prize for Young People's Literature, New South Wales Premier's Literary Awards. Her novels Hitler's Daughter and To the Moon and Back have been awarded the CBCA Children's Book of the Year Award in 2000 and 2005, and Pennies for Hitler won the 2013 New South Wales Premier's Young People History Award. Hitler's Daughter also won the UK Wow! The award, a Semi Grant Prix Japan Award and is listed as a blue ribbon book in the US.

Diary of a Wombat, illustrated by Bruce Whatley, has been translated into 23 languages and is the only picture book to win the Australian Book Industry Award. It was also on The New York Times bestseller list. It has won the 2002 Booksellers Choice Award, Canberra's Own Outstanding List Award for Best Picture Book (2003), 2003 KOALA Awards, Best Picture Book, The Children Book Council of Australia Books I Love Best Yearly Award (2008), the 2003 ABA/AA Nielsen Book of the Year Award, 2003 American Library Association, Notable Book title, 2003 USA Cuffie Awards, Favourite Picture Book of the Year and Funniest Book, 2003, 2004 USA Benjamin Franklin Award, 2004 USA Lemmee Award, 2004 USA KIND Award and the 2007 Kids Reading Oz Choice Favourite Book Award.

French was the 2014-15 Australian Children's Laureate and was a finalist in the 2014 Nib Waverley Library Award for Literature. She was awarded the 2015 Senior Australian of the Year. In 2016, French was appointed a Member of the Order of Australia for significant service to literature as an author of children's books, and as an advocate for improved youth literacy. In 2016 she received the Australian Book Industry Awards Pixie O'Harris award.

== Personal life ==
In her early twenties she and her first husband moved to Araluen, near Braidwood, where she now lives with her second husband Bryan Sullivan. They have turned their property into a conservation refuge for the area's rare and endangered species.

In 1996, her sister Wendy vanished. She was presumed dead but her body was never found. In 2003, Wendy's husband died by suicide during an investigation into his wife's disappearance.

French studied the behaviour and ecology of wombats for 40 years and is the ambassador and former director of The Wombat Foundation, which raises funds for research into the preservation of wombats. She is also the ACT Children's Week Ambassador, 2011 Federal Literacy Ambassador, patron of Books for Kids, YESS, Speld ACT, Speld Qld, DAGS (Dyslexia Association Gawler), and joint patron of Monkey BAA Theatre for Young People with Susanne Gervais and Morris Gleitzman.

French is dyslexic and wrote I Spy a Great Reader to help teachers and parents teach dyslexic children to read using varied and new methods.
