= 2020 in Australian literature =

This is a list of historical events and publications of Australian literature during 2020.

== Major publications ==
=== Literary fiction ===
- Patrick Allington – Rise & Shine
- Robbie Arnott – The Rain Heron
- James Bradley – Ghost Species
- Trent Dalton – All Our Shimmering Skies
- Jon Doust – Return Ticket
- Chris Flynn – Mammoth
- Anna Goldsworthy – Melting Moments
- Kate Grenville – A Room Made of Leaves
- Gail Jones – Our Shadows
- Tom Keneally – The Dickens Boy
- Sofie Laguna – Infinite Splendours
- Bem Le Hunte – Elephants with Headlights
- Carol Lefevre – Murmurations
- S. L. Lim – Revenge
- Amanda Lohrey – The Labyrinth
- Laura Jean McKay – The Animals in That Country
- Andrew Pippos – Lucky's
- Mirandi Riwoe – Stone Sky Gold Mountain
- Madeleine Ryan – A Room Called Earth
- Philip Salom – The Fifth Season
- Ronnie Scott – The Adversary
- Jock Serong – The Burning Island
- Craig Silvey – Honeybee
- Nardi Simpson – Song of the Crocodile
- Madeleine Watts – The Inland Sea
- Gina Wilkinson – When the Apricots Bloom
- Pip Williams – The Dictionary of Lost Words
- Daniel Davis Wood – At the Edge of the Solid World
- Evie Wyld – The Bass Rock

=== Short stories ===
- Melissa Manning – Smokehouse

=== Children's and young adult fiction ===
- Davina Bell – The End of the World is Bigger than Love
- Alex Dyson – When It Drops
- Alison Evans – Euphoria Kids
- Zana Fraillon – The Lost Soul Atlas
- Jane Godwin – When Rain Turns to Snow
- Kate Gordon – Aster's Good, Right Things
- Libby Hathorn and Lisa Hathorn-Jarman – No! Never!
- Will Kostakis
  - Rebel Gods
  - The Greatest Hit
- Anna McGregor – Anemone Is Not The Enemy
- Cath Moore – Metal Fish, Falling Snow
- Jaclyn Moriarty – The Stolen Prince of Cloudburst
- Sally Murphy – Worse Things
- Katrina Nannestad – We Are Wolves
- Garth Nix – The Left-Handed Booksellers of London
- Kirli Saunders – Bindi
- Shaun Tan – Dog
- Jessica Townsend – Hollowpox: The Hunt for Morrigan Crow

=== Crime ===
- Anne Buist – The Long Shadow
- Garry Disher – Consolation
- Candice Fox – Gathering Dark
- Sulari Gentill – A Testament of Character
- Jane Harper – The Survivors
- Sally Hepworth – The Good Sister
- Dervla McTiernan – The Good Turn
- J. P. Pomare – Tell Me Lies
- Michael Robotham – When She Was Good
- Sarah Thornton – White Throat
- David Whish-Wilson – True West

=== Science Fiction and Fantasy ===
- Max Barry – Providence
- Trudi Canavan – Maker's Curse
- Greg Egan – Instantiation
- Dennis Glover – Factory 19
- Sam Hawke – Hollow Empire
- Gillian Polack – Poison & Light
- Paul Voermans – The White Library

=== Poetry ===
- Laurie Duggan – Homer Street
- Michael Farrell – Family Trees
- Kate Llewellyn – Harbour
- Felicity Plunkett – A Kinder Sea
- Ellen van Neerven
  - Homeland Calling: Words from a new generation of Aboriginal and Torres Strait Islander voices (as editor)
  - Throat

=== Non-fiction ===
- Julia Baird – Phosphorescence: On awe, wonder and things that sustain you when the world goes dark
- Richard Fidler – The Golden Maze: A History of Prague
- Michael Gawenda – The Powerbroker: Mark Leibler, an Australian Life
- Eddie Jaku – The Happiest Man on Earth
- John Kinsella – Displaced: A Rural Life
- Grace Karskens – People of the River: Lost worlds of early Australia
- Sophie McNeill – We Can't Say We Didn't Know: Dispatches from an age of impunity
- Brenda Niall – Friends and Rivals: Four Great Australian Writers: Barbara Baynton, Ethel Turner, Nettie Palmer, Henry Handel Richardson
- Caroline Overington – Missing William Tyrrell
- Christopher Pyne – The Insider: The scoops, the scandals and the serious business within the Canberra bubble
- Cassandra Pybus – Truganini: Journey Through the Apocalypse
- Miranda Tapsell – Top End Girl
- Robert Tickner – Ten Doors Down: The Story of an Extraordinary Adoption Reunion
- Malcolm Turnbull – A Bigger Picture

== Awards and honours ==
Note: these awards were presented in the year in question.

=== Lifetime achievement ===
Award	Author
Mona Brand Award	Kate Mulvany
Patrick White Award	Gregory Day

=== Literary ===
Award	Author	Title	Publisher
ALS Gold Medal	Charmaine Papertalk Green	Nganajungu Yagu	Cordite Press
Colin Roderick Award	Sally Young	Paper Emperors: The Rise of Australia’s Newspaper Empires	NewSouth Publishing
Indie Book Awards Book of the Year	Favel Parrett	There Was Still Love	Hachette
New South Wales Premier's Literary Awards	Tara June Winch	The Yield	Penguin Random House
Stella Prize	Jess Hill	See What You Made Me Do	Black Inc
Victorian Premier's Literary Awards	S. Shakthidharan, with Eamon Flack	Counting and Cracking	Belvoir and Co-Curious

=== Fiction ===
==== National ====
Award	Author	Title	Publisher
Adelaide Festival Awards for Literature	Jessica Townsend	Nevermoor: The Trials of Morrigan Crow	Hachette
ARA Historical Novel Prize	Mirandi Riwoe	Stone Sky Gold Mountain	University of Queensland Press
The Australian/Vogel Literary Award	K. M. Kruimink	A Treacherous Country	Allen & Unwin
Barbara Jefferis Award	Lucy Treloar	Wolfe Island	Pan Macmillan
Indie Book Awards Book of the Year – Fiction	Favel Parrett	There Was Still Love	Hachette
Indie Book Awards Book of the Year – Debut Fiction	Suzanne Daniel	Allegra in Three Parts	Pan Macmillan
Miles Franklin Literary Award	Tara June Winch	The Yield	Penguin Random House
Prime Minister's Literary Awards	Tara June Winch	The Yield	Penguin Random House
New South Wales Premier's Literary Awards	Tara June Winch	The Yield	Penguin Random House
Queensland Literary Awards	Mirandi Riwoe	Stone Sky Gold Mountain	University of Queensland Press
Victorian Premier's Literary Awards	Christos Tsiolkas	Damascus	Allen & Unwin
Voss Literary Prize	Tara June Winch	The Yield	Hamish Hamilton

=== Children and Young Adult ===
==== National ====
Award	Category	Author	Title	Publisher
Children's Book of the Year Award	Older Readers	Vikki Wakefield	This Is How We Change the Ending	Text Publishing
Children's Book of the Year Award	Younger Readers	Pip Harry	The Little Wave	University of Queensland Press
Children's Book of the Year Award	Picture Book	Chris McKimmie	I Need a Parrot	Ford Street
Children's Book of the Year Award	Early Childhood	Frances Watts	My Friend Fred	Allen & Unwin
Children's Book of the Year Award	Eve Pownall Award for Information Books	Bruce Pascoe	Young Dark Emu: A truer history	Magabala Books
Indie Book Awards Book of the Year	Children's	Sami Bayly	The Illustrated Encyclopaedia of Ugly Animals	Lothian
Indie Book Awards Book of the Year	Young Adult	Wal Chim	The Surprising Power of a Good Dumpling	Allen & Unwin
New South Wales Premier's Literary Awards	Children's	Lian Tanner & Jonathan Bentley	Ella and the Ocean	Allen & Unwin
New South Wales Premier's Literary Awards	Young People's	Karen Foxlee	Lenny's Book of Everything	Allen & Unwin
Victorian Premier's Literary Awards	Young Adult Fiction	Helena Fox	How It Feels to Float	Pan Macmillan Australia

=== Crime and Mystery ===
==== International ====
Award	Category	Author	Title	Publisher
Barry Award	Novel	Jane Harper	The Lost Man	Pan Macmillan
Crime Writers' Association Gold Dagger Award	Novel	Michael Robotham	Good Girl, Bad Girl	Hachette Australia

==== National ====
Award	Category	Author	Title	Publisher
Davitt Award	Novel	Meg Mundell	The Trespassers	University of Queensland Press
Davitt Award	Young adult novel	Astrid Scholte	Four Dead Queens	Allen & Unwin
Davitt Award	Children's novel	Jenny Blackford	The Girl in the Mirror	Eagle Books
Davitt Award	True crime	Adele Ferguson	Banking Bad: Whistleblowers. Corporate cover-ups. One Journalist's Fight for the Truth	HarperCollins
Davitt Award	Debut novel	Susan Hurley	Eight Lives	Affirm Press
Davitt Award	Readers' choice	Dervla McTiernan	The Scholar	HarperCollins
Davitt Award	Readers' choice	Emma Viskic	Darkness for Light	Echo Publishing
Ned Kelly Award	Novel	Christian White	The Wife and the Widow	Affirm Press
Ned Kelly Award	First novel	Natalie Conyer	Present Tense	Clan Destine Press
Ned Kelly Award	True crime	Dan Box	Bowraville	Viking Books

=== Science fiction ===
Award	Category	Author	Title	Publisher
Ditmar Award	Novel	Gillian Polack	The Year of the Fruit Cake	IFWG Publishing
Ditmar Award	Best Short Fiction	Rivqa Rafael	"Whom My Soul Loves"	

=== Poetry ===
Award	Author	Title	Publisher
Adelaide Festival Awards for Literature	Natalie Harkin	Archival-Poetics	Vagabond Press
Anne Elder Award (joint winners)	Cham Zhi Yi	blur by the	Subbed In
Anne Elder Award (joint winners)	Gareth Sion Jenkins	Recipes for the Disaster	Five Islands Press
Mary Gilmore Award	Thom Sullivan	Carte Blanche	Vagabond Press
Prime Minister's Literary Awards	Omar Sakr	The Lost Arabs	University of Queensland Press
New South Wales Premier's Literary Awards	Peter Boyle	Enfolded in the Wings of a Great Darkness	Vagabond Press
Queensland Literary Awards	П. O.	Heide	Giramondo Publishing
Victorian Premier's Literary Awards	Charmaine Papertalk Green	Nganajungu Yagu	Cordite

=== Drama ===
Award	Category	Author	Title	Publisher
New South Wales Premier's Literary Awards	Script	Kylie Boltin	Missing	
New South Wales Premier's Literary Awards	Script	Jacquelin Perske	The Cry, Episode 2	
New South Wales Premier's Literary Awards	Play	S. Shakthidharan, with Eamon Flack	Counting and Cracking	Belvoir
Victorian Premier's Literary Awards	Drama	S. Shakthidharan, with Eamon Flack	Counting and Cracking	Belvoir
Patrick White Playwrights' Award	Award	Ra Chapman	K-BOX	Malthouse Theatre
Patrick White Playwrights' Award	Fellowship	Angus Cerini		

=== Non-Fiction ===
Award	Category	Author	Title	Publisher
Adelaide Festival Awards for Literature	Non-Fiction	Meredith Lake	The Bible in Australia	NewSouth
Indie Book Awards Book of the Year	Non-Fiction	Archie Roach	Tell Me Why	Simon and Schuster Australia
Indie Book Awards Book of the Year	Illustrated Non-Fiction	Paul Byrnes	The Lost Boys	Affirm Press
National Biography Award	Biography	Patrick Mullins	Tiberius with a Telephone: The life and stories of William McMahon	Scribe Publications
New South Wales Premier's Literary Awards	Non-Fiction	Patrick Mullins	Tiberius with a Telephone: The Life and Stories of William McMahon	Scribe Publications
New South Wales Premier's History Awards	Australian History	James Dunk	Bedlam at Botany Bay	NewSouth Publishing
New South Wales Premier's History Awards	Community and Regional History	Callum Clayton-Dixon	Surviving New England: A History of Aboriginal Resistance and Resilience Through the First Forty Years of Colonial Apocalypse	Nēwara Aboriginal Corporation
New South Wales Premier's History Awards	General History	Kate Fullagar	The Warrior, the Voyager, and the Artist: Three Lives in an Age of Empire	Yale University Press
Queensland Literary Awards	Non-Fiction	Joe Gorman	Heartland: How Rugby League Explains Queensland	University of Queensland Press
Victorian Premier's Literary Awards	Non-Fiction	Christina Thompson	Sea People: The Puzzle of Polynesia	HarperCollins

== Deaths ==
- 1 January – Alexander Frater, travel writer and journalist (born 1937 in Vanuatu)
- 6 January – Timoshenko Aslanides, poet (born 1943)
- 20 January – Steph Bowe, young adult novelist and blogger (born 1994)
- 1 April – Bruce Dawe, poet (born 1930)
- 14 May – Judith Clarke, writer for children and teenagers (born 1943)
- 5 June – Andrew Riemer, literary critic and author (born 1936)
- 10 June – Jesse Blackadder, novelist, screenwriter and journalist (born 1964)
- 7 July – Elizabeth Harrower, novelist (born 1928)
- 10 September – Barbara Ker Wilson, English-born Australian editor and novelist (born 1929)
- 29 September – Ania Walwicz, poet, playwright, prose writer and visual artist (born 1951 in Poland)
- 6 November – Gerald Stone, journalist (born 1933 in USA)
- 14 November – Greg Growden, sports journalist, author and biographer (born 1959/60)
- 9 December – Mungo MacCallum, political journalist and commentator (born 1941)
- 12 December – Wendy Brennan, romantic fiction writer (co-wrote with husband Frank Brennan as Emma Darcy) (born 1940)

== See also ==
- 2020 in Australia
- 2020 in literature
- 2020 in poetry
- List of years in Australian literature
- List of years in literature
- List of Australian literary awards
