= Daniel Wood =

Daniel Wood, Dan Wood or Danny Wood may refer to:

- Dan Wood (soccer) (1946–2020), collegiate and professional soccer coach, and professional golfer
- Dan Wood (broadcaster), British broadcaster, DJ, podcaster and video producer
- Dan Wood (ice hockey) (born 1962), Canadian former ice hockey player
- Daniel Davis Wood (born 1983), Australian novelist
- Daniel Joseph Wood (1849–1919), organist and chorister
- Daniel P. Wood (1819–1891), New York politician
- Danny Wood (born 1969), American musician and actor, member of New Kids on the Block
- Danny Wood, American musician, former member of ...And You Will Know Us by the Trail of Dead
- Daniel Wood (Mormon pioneer) (1800–1892), pioneer and member of the Church of Jesus Christ of Latter-day Saints (LDS Church)
- Daniel Wood (entrepreneur), American inventor

== See also ==
- Daniel Woods (born 1989), American rock climber
