= The Good Turn =

2020 crime novel by Dervla McTiernan

- Author: Dervla McTiernan
- Language: English
- Series: Cormac Reilly
- Genre: Crime novel
- Publisher: HarperCollins
- Publication date: 1 March 2020
- Publication place: Australia
- Media type: Print
- Pages: 384
- Awards: Barry Award — Best Paperback Original, winner 2022
- ISBN: 9781460756799
- Preceded by: The Scholar
- Followed by: The Unquiet Grave

The Good Turn is a 2020 crime novel by Irish-Australian author Dervla McTiernan. It was originally published in Australia by HarperCollins.

It is the third installment in the author's Cormac Reilly series of novels, following The Rúin and The Scholar, and preceding The Unquiet Grave.

It was the winner of the Best Paperback Original Barry Award in 2022.

== Synopsis ==
After Cormac Reilly allows Garda Peter Fisher to take the lead in an investigation, Fisher shoots a suspect and he is sent home in disgrace to the village of Roundstone to work under his estranged father. There he is tasked with closing off a case of a double murder but starts to suspect that all is not as it should be with the case and that the real perpetrator might still be at large.

== Critical reception ==
In The Newtown Review of Books Karen Chisholm noted the "effortless yarn-spinning" of all the books in this series. She continued: "It doesn't ever let go of the fundamentals of a police procedural, with crimes being investigated, stories being assessed and guilty parties identified, but it does that with brilliant characterisation and elegant descriptions of place, behaviour and atmosphere."

Reviewing the novel for Australian Book Review Kirsten Tranter commented: "McTiernan's writing has the polish and pace of top-shelf crime fiction, but her work is made exceptional by the way she veers from the scripts that define the genre, along with her thoughtful attention to quotidian details of character and place...How, McTiernan asks, does a good cop manage to be a good cop in this world, this environment constrained by pinched resources, the constant shadow of corruption, the drag of indifference, the limits of the system even when it works as it is intended?"

== Awards ==
- 2021 Ned Kelly Awards — Best Novel, shortlisted
- 2021 Davitt Award — Best Adult Crime Novel, longlisted
- 2021 Australian Book Industry Awards (ABIA) — Australian General Fiction Book of the Year, shortlisted
- 2021 Indie Book Awards Book of the Year – Fiction, longlisted
- 2022 Barry Award, Best Paperback Original, winner

== See also ==
- 2020 in Australian literature
