= C12orf42 =

Protein-coding gene in humans

Identifiers
- Aliases: C12orf42, chromosome 12 open reading frame 42
- External IDs: MGI: 1923890; GeneCards: C12orf42

Gene location (Human)
Chr.	Chromosome 12 (human)
Band	12q23.2-q23.3	Start	103,237,591 bp
Band	12q23.2-q23.3	End	103,495,978 bp
RNA expression pattern
Bgee	Human / Mouse (ortholog); Top expressed in: sperm; left testis; right testis; testicle; gonad; spleen; lymph node; granulocyte; appendix; blood / n/a; More reference expression data
BioGPS	n/a
Orthologs
Databases	NCBI: entry; OMA: entry
Species	Human	Mouse
Entrez	374470	76640
Ensembl	ENSG00000179088	n/a
UniProt	Q96LP6	n/a
RefSeq (mRNA)	NM_001099336; NM_001278419; NM_001278420; NM_198521; NM_001386867 NM_001386868; NM_001386869; NM_001386871; NM_001386872	NM_029685
RefSeq (protein)	NP_001092806; NP_001265348; NP_001265349; NP_940923	n/a
Location (UCSC)	Chr 12: 103.24 – 103.5 Mb	n/a
PubMed search
- Wikidata
View/Edit Human	View/Edit Mouse

Chromosome 12 Open Reading Frame 42 (C12orf42) is a protein-encoding gene in Homo sapiens.

== Gene ==
=== Locus ===
The genomic location for this gene is as follows: starts at 103,237,591 bp and ends 103,496,010 bp. The cytogenetic location for C12orf42 is 12q23.2. It is located on the negative strand

Cytogenetic band: 12q23.2

== mRNA ==
Fifteen different mRNAs are made by transcription: fourteen alternative splice variants and one unspliced form.

== Protein ==
Tertiary structure for C12orf42 protein.

The protein released by this gene is known as uncharacterized protein C12orf42. There are three isoforms for this protein produced by alternative splicing. The first isoform is a conical sequence. The second Isoform differs from the first in that it doesn't contain 1-95 aa in its sequence. The third isoform differs from the conical sequence in two ways:

- 87-107 aa is the sequence GSHHGQATQKLQGAMVLHLEE instead of VFPERTQNSMACKRLLHTCQY
- the entire sequence 108-360 aa doesn't exist in this isoform

=== Secondary structure ===
C12orf42 protein takes on several secondary structures, such as: alpha helices, beta sheets, and random coils. C12orf42 protein is a soluble. Proteins that are soluble have a hydrophilic outside and hydrophobic interior . Proteins with this type of structure are able to freely float inside a cell, due to the liquid composition of the cytosol.

=== Subcellular location ===
C12orf42 is an intracellular protein. This is known by the lack of transmembrane domains or signal peptides. This suggests that it is predicted to be a nuclear protein, given the nuclear localization signal (NSL) found: PRDRRPQ at 292 aa and a bipartite KRLIKVCSSAPPRPTRR at 325 aa.

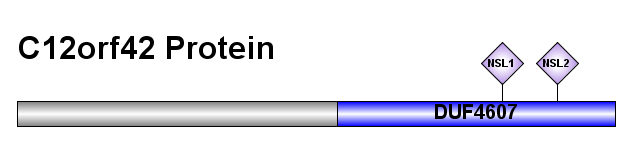
This protein cartoon illustrates the location of, the domain DUF4607 and two nuclear localization sequences.

=== Post-translation modification ===
Predicted post-translation modification sites are seen below in the table. Nuclear proteins are known for having phosphorylation, acetylation, sumoylation, and O-GlcNAc as types of modifications:

- Phosphorylation affects proteins-protein interaction and the stability of the protein.
- Acetylation promotes protein folding and improves stability.
- Sumoylation is involved in nuclear-cytosolic transport and DNA repair.
- Glycosylation (known as O-GlcNAc while in the nucleus) promotes protein folding and stability.

Type of Modification	Amino Acid Position
Phosphorylation	Ser44,Ser47,Ser58,Ser74,Ser113,Ser115,Ser118,Ser123,Ser130,Ser134,Ser135,Ser205,Ser210,Ser217, Ser226,Ser238, Ser302,Thr17,Thr45,Thr145,Thr150,Thr228, Thr240,Thr240,Thr291,Thr339,Thr344,Tyr124
Acetylation	Ser2
Sumoylation	IPIVS32-36
O-GlcNAc	Thr45,Ser58,Ser130,Ser135,Ser205,Ser210, Ser217,Thr339

== Expression ==
=== Tissue profiles ===
Microarray data shows expression of the C12orf42 gene in different tissues throughout the human body. There is high expression in the lymph node, spleen, and thymus. There is significant expression in the brain, bladder, epididymis, and the helper T cell. Therefore, there is statistically significant expression of C12orf42 gene throughout the nervous system, immune system, and male reproductive system.

=== In situ hybridization ===
The table below shows the areas in the mouse brain where C12orf42 is expressed. The gene name for the mouse is 1700113H08Rik, it is the human homolog of C12orf42. Area one and two of the brain manages body and skeletal movement. Areas three and four in the brain are for sensory functions; area four specializes in perception of smell. Area five in the brain functions in emotional learning and memory.

Location in mouse brain	Area in Brain
Area #1	Crus 1, granular layer
Area #1	Crus 2, granular layer
Area #1	Paramedian lobule, molecular
Area #2	Paraflocculus, granular layer
Area #2	Flocculus, granular layer
Area #3	Field CA1, pyramidal layer
Area #3	Field CA2, pyramidal layer
Area #3	Field CA3, pyramidal layer
Area #4	Piriform area, pyramidal layer
Area #4	Piriform-amygdalar area, pyramidal layer
Area #5	Cortical amygdalar area, posterior part, lateral zone, layer 2
Area #5	Cortical amygdalar area, posterior part, Imedial zone, layer 2

== Homology ==
=== Paralog ===
C12orf42 gene has only one other member in its gene family, this gene is known as Neuroligin 4, Y linked gene (NLGN4Y).

=== Orthologs ===
C12orf42 orthologs are mostly mammals. One exception that was found is the Pelodiscus Sinensis or more commonly known as the Chinese soft-shell turtle.

==== Conserved domain structure ====
The domain structure that is most important is DUF4607, it is conserved in the Eutheria clade in the Mammalia class. The order that it is conserved in is as follows: Artiodactyla, Carnivora, Chiroptera, Lagomorpha, Perissodactyla, Primates, Proboscidea, and Rodentia.

Mammalia Class	genus	species	common name	Date of divergence	accession #	seq length	seq ident	seq similar	Taxa/Paralog
1	Homo	H.Sapiens	Human	---------------	NP_001157710	256aa	89.80%	*****	Paralog
2	Papio	P.Anubis	Olive Baboon	27.3 mya	XP_009179812	353aa	90%	93%	Order Primate
3	Ovis	O. Aries	Sheep	95.0 mya	XP_012026728	177aa	64.00%	68%	Order Artiodactyla
4	Oryctolagus	O. Cuniculus	European Rabbit	90.1 mya	XP_008255213	346aa	61%	70%	Order Lagomorpha
5	Equus	E. Caballus	Horse	95.0 mya	XP_005606608	293aa	60%	68%	Order Perissodactyla
6	Orcinus	O. Orca	Killer Whale	95.0 mya	XP_012388341.1	322aa	59%	67%	Order Cetacea
7	Galeopterus	G.Variegatus	Sunda flying lemur	83.0 mya	XP_008574769.1	289aa	56%	64%	Order Dermoptera
8	Trichechus	T.Manatus	West Indian Manatee	102.0 mya	XP_012410246	348aa	55%	63%	Order Sirenia
9	Loxodonta	L. Africana	African bush elephant	102.0 mya	XP_010599824	288aa	54%	62%	Order Proboscidea
10	Pteropus	P.Alecto	Black flying fox	95.0 mya	ELK10322.1	300aa	52%	64%	Order Chiroptera
11	Condylura	c.Cristata	Star-nose mole	95.0 mya	XP_004676538.1	306aa	52%	64%	Order Insectivora
12	Ailuropoda	A. Melanoleuca	Giant Panda	95.0 mya	XP_011218367.1	305aa	51%	61%	Order Carnivora
13	orycteropus	O. Afer	Aardvarks	102.0 mya	XP_007950592	283aa	49%	59%	Order Tubulidentata
14	Elephantulus	E. Edwardii	Cape Elephant Shrew	102.0 mya	XP_006888639	114aa	47%	60%	Order Macroscelidea
15	Mus	M. Musculus	Mouse	90.1 mya	NP_083961	327aa	45%	57%	Order Rodentia
16	Canis	C. Lupus	Dog	95.0 mya	XP_013974742	206aa	44%	56%	Order Carnivora
17	Dasypus	D. Novemcinctus	Nine-banded armadillo	102.0 mya	XP_012377498	360aa	41%	49%	Order Edentata
Reptillia Class	genus	species	common name	Date of divergence	accession #	seq length	seq ident	seq similar	NOTES
1	Pelodiscus	P. Sinensis	Chinese Soft-Shell Turtle	320.5 mya	XP_014436518	618aa	32%	42%	Order Testudines

== Clinical significance ==
In an experiment, fine-tiling comparative genomic hybridization (FT-CGH) and ligation-mediated PCR (LM-PCR) were combined. This resulted in the finding of a chromosomal translocation t(12;14)(q23;q11.2) in T-lymphoblastic lymphoma (T-LBL). The chromosomal translocation occurs during T-receptor delta gene-deleting rearrangement, which is important in T-cell differentiation. This translocation disrupts C12orf42 and it brings the gene ASCL1 closer to the T-cell receptor alpha (TRA) enhancer. As a result, the cross-fused gene encodes vital transcription factors that are found in medullary thyroid cancer and small-cell lung cancer.

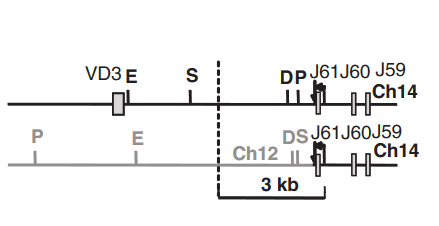
Illustrates the translocation that occurred that led to a deletion in chromosome 12. Where chromosome 12q23 cross-fused with TRDREC and TRAJ61 segment. This interfered with C12orf42 gene.
