= When the Apricots Bloom =

Novel by Australian author Gina Wilkinson

- Author: Gina Wilkinson
- Language: English
- Genre: Historical fiction
- Publisher: Hachette Australia
- Publication date: 29 December 2020
- Publication place: Australia
- Media type: Paperback
- Pages: 384
- ISBN: 9780733646409

When the Apricots Bloom is a 2020 historical fiction novel by Gina Wilkinson, based on her time spent as a foreign correspondent in Iraq.

== Synopsis ==
On the precipice of the United States' invasion of Iraq in 2002, the Iraqi secret police ramp up inspection. In this patriarchal society, they force Huda, a young woman working in the Australian embassy, to befriend and spy on Ally, the young American wife of the Australian ambassador, threatening her son if she disobeys. Ally's late mother worked in Iraq in the 1980s, and she wants to find out more about that time. Huda is conflicted about reporting on Ally to the secret police, and wants to protect her son even from threats, so she calls on her best friend, artist Rania, to help her procure a passport for him to leave. Rania also plans to send her children away, but is stuck being forced to paint a portrait of leader Saddam Hussein.

== Development ==
Gina Wilkinson was a foreign correspondent in Iraq for over a year in the early 2000s, under the rule of Saddam Hussein.

== Reception ==
For The Sydney Morning Herald, Jessie Tu praised the book's fresh perspective on war storytelling, and said that "Wilkinson's evocative language shapes the novel into one of suspense, intrigue and conspiracy".

Kim Reardon of Coast Community News said it is "a wonderful book with strong characters". It was featured as one of "Martin's Must Reads" on KRCU in the US.

== Title ==
The book's name When the Apricots Bloom is an Egyptian idiom that has a similar meaning to the English expression When Pigs Fly.

== See also ==
- 2020 in Australian literature
