= What Happened to Nina? =

2024 novel by Dervla McTiernan

- Author: Dervla McTiernan
- Language: English
- Genre: Thriller
- Publisher: HarperCollins
- Publication date: 6 March 2024
- Pages: 352pp
- ISBN: 9781460760147

What Happened to Nina? is a 2024 thriller novel by Irish author Dervla McTiernan.

== Plot ==
Nina and Simon, a young couple, leave for a weekend at Simon's family cabin in Vermont, but only Simon comes home.

== Critical reception ==
A reviewer for Kirkus Reviews noted: "McTiernan turns the traditional thriller on its head by exploring the why and the what over the who. There isn't a lot of mystery here, but there is deep humanity; it's a meditation on grief, and helplessness, and what it means to parent a child who might not live the life you thought they would–or might not be the person you want them to be–and how death removes from each of us the illusion of choice or control over past, present, or future. And that is truly haunting."

Sarah Reida, writing for the Crime Spree magazine was impressed with the novel: "What Happened to Nina by Dervla McTiernan is the best book I've read this year. It's engrossing from start to finish, playing out two scenarios, either of which could be construed as a parent's worst nightmare, and leading to an ending that made me sit and think for quite a while...This book is of a indeterminate genre. It had me on the edge of my seat–I finished it in three days–but it's not truly a thriller, or a mystery. We know exactly what happened to Nina, and we're watching how the events unfold towards the end of closure and/or discovery. It is a thriller in the sense that we race to the end, wanting closure and wanting justice, but this book is more character-driven."
