= Nevermoor: The Trials of Morrigan Crow =

2017 novel by Jessica Townsend

Nevermoor
- First edition (Australia)
- Author: Jessica Townsend
- Cover artist: Jim Madsen
- Language: English
- Series: The Nevermoor series
- Genre: Fantasy
- Publisher: Hachette Australia
- Publication date: October 10, 2017 (Australia); October 31, 2017 (United States)
- Publication place: Australia
- Media type: Print (Paperback and Hardback)
- Pages: 461
- Awards: Book of the Year Award (Australian Book Industry Awards; Best Overall Published Work (Adelaide festival Awards for Literature); Children's Award (Adelaide festival Awards for Literature)
- Followed by: Wundersmith: The Calling of Morrigan Crow

Nevermoor: The Trials of Morrigan Crow is a novel by Jessica Townsend and published by Little, Brown and Company. It was released October 10, 2017 in Australia and October 31, 2017 in the United States. The plot follows the titular character Morrigan Crow, who is cursed to die because she was born on an unlucky day. The book is followed by three sequels so far. Since the release of the first book in The Nevermoor series, the stories have also been released as audiobooks, in both CD and online audio formats. In English-speaking countries, the audiobooks are narrated by Gemma Whelan. Included in the back of the book is a deleted scene entitled Holt, Holt & Davie. The book is 461 pages long.

== Setting ==
The book is set mostly in two locations: Jackalfax, Morrigan's hometown which she leaves in the beginning of the novel, and Nevermoor, the titular city filled with fantastical creatures. A resident of Nevermoor is a Nevermoorian. Nevermoor is divided into 27 boroughs, most of which are divided into quadrants. According to the book, Nevermoorian children learn the names of the boroughs and quadrants like the ABCs in nursery school. Residents in Nevermoor are either human, also known as unnimals, or wunimals, who are a mix of human and another animal, either a wunimal major or minor.

== Characters ==
- Morrigan Odelle Crow: a young girl who was cursed just for being born on Eventide in the city of Jackalfax. Morrigan is said to die on the next Eventide day in exactly 12 years, but when the time comes for her to die, she is saved by Jupiter North and brought to Nevermoor. He helps her escape the Hunt of Smoke and Shadow, the group that kills cursed children on Eventide, by bringing her to Nevermoor. He enters her as his candidate in the Wundrous Society trials. At the end of the book, Morrigan is revealed to be a Wundersmith, a magician who can control the substance of Wunder, like Ezra Squall who is another Wundersmith like her that has the ability to control her power. Being a Wundersmith is the reason why Jupiter picked her, as it is her Knack.
- Jupiter North: a mysterious, yet playful man who saves Morrigan Crow so she can be his patron in the contest to determine the next group of Wundrous Society members. Jupiter also runs the Hotel Deucalion, the most famous hotel in Nevermoor. He is a Witness, meaning he can see the truth and past in all objects. In the Novel Jupiter takes on a role as a father figure to Morrigan.
- Hawthorne Swift: a friend of Morrigan and fellow contestant of the trial who also makes it into the Wondrous Society. Hawthorne grows close to Morrigan throughout the series, and they visit each other's houses a lot. Hawthorne's knack is dragon riding, and he is also a talented troublemaker.
- Jack Arjuna Korrapati: Jupiter's half-blind nephew who isn't very fond of Morrigan until the end of the book. Morrigan realizes that he can, in fact, see perfectly, and the eye patch he wears covers the eye that gives him his knack, Witness, which lets him see the truth in all things just like Jupiter, who he refers to as Uncle Jove.
- Inspector Flintlock: an inspector who is constantly trying to get Morrigan deported. His suspicions are put to rest by Cadence Blackburn's mesmerizing.
- Ezra Squall / Mr. Jones: A Wundersmith who massacred a group of heroes in Nevermoor 100 years ago in Courage Square and was banished from Nevermoor afterwards. Though the Nevermoorian police and military have forcefully banned Squall from the city, he is able to communicate with those inside noncorporeally through the Gossamer. He poses as his own assistant, Mr. Jones, to get close to Morrigan, and continues to see her through the Gossamer in the succeeding books after his true identity is revealed.
- Fenestra: a giant talking cat, called a Magnificat, who is the head of housekeeping at the Hotel Deucalion. Fenestra is ridden by Morrigan as a steed in the Chase Trial.
- Noelle Devereaux: one of Baz Charlton's candidates who is mean to Morrigan. Noelle is a competitor in the Wundrous Society with a knack for singing, however she does not make it in.
- Cadence Blackburn: a mesmerist who keeps appearing in Morrigan's life. She encounters Cadence once at the Chase Trial, and saves her even though she steals Morrigan's chance at a dinner with the elders, and then again at the Fright Trial. Cadence is never remembered by those around her, being a mesmerist, and until the other members of Unit 919 get used to it, Morrigan is the only one who is immune, and the two become friends.
- Corvus Crow: Morrigan Crow's father who is mean to her due to her curse. He considers her an embarrassment and an annoyance on his political career.

== Plot ==
Having been born on Eventide eleven years ago, Morrigan Crow is considered "cursed" and is blamed for all the misfortune brought upon the people of Jackalfax, such as a broken hip or a dead cat. In addition, Morrigan is supposed to die in one year on the next Eventide, so she doesn't give it much thought when she is not chosen as anyone's apprentice when it is time for the masters to choose. However, this year, Eventide will come a full year early, as Morrigan is surprised to learn from her father, Corvus Crow. This means that Morrigan is set to die even sooner than she thought. When Eventide night comes, Morrigan is whisked away by Jupiter North, who had apparently, been lingering around Jackalfax recently. North saves her from the Hunt of Smoke and Shadow, who hunt cursed children on Eventide, and takes her to Nevermoor, a mysterious magic town the likes of which Morrigan has never seen on any map. North brings Morrigan to his home and business, the Hotel Deucalion, which he owns and introduces her to the employees, including Kedgeree Burns, the concierge, and Fenestra, a giant talking cat who is head of housekeeping. There, Morrigan learns from Dame Chanda Kali, a singer and permanent resident of the hotel, that North plans to insert Morrigan into a contest to gain access and membership to the Wundrous Society, a mystical society of elders of which Kali is a part of. Kali also tells her that to be a part of the society, one must have a "knack," or a special power. Kali's, for example, is that she can attract and control animals with her voice. Morrigan begins to worry, since her apparent knack has not revealed itself yet.

Morrigan later confronts Jupiter, demanding to know what her knack is, if she even has one. Jupiter tells her that it isn't important, in addition to describing the four trials she will have to complete to become a member of the Wundrous Society: the Book Trial, the Chase Trial, the Fright Trial, and the Show Trial. Morrigan becomes concerned that her not having a knack will disqualify her from the competition, but Jupiter assures her that everything will be fine. Jupiter also reveals his own knack, called "The Witness," which lets him see the truth in everything. Later, Jupiter and Morrigan (who he calls "Mog") visit the Wundrous Society campus, Wunsoc, a portmanteau of both words, by way of the Brolly Rail, a train that never stops to let passengers on, so those who wish to ride it must jump onto it while it is still speeding along. During the first trial, the Book Trial, Morrigan aces the first part, though she must admit that she feels alone, and barely passes the second half, which is all about Nevermoorian history. As Morrigan prepares for the next trial, the Chase Trial, Jupiter and the staff of the hotel try to pick out a stead on which Morrigan can race on. At the same time, Morrigan develops a close friendship with fellow competitor Hawthorne Swift, a dragon-rider, and an intense hatred for Noelle, another competitor who enjoys mocking and making fun of her.

In the Chase Trial, contestants must race on a non-flying creature with two to four legs and hit a target all the way across town. Out of three hundred contestants, there are only 150 targets, five of which are golden targets, and, if you hit them, you will be invited to a dinner party hosted by the council itself, which is said to give contestants an advantage in the coming trials. Morrigan, riding Fenestra, attempts to hit a golden target, but must stop along the way to pick up another girl who fell off her rhinoceros and almost got trampled. The girl, Cadence, takes victory from her, and Morrigan only passes the trial through a technicality. After the Fright Trial, Morrigan prepares for the Show Trial. Hawthorne, Noelle, and Cadence get a spot in the top nine contestants, but when Morrigan gets up on the stage, she still has not realized her knack. Jupiter tells the judges something, and they accept her. Later, while riding home, Morrigan is kidnapped by Ezra Squall, the Wundersmith, the man who massacred Nevermoor a hundred years ago, and he tells her that she is a Wundersmith too. All the kids who were born on Eventide in Jackalfax are, and he hired the Hunt of Smoke and Shadow to kill them.

== Reception ==
=== Reviews ===
The Guardian called the book "a magical debut" and that "from the surreal Hotel Deucalion to giant Magnifi-cats and the Tube-inspired Wunderground transport system, Townsend’s vibrant world-building is what really sets Nevermoor apart." On The Terror of Knowing, a review rated the book five out of five stars, calling the main character Morrigan Crow "a wonderful protagonist for the story ... strong and sarcastic and also silly at times." A review on Publishers Weekly also likened to the Morrigan character, calling her a "captivating heroine, filled with moxie and wit, whose unexpected second chance at life gives her the opportunity to discover who she truly is." A Cat, a Book, and a Cup of Tea gave the book four out of five cats, saying that though "there is darkness in this book, notably in Morrigan’s realizations about her family ... somehow Nevermoor manages to stay light-hearted and zany." The book has also been reviewed by The Nerd Daily.

=== Awards ===
This book won the Book of the Year Award at the Australian Book Industry Awards. In addition, at the Adelaide Festival Awards for Literature, the Premier's Award for best overall published work and the Children's Award were both awarded to Nevermoor: The Trials of Morrigan Crow.

== Adaptations ==
=== Film ===
In November 2016, a film adaptation of Nevermoor: The Trials of Morrigan Crow was announced, with screenwriter Drew Goddard writing and producing the movie by October of the next year for 20th Century Fox. By April 2022, Paramount Pictures had acquired the rights to the film adaptation, with it being made as a musical. Goddard is still on board as writer and producer. The Greatest Showman director, Michael Gracey will direct the film and create original music.

=== Audiobook ===
An audiobook adaptation of the novel, read by actress Gemma Whelan, was produced and released in 2017.

== Sequels ==
A year later, on November 13, 2018 (October 30, 2018 in Australia and the United Kingdom), a second installment in the Nevermoor series was released, titled Wundersmith: The Calling of Morrigan Crow. On October 27, 2020, Hollowpox: The Hunt for Morrigan Crow was released into bookstores, and a fourth novel, Silverborn: The Mystery of Morrigan Crow, was published on April 30, 2025.
