= The Nevermoor series =

Book series by Jessica Townsend

The Nevermoor Series
- Nevermoor: The Trials of Morrigan Crow (2017); Wundersmith: The Calling of Morrigan Crow (2018); Hollowpox: The Hunt for Morrigan Crow (2020); Silverborn: The Mystery of Morrigan Crow (2025)
- Author: Jessica Townsend
- Cover artist: Beatriz Castro, Jim Madsen
- Country: Australia
- Language: English
- Genre: Fantasy, children's literature
- Publisher: Little, Brown
- Published: October 10, 2017 – present
- Media type: Paperback; Hardcover
- No. of books: 4

The Nevermoor Series is a fantasy children's book series written by Australian author Jessica Townsend.

== Premise ==
The series centres around Morrigan Crow, a cursed child living in the Wintersea Republic fated to die on the last day of the year, Eventide. When it comes time for her to die on Eventide day, she is saved by Jupiter North and taken to the city of Nevermoor, where Jupiter is a hotel owner and member of the Wundrous Society, a prestigious institution where each member has a "knack", a supernatural ability that allows them to be better than average.

== Publication ==
Nevermoor: The Trials of Morrigan Crow was published by Little, Brown and Company on October 10, 2017, in Australia and October 31, 2017, in the United States, with cover art by Jim Madsen. The next book, Wundersmith: The Calling of Morrigan Crow, was released on October 30 and November 13, 2018, in Australia and the U.S., respectively. After a delayed late 2019, and later early 2020 release date, Hollowpox: The Hunt for Morrigan Crow was published on September 29, 2020, in Australia, October 15, 2020, in the United Kingdom, and October 27, 2020, in the United States. All three existing books in the series have been adapted into audiobook format, read by Gemma Whelan. The fourth book, Silverborn: The Mystery of Morrigan Crow, originally supposed to be released in late 2022, was delayed multiple times, and eventually published in Australia on April 30, 2025.

== Reception ==
The series has received positive reviews for plot, character development, and themes. Kirkus Reviews said of the first installment in the series, "[it's] not genre-shattering but a solid read for genre fans."

In 2017, film rights to Nevermoor: The Trials of Morrigan Crow were sold to 20th Century Fox, with Drew Goddard set to produce the movie and write the screenplay. The film later moved to Paramount Pictures with Michael Gracey attached to direct.

== Setting ==
The series is set in the city of Jackalfax, in the Wintersea Republic, and the titular city of Nevermoor, in the Free State. Jackalfax, where Morrigan was born and grew up in her childhood home Crow Manor, was founded sometime in the ninth age of the Wintersea Republic, as remarked by Morrigan early in the series. The streets and neighbourhood of the city are neat and orderly, with houses that all look similar and prestigious schools. Nevermoor itself is divided into 27 boroughs, which are further divided into quadrants. In addition to humans and animals, Nevermoor contains Wunimals, which are part animal (called "unnimals" in universe) and part human. Locations in Nevermoor include Proudfoot House, part of the Wunsoc campus where the Elders and the three schools reside; the Hotel Deucalion, the famously successful hotel in which Jupiter, Morrigan, and several others live; the Nevermoorian Opera House, a theatre in which both Dame Chanda Kali and the Angel Israfel have performed; and the Trollosseum, a sports arena used multiple times for different purposes across the series.

Nevermoor contains three law-enforcement forces: the regular police force, colloquially known as "The Stink," the Wundrous Society Investigate Department, which is known as "The Stealth," and the "Silk," the Silver District police. Celebrations throughout the year include Hallowmas and Christmas, and, every Friday in the summer, a festive market called the Nevermoor Bazaar. Two prominent hospitals exist in Nevermoor, the Wundrous Society Teaching Hospital and the Royal Lightwing Hospital. Nevermoor is also home to many "geographic oddities," including Swindleroads, Tricksy Lanes, and Shadowstreets. The River Juro runs through Nevermoor and freezes over during the winter. The Wunderground is a public transportation system running underground and is powered by Wunder, and the Brolly Rail is a Wundrous mode of transportation that requires umbrellas to use and is dangerous.

In Nevermoor, citizens have come to hate Wundersmiths. A century ago Wundersmiths were known to create great things. Examples include a skyscraper made out of water and an amusement park only available to children in one of the poorest Nevermoor boroughs.Aafter a Wundersmith named Ezra Squall killed the other Wundersmiths in an event called the Courage Square Massacre, he was banished from Nevermoor and Wundersmiths became anathema. Morrigan, a Wundersmith herself, escapes Ezra Squall's Hunt of Smoke and Shadow into Nevermoor. However, it is revealed that Squall never intended to kill her, and intends for Morrigan to become his apprentice and heir.

== Series overview ==
=== Nevermoor ===
Ten-year-old Morrigan Crow is believed by her home-town community of Jackalfax in the Wintersea Republic to be 'cursed' and thus set to die at midnight on Eventide (the book's equivalent of New Year's Day). On the night Morrigan is said to die, Jupiter North, a member of the Wundrous Society, rescues her from the Hunt of Smoke and Shadow, the real source of the supposed curse, and brings her to the magical city of Nevermoor in the Free State. In order to become a citizen of Nevermoor and avoid deportation back to Jackalfax, Morrigan enters a series of Trials (The Book Trial, The Chase Trial, The Fright Trial and The Show Trial) in order to join Unit 919, the newest Unit of the Wundrous Society.

Morrigan, though concerned that she apparently does not have a "knack" or little power, a prerequisite for joining the Wundrous Society, passes the first half of the Book Trial, but struggles with the Nevermoorian History section of the exam and just barely passes, meeting Hawthorne Swift for the first time afterwards. They quickly become best friends.

In the Chase Trial, Morrigan must race against three hundred children to hit one of only one hundred and fifty targets. Morrigan is about to win, and claim an invitation to a prestigious dinner hosted by the High Elders of the Wundrous Society, but she turns back to help a young girl, Cadence Blackburn, who fell off her own animal. Cadence steals the prize from Morrigan through using her knack of mind control on a race official, but later convinces the official to let Morrigan pass just before Morrigan is about to be arrested for illegal immigration.

While at a Hallowmas festival called the Black Parade (the book's equivalent of Halloween), Morrigan and Hawthorne stop to help an old lady who calls for their help, having fallen down into a sewer. Upon Morrigan climbing down into the sewer, the woman vanishes and reappears as a member of the witch group Coven Thirteen, who announces the beginning of the Fright Trial. Both Morrigan and Hawthorne pass the Fright Trial, meeting Cadence again along the way. Morrigan's biggest fear is revealed in the Fright Trial to be getting sent back to Jackalfax and attacked by the Hunt of Smoke and Shadow.

At the Show Trial, where contenders showcase their unique knacks for the Elders, Morrigan believes that she will lose, but Jupiter appears at the last minute. Using his own knack as a 'Witness', (the book's equivalent of an empath) he shares his special ability with the Elders for a brief moment and directs them to look at Morrigan. She immediately passes. When the trials are over, an officer named Inspector Flintlock confronts Jupiter, claiming that as Morrigan has completed the trials and no longer under the legal protection of the Wundrous Society, she is eligible to be deported back to Jackalfax. Jupiter convinces the Elders to give him until the Inauguration Day of Unit 919 to come up with nine signatories on the legal papers (known as a 'Safeguard') that would allow Morrigan to stay.

While riding home with Hawthorne on a train, Morrigan is kidnapped by the Wundersmith Ezra Squall, a man who can control the mysterious energy of Wunder and committed a massacre in Nevermoor one hundred years ago, resulting in his exile from the Free State to the Wintersea Republic. Squall informs her that all cursed children who are born on Eventide, including Morrigan, are Wundersmiths, and he sends the Hunt of Smoke and Shadow after them each year in order to kill them, due to his desire to maintain a monopoly on the balance of Wunder in the Wintersea Republic. However, he sent the Hunt of Smoke and Shadow after Morrigan in order to make her his apprentice.

=== Wundersmith ===
Ten-year-old Morrigan Crow is Jupiter finds a ninth signatory for Morrigan's legal papers, and learns that a great singer named Cassiel has mysteriously disappeared. Meanwhile, Morrigan does not feel that she fits in with the others in Unit 919, and some of the patrons think she should not even be in the Wundrous Society at all. Later, after discovering a new door which has appeared in her hotel room overnight which leads to Unit 919's private train station, Morrigan and the rest of Unit 919 are given a tour by their train conductor, Miss Cheery, where they meet the Scholar Mistress of the Wundrous Society's schooling division. They are also told that the schooling is split into two sections: the Mundane Arts and the Arcane Arts. Morrigan is in the Mundane Arts section. After learning that another important Wundrous Society figure, Paximus Luck, has gone missing, Morrigan begins to worry, a feeling that gets increased when she is put in only one class, that lasts all day, in which she learns about all the heinous crimes committed by past Wundersmiths. Jupiter makes her feel better and arranges another class for her, about navigating the crazy and "ridiculous" streets of Nevermoor. Later, after an encounter with a group of bullies, Morrigan develops a theory that all the people who have gone missing could have been taken to the Ghastly Market, an illegal black market where one can buy things like weapons, or even human beings.

The bullies return, and Morrigan accidentally lets out a blast of fire to keep them from hurting Miss Cheery, getting her in major trouble, then banned from Wunsoc campus so she has to take classes at the Hotel Deucalion. Meanwhile, mysterious notes keep appearing for Unit 919, saying that the unit must meet certain demands or they will "reveal the terrible truth about Unit 919." The unit becomes frantic to meet the requests, but eventually blames their misfortune on Morrigan, thinking that the terrible truth is Morrigan's being a Wundersmith. Morrigan has a brief encounter with the Ghastly Market itself, and she discovers that it actually is real. Afterwards, she gets reaccepted back into the society after the staff of the Hotel Deucalion purposefully annoy Professor Onstald throughout his stay. Morrigan gets lost and ends up meeting Squall again, who shows her how to control Wunder. On Hallowmas, Squall comes to Morrigan again, telling her that her friends—along with Onstald and the Angel Israfel—are in danger of being sold on the Ghastly Market. Morrigan and Hawthorne save them, but Onstald stays behind, sacrificing himself so the others can survive. Later, at a Wundrous Society gathering, Morrigan reveals herself as a Wundersmith as per the last of the blackmail demands, and the Elders reveal that the blackmailing was all a loyalty test to see if the members of Unit 919 could work together.

=== Hollowpox ===
Ten-year-old Morrigan Crow is On the last day of their first year in the Wundrous Society, the members of Unit 919 partake in a class called Containment & Distraction, as an intro to the harder class they will have to take the following year. Later, across the time of about a month, Wunimals- animal-like creatures which are just as intelligent as humans- begin attacking people. The first incident takes place when a leopardwun tries to attack Hawthorne, his baby sister and Morrigan on a train, but is thwarted by a group of elderly women. Afterwards, Fenestra picks Morrigan up and she senses her acting unusual. At a Christmas dinner, Dame Chanda Kali reveals that her friend and favorite fashion designer was a leopardwun who had recently been found comatose, and the hotel staff –Morrigan included— begin to worry. Later, during her first day of school of the New Year, Morrigan meets a new scholar mistress, Rosenfeld, who takes her to the School of Wundrous Arts, where anyone can train in skills like Professor Onstald's to stop time, and learn about Wundersmiths. Morrigan meets the members of the Sub 9 Study Group, including Conall and Sofia. Later, Morrigan is attacked by a rabid Bearwun and Dame Chanda Kali is nearly killed by a Horsewun. Morrigan keeps noticing a strange green light in their eyes as they lose their minds. Fenestra, who cornered the offending Horsewun in a dark alley, reveals that she smashed his skull into the wall four times before becoming comatose, and that there was 'blood everywhere'. Dame Chanda explains that only a few decades ago, Wunimals were treated as less than humans, as if they had the intelligence of a common house pet. In the Wundrous Society, Wunimals are warned of the virus that infects only them, causing them to act aggressively and become catatonic and "hollow," and the infection is dubbed "Hollowpox." Jupiter, a Witness (meaning he can see people's invisible traits and fears), tells Morrigan that infected Wunimals simply have nothing. No thoughts or feelings or memories. When more Wunimals become infected, Jupiter and Jack are put to work using their Witness powers to find and stop them before they cause irreversible damage.

Meanwhile, Unit 919 is forced to continue classes, with Morrigan retreating more and more often to the School of Wundrous Arts, where she finds a book, The Book of Ghostly Hours, where she can relive experiences and lessons of Wundersmiths of the past, who really weren't all evil. Laurent St. James, leader of the Concerned Citizens of Nevermoor, begins pounding the Wunimals in the press, saying they should be locked up together or banned from city establishment, much to Morrigan, Jupiter, and the rest of the Hotel Deucalion staff's horror. When Holliday Wu and the Elders anonymously reveal Morrigan's Wundersmith abilities to the non-Wundrous Society public, St. James switches to her, provoking newspapers to claim that she is not an actual Wundersmith, and offers a large reward to anybody who can photograph her using her abilities. Morrigan tracks Hollowpox back to President Wintersea from the Wintersea Republic, named Maud Lowry. Lowry admits that her state has developed a Hollowpox cure, and promises Morrigan that she will try to distribute the cure across Nevermoor and the Free State, but Squall comes to her and warns her that Lowry was the one who commissioned him to create the virus. He helps Morrigan destroy the virus, and some of the Wunimals wake up. Once Morrigan finds out that not all of the Wunimals were cured, she summons Squall and he uses wunder through her to revive all the comatose Wunimals at the expense of Morrigan becoming his apprentice.

== Characters ==
=== Introduced in book 1 ===
- Morrigan Crow is the main character of the series. She was born on Eventide, the last day of the age in the Wintersea Republic, where she grew up. The people in the city considered her cursed, as during every new age in the Wintersea Republic, Wundersmith Ezra Squall secretly sends out his skeletal Hunt of Smoke and Shadow to kill every cursed child, as they might be Wundersmiths too and he is scared that they will use up all his precious Wunder. Morrigan's family resents her for her curse, especially her father, a powerful politician who sees Morrigan as a burden on his career. Upon becoming part of the Wundrous Society's Unit 919, Morrigan feels she does not fit in with the rest of the unit when they start acting strangely around her.
- Jupiter North rescues Morrigan from her terrible fate on Eventide. He is a member of the Wundrous Society, and often goes on adventures as a part of the League of Explorers. In Wundersmith: The Calling of Morrigan Crow, Jupiter is forced to attend these missions more frequently, and he feels bad that he is not there for Morrigan. Jupiter is the uncle of John Arjuna Korrapati, and is the owner or the Deucalion Hotel, where he works and lives. Jupiter is a Witness, meaning that his knack allows him to see the truth in everything he sees or hears.
- Hawthorne Swift is Morrigan's best friend in books two and three and towards the end of book one. Hawthorne meets Morrigan through the Wundrous Society's trials, in which he also competes. As a dragonrider, Hawthorne was immediately accepted into the society after the Show Trial after demonstrating his skills to the Elders. Hawthorne has an older brother, by the name of Homer, who took a vow of silence and now wears a blackboard around his neck on which he writes comments and questions for his family to read. He also has an older sister named Helena and a younger sister called Davina, nicknamed Baby Dave.
- Ezra Squall is known as the Last Wundersmith, who lived one hundred years ago. He disgraced the name of the Wundersmiths and Nevermoor when he massacred most of the city on Courage Square. Since then, he became somewhat of an immortal monster, forever gathering forces to invade the city from which he was banished. In Nevermoor: The Trials of Morrigan Crow, after Morrigan is accepted into the Wundrous Society, Squall comes to her and tells her she is a Wundersmith. Following that, Squall tries to get Morrigan to join him and let him train her, but after a few lessons from the madman, she opts to take Squall's advice and learn the Wretched Arts, but instead chooses to learn them from her Wundrous Society teacher, the Scholar Mistress.
- Corvus Crow is Morrigan's father from the Wintersea Republic. As an important political figure who often represented the country, Corvus saw Morrigan as a nuisance and bad luck for his career. In the beginning of Nevermoor: The Trials of Morrigan Crow, Corvus cannot wait for Eventide when Morrigan is destined to die so that his life can be back to normal. After Morrigan's mother's death, Corvus remarries. He and his new wife, Ivy Crow, have twins, Guntram and Wolfram, whom Morrigan sees when she visits Wintersea later in the book.
- John Arjuna Korrapati is Jupiter's nephew who prefers to go by the name of Jack. In Nevermoor: The Trials of Morrigan Crow, he comes to stay with his uncle at the Hotel Deucalion and immediately takes a disliking to the girl. However, near the end of the book, Jack and Morrigan are able to kindle a friendship. Jack is a Witness, like Jupiter, and is able to see the truth in everything. In book two, Wundersmith: The Calling of Morrigan Crow, Jack gives Morrigan a magical way to contact him in times of need, which Morrigan uses in the Ghastly Market.
- Fenestra, nicknamed Fen, is a giant cat, known as a Magnificat, who is also the head of housekeeping at the Hotel Deucalion. In the Wintersea Republic, Morrigan has seen Magnificats; however, she is amazed upon her arrival at Nevermoor to learn that they are sentient, and can actually talk. Fenestra also helps Morrigan during one of her trials.
- Dame Chanda Kali is a singer who has taken up a permanent residence in the Hotel Deucalion. She is a friend of Jupiter, and Morrigan, upon her arrival in Nevermoor. She gives Morrigan advice and helps her along her path in the first book, and appears in the next two installments. Her knack is drawing animals to her with her beautiful singing voice. She has a suitor for each day of the week, except Sundays.
- Cadence Blackburn is a mesmerist whom Morrigan first meets during the Chase Trial. In the trial, Cadence is knocked off her steed. Morrigan, who fears that Cadence will be trampled, goes against Fenestra's wishes and helps Cadence back on to her steed. However, Cadence steals the prize from Morrigan, who comes to hate the girl. Morrigan encounters her again during the Fright Trial, and then at the Show Trial when both girls are accepted into the Wundrous Society and then become friends. Morrigan also rescues Cadence from the Ghastly Market, where she is about to be illegally sold. Being a mesmerist, Cadence is hardly ever remembered by the other members of Unit 919 until they get used to her mesmerisim, and only Morrigan is initially immune.
- Noelle Devereaux is a young girl participating in the trials who is mean to both Cadence and Morrigan. Her patron is Baz Charlton, like Cadence; however, unlike her teammate, she does not become a member of the Wundrous Society after the trials and becomes infuriated because of it. Noelle does not appear in books two and three.
- Inspector Flintlock is a detective who is constantly trying to get Morrigan deported back to the Wintersea Republic throughout Nevermoor: The Trials of Morrigan Crow. Flintlock is stopped by Jupiter, who promises Elder Quinn that he will be able to find nine signatories to nullify Flintlock's charges, which he accomplishes in book two.
- Baz Charlton is Cadence's patron who has been described as a "spaghetti patron" in the book due to the fact that he usually submits multiple contestants into the trials each year in the hopes that at least one of them will get into the Wundrous Society. He is a minor antagonist in the series.
- Nan Dawson is Hawthorne's patron, a dragonrider who appears as a minor character in the series.
- Frank and Martha are two member of the staff of the Hotel Deucalion. Frank is a vampire dwarf in charge of 'party planning' at the hotel, and Martha is a human housemaid.
- Kedgeree, a concierge at the Hotel Deucalion.
- Other members of Unit 919 besides Morrigan, Hawthorne, and Cadence, are introduced as minor characters in the first book and play major roles in the rest of the series:
  - Francis John Fitzwilliam: a gastronomist and cook with the ability to induce emotions through the dishes he creates
  - Mahir Ibrahim: a linguist fluent in 39 different languages.
  - Thaddea Millicent Macleod: a skilled fighter.
  - Lambeth Amara (or Princess Lamya Bethari Amati Ra): a "short-range" oracle.
  - Anah Kahlo: a talented student doctor.
  - Archan Tate: an expert pickpocket.

=== Introduced in book 2 ===
- Angel Israfel is a singer whose voice, if listened to, will make the rest of one's life seem anticlimactic. He serves as the ninth signatory for the papers that allow Morrigan to stay in Nevermoor, and was also captured by the Ghastly Market to be sold; however, he escaped when Morrigan and Hawthorne brought down the establishment.
- Marina Cheery is the conductor of Unit 919's 'hometrain', a train which leads directly from their houses to the Wunsoc campus.
- Ms Dearborn/Murgatroyd: the Scholar Mistress of the Wundrous Society with the knack of changing her physical appearance and personality. Dearborn is the Scholar Mistress of the School of Mundane Arts and Murgatroyd is the Scholar Mistress of the School of Arcane Arts.
- Professor Hemingway Q. Onstald is a teacher in the Wundrous Society and founder of the Sub-Nine Academic Group (introduced in book 3). He is a Wunnimal, meaning he is part human and part animal. He has the shell of a tortoise, as well as being incredibly slow. Onstald sacrifices himself for Morrigan to escape at the Ghastly Market. Despite Henry Mildmay believing Onstald's knack was Timekeeping, in reality he learned the Wunderous art of Tempus at the Sub-Nine Academic Group, with his real knack being unknown. It is assumed by Conall O'Leary and Sofia of the Sub-Nine Academic Group to be something Mundane.
- Five of Charlton's patrons in the society have formed the group of bullies called the Charlton Five, and they bully Morrigan throughout the second book. Heliose and Alfie, two members of the group, have been named in the series. Alfie, whose knack allows him to breathe underwater, was almost sold to the Ghastly Market but was able to escape. However, his knack was mysteriously taken during his capture and was not regained.
- Hawthorne's family, who appear in books two and three at Hallowmas and Christmas parades. The family includes Dave Swift, Hawthorne's father, Catriona 'Cat' Swift, Hawthorne's mother, their oldest daughter Helena, their second-oldest son Homer, Hawthorne himself, and Davina, also known as Baby Dave and is a toddler.
- Henry Mildmay is a teacher of Geography in the Wundrous Society who teaches the members of Unit 919 in his class how to navigate the city of Nevermoor. He is revealed to have been working for Ezra Squall and attempts to sell Cadence, Lambeth and Onstald to the Ghastly Market. He is implied to have been killed by Squall's Hunt of Smoke and Shadow at the end of the book. His knack is unknown.

=== Introduced in book 3 ===
- Gavin Squires is a member of the Wundrous Society's Beastly Division who gathers a task force to hunt down the Nevermoorian Scaly Sewer Beast. His knack is unknown.
- Holliday Wu is a member of the Public Distraction Department and a manager of public relations between the Wundrous Society and the Nevermoorian general public. Her knack is unknown.
- Rook Rosenfeld is the Scholar Mistress of the School of Wundrous Arts, and a part of Ms Dearborn/Murgatroyd.
- Conall O'Leary is an Arcane teacher and head of the Sub-Nine Academic Group, an archival group dedicated to studying and preserving the Wundrous Arts. His knack is clairvoyance, specifically communication with the dead.
- Sofia is a member of the Sub-Nine Academic Group and a Foxwun. She eventually succumbs to the Hollowpox, before being saved by Morrigan. Her knack is unknown.
- Laurent St. James is the leader of The Concerned Citizens of Nevermoor, a group dedicated to inciting panic in the general public about Wunimals. Their focus shifts to Morrigan upon the discovery of the general public that she is a new Wundersmith.
- Maud Lowry is the president of the Wintersea Republic, a separate country to the Free State (where Nevermoor is located). She is an antagonist in the third book.
- In addition, multiple past Wundersmiths appear in tutorial-esque time loops around the city that Morrigan is able to track through The Book of Ghostly Hours in the School of Wundrous Arts.

== Development ==
Four books have been released so far. The fourth book was officially announced after the third one was released. Multiple publishing companies were vying for the rights to Townsend's book series, so Townsend eventually signed a deal with Hachette Book Group to write two more after the fourth one. But, according to Townsend, she has a plot planned for a total of nine books in the series. Multiple reviews have compared the fantasy book series to the Harry Potter book series. The Sydney Morning Herald has said The Nevermoor Series has "move[d] into J. K. Rowling territory", with Townsend noting that Rowling and the Harry Potter series were major inspirations to her writing.

The cover art of the series is done by Beatriz Castro for the United Kingdom editions, while Jim Madsen is credited with the Australian and United States editions.

== Reception ==
All the books in The Nevermoor Series have been generally well received. A review in Common Sense Media compared the plot and Townsend's writing style to that of the Harry Potter book series. At the Australian Book Industry Awards in 2018, the Book of the Year Award was given to Nevermoor: The Trials of Morrigan Crow. The Premier's Award for best overall published work, as well as the Children's Award were both awarded to Nevermoor: The Trials of Morrigan Crow at the Adelaide Festival Awards for Literature.

The second book, Wundersmith: The Calling of Morrigan Crow, has been noted as having "middle book syndrome"; it does not advance the plot as much as the other two books, but is still as enjoyable as them. Morrigan herself has gotten praise for being "at times timid, at times powerful, and always hungry for both affection and learning."

Book three in the series, titled Hollowpox: The Hunt for Morrigan Crow, is "packed with all the magic, humour, and heart that readers have come to expect from the collection so far. It's another home run for Townsend and her wonderfully crafted heroine," as a review on The AU read. Gilly Reads said the third book was "perfectly delivered" and "packed with adventure, mystery and turmoil." Hollowpox has also won the Waterstones Children's Book Prize in 2020. Critics have also praised Townsend's ability to "keep readers on edge for the duration of her book, hanging on every word."

== Audiobooks ==
In 2017, actress Gemma Whelan was announced to be voicing the series in an audiobook format. She read all three books aloud, their lengths varying from 11 to 14 hours. Whelan "ably presents the funny and enticing tale of a "cursed" girl who avoids meeting her doom by escaping to a world where she encounters strange and miraculous people, creatures, and events" in her readings. Her English accent has also been praised, as well as her "talent for producing different voices, [which] will remind listeners of Jim Dale's performances of the Harry Potter series. She gives each voice a unique characteristic that brings each character to life."
