= Focus Designs =

- Company type: Private Corporation
- Founded: 2007
- Headquarters: Camas, Washington
- Website: focusdesigns.com

Focus Designs is an American based designer and distributor of self-balancing unicycles. It is known as the first company to build and release the first commercially available self-balancing unicycle. The company appeared in a 2012 episode of the Shark Tank where it was offered funding from the Sharks.

== History ==
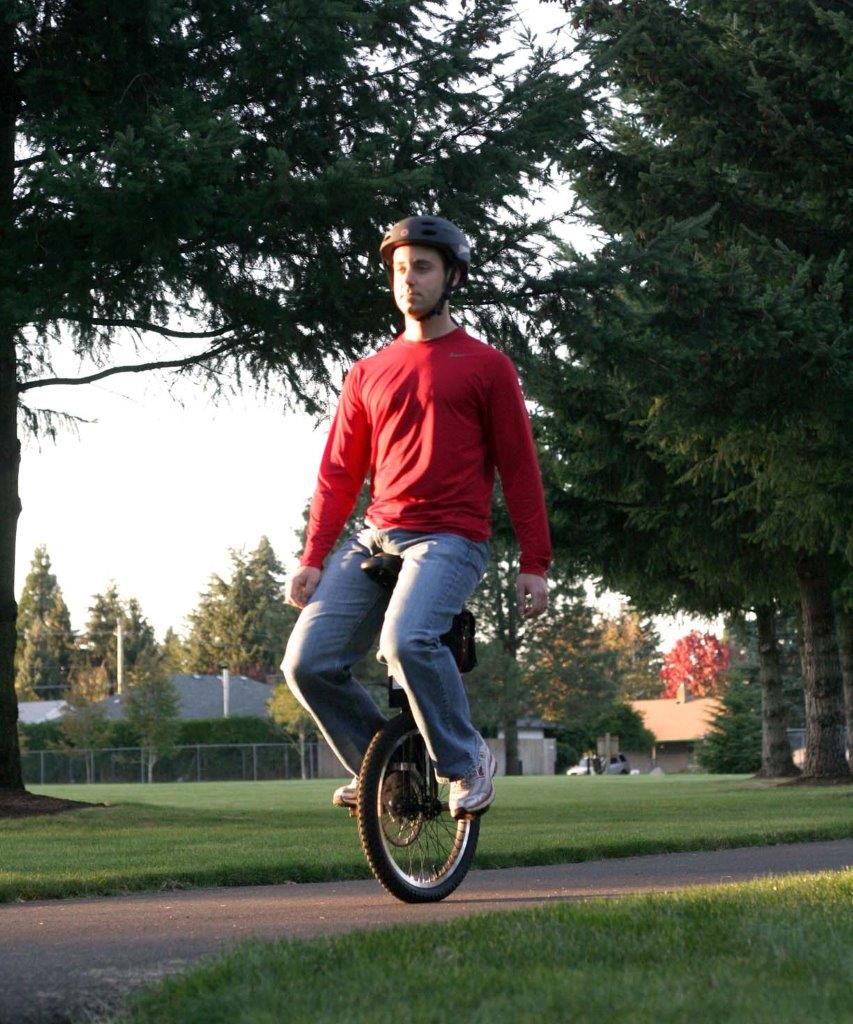
Daniel Wood, inventor of commercially available self-balancing unicycle, and founder of Focus Designs.

Focus Designs was incorporated in 2007 by Daniel Wood. He had been working at U.S. Digital in Vancouver, Washington and built a prototype that he rode in the parking lot of the company. After being laid off from the company, Wood decided to pursue the hobby of a self-balancing unicycle. The company began with Wood building a prototype in his garage which he converted from a Nimbus unicycle. David Martschinske, another former U.S. Digital employee, joined Focus Designs in 2011 and helped pitch the idea on the Shark Tank in 2012.

Focus Designs received its first angel round of investments in 2011. Focus Designs attempted to receive additional funding for the company with the help of the ABC television show Shark Tank. Wood and Martschinske pitched the product on the show and eventually were offered a $300,000 investment for 30% of the company. They accepted the offer on the show, but they eventually turned down.

The company began with distribution in the United States, but also distributes the vehicle through a Japanese partner and is said to be expanding distribution to other parts of the world including Europe and the Russian market, which they entered in 2011.

== Products ==
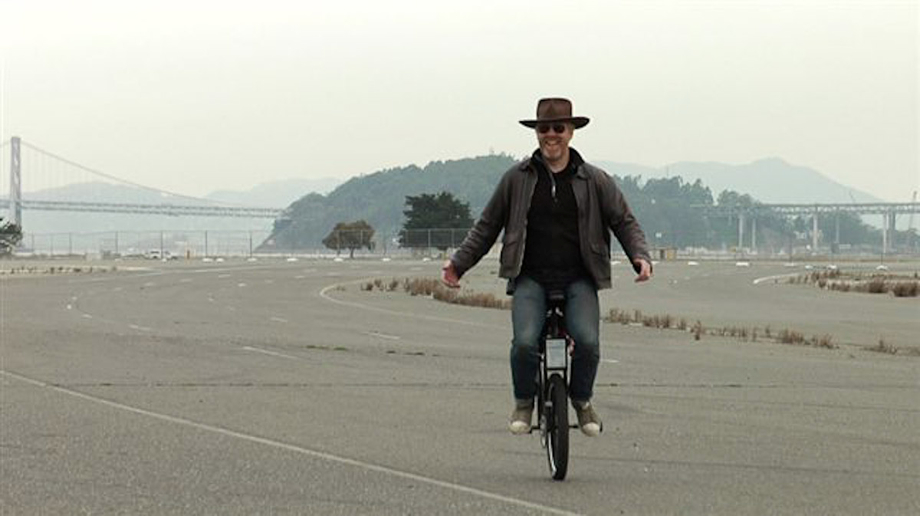
Adam Savage of MythBusters Riding on a SBU1 self-balancing unicycle from Focus Designs.

Focus Designs distributes a self-balancing unicycle which was first made available commercially on October 17, 2008. It is electric with the original design going up to 12 miles on a full charge, weighing 27 pounds, and having a maximum speed of approximately 10 miles per hour. The units utilize sensors, gyros, accelerometers, algorithms, and a hub-mounted motor that slows down or speeds up to help a rider maintain a forward and backward balance. The company has upgraded to different versions over the years, From SBUV2 to SBUV3, that includes increasing the top speed to 15 miles per hour and the vehicle traveling up to two hours on a full charge.

Focus Designs also contributed to the invention of the Solowheel, a vehicle similar to the self-balancing unicycle but without a seat. The company consulted and licensed its technology for use in the vehicle. The Solowheel (Inmotion V5 and V8) has two 212 mm long pedals to stand on and leg contact surfaces which allow for stable, precise control in lieu of a seat. The Solowheel became the basis for a new law in the state of Washington, amending the previous law that only allowed the use of Segway devices on pedestrian paths.
