= Steph Bowe =

Australian novelist and blogger (1994–2020)

- Born: 1 February 1994; Melbourne, Victoria, Australia
- Died: 20 January 2020 (aged 25); Gold Coast, Queensland, Australia
- Occupations: Novelist and blogger
- Website: www.stephbowe.com

Steph Bowe (1 February 1994 – 20 January 2020) was an Australian novelist and blogger. She published three young adult novels between 2010 and 2017 and is best known for her final novel, Night Swimming. She was known for mentoring young writers around Australia. Her blog, which she began at age 15, was also popular and received about 12,000 hits per month.

Bowe was diagnosed with T-lymphoblastic lymphoma in April 2019, and died from the condition on 20 January 2020. She was 25 years old.

In February 2021 Text Publishing announced the Steph Bowe Mentorship for Young Writers. It is open to writers under 25 years of age and provides 20 hours of manuscript development assistance and writers' centre membership to the winner.

== Bibliography ==
- Girl Saves Boy (2010)
- All This Could End (2013)
- Night Swimming (2017)
