= Paul Voermans =

Australian author (born 1960)

Paul Voermans (born 4 June 1960) is an Australian performer, community IT advocate, and writer of prose and poetry, whose work includes a number of novels. Published as science fiction, the novels contain elements of surrealism, horror, and humour. They have been compared to RA Lafferty and Douglas Adams.

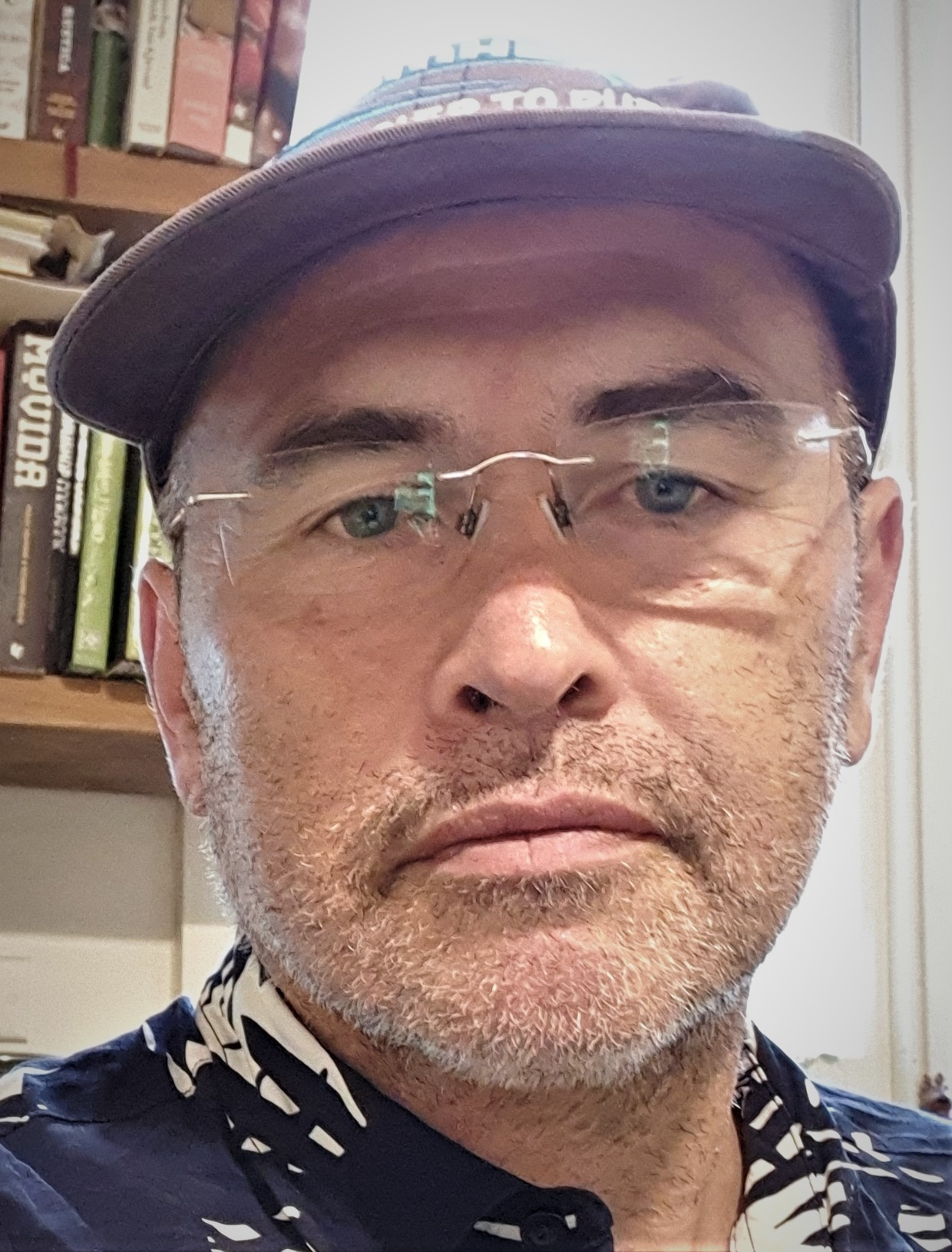
Paul Voermans 2019

== Life and career ==
Paul Voermans was born in Traralgon, Victoria, in 1960. The son of Indo refugees, Voermans was brought up in suburban Melbourne under the White Australia Policy and during a wave of European immigration. In the 1970s, while still a teenager, he studied writing with Vonda McIntyre, Christopher Priest, and George Turner at a Clarion-style workshop held at Monash University.

After studying drama at Melbourne State College, Voermans helped found B'Spell Performance Troupe, a community puppet and Commedia dell'arte theatre company, associated with Handspan Theatre, Suitcase Theatre, and the Magic Mushroom Mime Troupe, performing at festivals around Australia, in schools, on streets, and a number of alternative Melbourne venues such as the Why Not Theatre and The Universal Theatre in the 1970s and 1980s.

Voermans exhibited masks and puppets at the National Gallery of Victoria and the Arts Centre Melbourne and taught mime at the Victorian College of the Arts. He played the silent character Max Box in Trapp, Winkle & Box for ABC TV, appearing with Wendy Harmer, Robert Forza, and Lynda Gibson, before moving to the United Kingdom for a number of years, where he wrote his first novel while working as a butler and in the kitchen of a psychiatric institution in the late 1980s.

Returning to Australia in the 1990s, Voermans helped launch VICNET, a proto-Internet service provider and community web publisher at the State Library of Victoria, leading the technical team that produced early versions of the genealogy database, social media (My Connected Community), and intranet, installing free public internet in libraries based on a direct US satellite service, and advocating for information equality for regional and other disadvantaged groups. He has since worked for the Victorian Government in Information Technology innovation, cloud computing and remote working.

Voermans has recently returned to publishing novels. He lives in South Gippsland, near Meeniyan.

== Themes ==
Theatre, colonialism, natural history, insanity, the dynamics of friendship groups, along with off-the-wall and often scatological humour, are all preoccupations for Paul Voermans. Chantal Zabus has described And Disregards the Rest, a novel involving The Tempest and alien invasion, as being about "ecocide", saying "Voermans is aware of the intertext that emerged, in the 1980s, strata from sci-fi texts and 'high art' postmodernist fiction", asserting that "And Disregards the Rest indubitably draws on the cyberpunk repertoire".

Critic and novelist George Turner once wrote about Voermans's work that "there are enough things wrong with this novel to sink the collected writings of Tolstoy and Dickens", noting that these faults might not stand in the way of Voermans's writing career.

Paul Voermans's themes are more directly accessible in his poetry.

== Work ==
=== Novels ===
- And Disregards the Rest, Victor Gollancz, (1992) also appeared as:
  - Translation: Die letzte Vorstellung [German] Heyne (1999)
- The Weird Colonial Boy Victor Gollancz, (1993) also appeared as:
  - Translation: Der Quantenfisch [German] Heyne (1996)
- Giving it Away (excerpt), Overland 133, (1993)
- Parliament of Sims (excerpt), Overland 188, Jill Sparrow (co-author) (2007)
- The White Library, PS Publishing (2020)

=== Short fiction ===
- "The Broken Butterfly", The View from the Edge, George Turner (ed.), Norstrilia Press (1977)
- "The Beastie in Man", FEAR Magazine (1990)
- "Malcolm and the Intergalactic Slug-Suckers", The Lottery: Nine Science Fiction Stories, Lucy Sussex (ed.) Omnibus Books / Ashton Scholastic Group (1994)
- "My Sister, Cristeta, Who Is Magic", Alien Shores, Peter McNamara; Margaret Winch (eds.) Aphelion Publications (1994)
- "The Girl Who Stole the Current Buns from the Space/Time Kitchen", Aurealis #13 (1994)

=== Essays ===
- Write Your Bloody Heart Out: Re-regarding Disregards (1993)
- The Future's Not Ours to See Reading by Starlight: Postmodern Science Fiction (1996) by Damien Broderick(2000)

=== Reviews ===
- Call to the Edge by Sean McMullen, SF Commentary, 73/74/75, (1993)
- "Scripts Deep Enough: Kim Stanley Robinson's Antarctica" New York Review of Science Fiction (1999)
- Fifty Degrees Below, Kim Stanley Robinson, Subtopia by AL McCann, Australian Speculative Fiction: A Genre Overview, by Donna Maree Hanson (ed) The Fiction Factory, by Jack Dann & friends, Year's Best Australian Science Fiction And Fantasy - Vol.1 Bill Congreve (ed), ABC Book Show, ABC Radio National (2005-2006).
- "Technique of Awful: When Extremity Takes Us Past the Real", New York Review of Science Fiction (2017)

=== Interviews ===
- Australian Landscapes (1993) by Steven Paulsen

=== Exhibitions ===
"Manipulating Reality, Puppetry and Mask in Australia" at the National Gallery of Victoria (1981)

=== Performance ===
B'Spell Performance Troupe:

- Bitz
- Don't Laugh this is Cirrus
- The Deceived
- Of Rats and Men

Jika Jika Puppets: The Adventures of Platypus Phil

Aaargh! Solo Performance

Dobba (with Karl Presser).

"Wild Thing" Darebin Arts Centre, The Five O'Clock Shadows

"Trapp, Winkle & Box", ABC TV

=== Poetry ===
Dunning-Kruger Dance Mirror, the website of Paul Voermans.

=== Awards ===
The novels And Disregards the Rest and The Weird Colonial Boy were shortlisted for the Australian Science Fiction Achievement Award, Ditmar Award.

== Sources ==
- The Encyclopaedia of Science Fiction
- The Speculative Fiction Database
- The New York Review of Science Fiction
- National Library of Australia
- Strange Constellations: A History of Australian Science Fiction
