= Wundersmith: The Calling of Morrigan Crow =

2018 Australian fantasy novel by Jessica Townsend

Wundersmith
- First edition (AUS)
- Author: Jessica Townsend
- Cover artist: Jim Madsen
- Language: English
- Series: The Nevermoor series
- Genre: Fantasy
- Publisher: Lothian Books (AUS); Orion Books (UK); Little, Brown (US)
- Publication date: Sep 25, 2018 (AUS); Oct 30, 2018 (UK); Nov 13, 2018 (US)
- Publication place: Australia
- Media type: Print (Paperback and Hardback)
- Pages: 521
- Preceded by: Nevermoor: The Trials of Morrigan Crow
- Followed by: Hollowpox: The Hunt for Morrigan Crow

Wundersmith: The Calling of Morrigan Crow is an Australian fantasy novel written by Jessica Townsend as the second book in The Nevermoor series. The novel was published by Lothian Books on October 30, 2018, in Australia, Orion Books in the United Kingdom and Little, Brown on November 13, 2018, in the United States. Wundersmith follows Morrigan Crow as she undergoes Nevermoorian schooling, learns and challenges her place within the prestigious Wundrous Society, and manages being a Wundersmith, a type of magician who can control the mysterious energy of Wunder.

== Setting ==
The novel, like all of the Nevermoor series, is set in Nevermoor, a magical city with talking animals, superpowers, and steampunk gadgets and devices. Major locations in Wundersmith include the Hotel Deucalion (Jupiter's home and place of business as well as Morrigan's), the Wunsoc campus as the main location from which the Wundrous Society operates, and the Ghastly Market, a black market that rotates its location throughout the novel and is central to the plot of Wundersmith.

== Characters ==
- Morrigan Odelle Crow: a young girl who was saved from her terrible fate on Eventide by Jupiter North. She is also a Wundersmith (someone who can shape and control the fantasy energy source of wunder).
- Jupiter North: the patron of Morrigan. He is the owner of the Hotel Deucalion, a member of the Wundrous Society and the adjacent League of Explorers and the uncle of Jack Korrapati. He has the knack of a 'Witness', with the ability to see physical representations of a person's thoughts, feelings and memories by looking at them.
- Hawthorne Swift: Morrigan's best friend who is also a member of Unit 919. He is a skilled dragon rider.
- John Arjuna Korrapati: Jupiter's nephew. He has the knack of a Witness like Jupiter, but is not a part of the Wundrous Society.
- Ezra Squall: the only other living Wundersmith aside from Morrigan, and exiled to the Wintersea Republic for the Courage Square Massacre a hundred years before the events of the series. Throughout the series he attempts to make Morrigan his apprentice.
- Angel Israfel: a singer whose voice is so enchanting it makes the rest of the lives of those who hear it seem worthless by comparison.
- Dame Chanda Kali: a member of the Wundrous society whose knack allows her to call animals when she sings. She lives permanently in the Hotel Deucalion.
- Baz Charlton: the patron of Cadence Blackburn and the Charlton Five, a group of older students who often bully younger students, including Morrigan.
- Miss Cheery: the conductor of Unit 919's private train that leads directly from their homes to the Wunsoc campus.
- Ms Dearborn/Murgatroyd: the Scholar Mistress of the Wundrous Society with the knack of changing her physical appearance and personality. Dearborn is the Scholar Mistress of the School of Mundane Arts and Murgatroyd is the Scholar Mistress of the School of Arcane Arts.
- Hemingway Q. Onstald: An anthropomorphic tortoise or 'tortoise-wun' with an unknown mundane knack as well as the ability to slow down time. He is a teacher of Wundersmith history and has written several books on the subject.
- Unit 919: the newest unit of the Wundrous Society. Besides the seven following, Morrigan and Hawthorne are also members:
  - Francis John Fitzwilliam: a gastronomist and cook with the ability to induce emotions through the dishes he creates.
  - Mahir Ibrahim: a linguist fluent in 39 different languages.
  - Thaddea Millicent Macleod: a skilled fighter.
  - Lambeth Amara (or Princess Lamya Bethari Amati Ra): a "short-range" oracle.
  - Anah Kahlo: a talented student doctor.
  - Cadence Lenore Blackburn: a mesmerist with the power of mind control. Her power inadvertently makes the other members of Unit 919 forget who she is; only Morrigan is immune to this effect.
  - Archan Tate: an expert pickpocket.
- Henry Mildmay: A geography teacher with a knack for cartography.

== Plot ==
Jupiter North, Morrigan Crow's patron and caretaker, takes her to a performance of the Angel Israfel, and tells Israfel that he needs him to become the ninth and final signatory to a safeguard pact that will allow Morrigan, the newest Wundersmith, to remain in Nevermoor legally under Wundrous Society protection.

After they leave, Jupiter admits that he has been planning Morrigan a twelfth birthday party, and promises that it will be discreet. However when they arrive at Jupiter's place of business the Hotel Deucalion, Jupiter's employee Frank is revealed to have made it into a theatrical occasion, with all the staff and guests being on the front steps of the Hotel Deucalion to greet the pair. Jupiter asks Morrigan if she wants him to reprimand Frank for throwing a large celebration against Morrigan's original wishes, but Morrigan is delighted, since she had never had a birthday party when she was in her homeland of Jackalfax in the Wintersea Republic due to her status as a "cursed child" destined to die on Eventide.

Unit 919 is initiated into the Wundrous Society, receiving gold pins in the shape of the letter W to indicate their new status as Society members. The High Council of Elders command Unit 919's patrons and their scholars to remain behind to discuss Morrigan being a Wundersmith. Despite opposition from several patrons over Morrigan's inclusion in Unit 919 and fear from a few of her fellow scholars, Jupiter insists that being a Wundersmith does not make one evil. Elder Quinn concurs by declaring that anyone who reveals Morrigan's knack will, along with the rest of Unit 919, be expelled from the Wundrous Society.

The next morning, Morrigan discovers a new door in her hotel room, and ventures through to see a train station that is only for Unit 919. The others discover it too, and they are introduced to everything in the Wundrous Society by Miss Cheery. Cheery explains that the society is split into two schools: The School of Mundane Arts and The School of Arcane Arts. Morrigan is placed in the School of the Mundane Arts, which frustrates her. Originally, Unit 919 was supposed to be given a tour of the Wunsoc campus by Paximus Luck, a famous Mundane Wundrous Society professor. However he has gone missing.

The Scholar Mistress, Ms Dearborn, interferes with Morrigan's schedule so it is changed to have only one class; A History of All Heinous Wundrous Acts, taught by Professor Hemingway Q. Onstald. Upon arriving at the class, Onstald lectures Morrigan on the inherently immoral nature of being a Wundersmith, and concludes that she is beyond saving. After a week, Jupiter returns home from a mission with the League of Explorers and after listening to Morrigan's story, tells Morrigan that Onstald is incorrect in his assumptions about Wundersmiths, but Morrigan is reluctant to believe him. After bargaining with Ms Dearborn, Jupiter is able to get a geography class on Morrigan's schedule entitled Decoding Nevermoor, a class taught by Henry Mildmay and one which she shares with the rest of her unit.

After an encounter with the Charlton Five, bullies, who want her to reveal her knack even though the Elders specified that she mustn't, a note also appears for Unit 919, telling them that they must meet certain demands or the blackmailer that sent the note will reveal the secret of Unit 919. Everyone assumes it is Morrigan sending the notes being a Wundersmith. Morrigan learns about Tricksy Lanes, a way to get across town more quickly, but also more dangerously, in her map class, and they take a field trip to see one in Devilish Court with the effect of intense nausea. There, Morrigan continues through the Devil's Court Tricksy Lane despite the effects of the Court, and discovers two men discussing the Ghastly Market, a black market thought to be an urban legend, where illicit materials and Wunimals can be bought and sold. However, the lane beyond Devilish Court vanishes once she informs the Nevermoor City Police Department of its presence.

She starts looking into the mystery, thinking that those who disappeared could have been taken there. Due to the blackmail, part of the Unit starts to grow away from Morrigan, thinking that it's her fault that they have to go through so much trouble to meet the demands. Then, to make matters worse, one of the Charlton Five attacks Morrigan thinking that she did something to make Alfie, another member of the group who recently disappeared, leave. Miss Cheery comes to her rescue. Heloise, the girl, harms her and Morrigan spontaneously breathes fire sending Heloise to the hospital.

The Elders ban her from Wunsoc campus, making her attend classes from home. Morrigan visits the Nevermoor Bazaar, but wanders off and ends up in the Ghastly Market, proving its existence. There, she finds Alfie Swann, the member of the Charlton Five who disappeared, and returns him home, though he has lost his knack.

For her map class, Morrigan must navigate the streets of Nevermoor. She gets separated from her classmates and ends up getting lost. She is found and approached by the Hunt of Smoke and Shadow, who take her to see Squall again, who teaches her to control the Wunder around her.

She returns to the Hotel Deucalion, where Jupiter has just gotten back from a Wundrous Society trip. She informs him of her newfound power, and he warns her to be careful with it.

Later, on Hallowmas Eve, Morrigan confronts Professor Onstald about what she saw, and when she threatens to expose him as a fraud for putting false information in his book, he stops time temporarily, as his knack is called “Timekeeper.” When he is taken, the Black Parade is cancelled. However, Squall arrives once more, telling her that members of her Unit are being sold on the Ghastly Market, along with Onstald and the Angel Israfel.

Morrigan and Hawthorne arrive at the Ghastly Market where it is revealed that Lambeth is actually a deserter of the Wintersea Republic, a crime punishable by death. Morrigan uses her Wundersmith abilities to destroy the Ghastly Market once and for all, saving her friends, but Onstald stays behind, sacrificing himself for Morrigan and the others. At a Wundrous Society assembly, Morrigan gets blackmailed to reveal herself as a Wundersmith or Lambeth's secret will be revealed and she will likely be killed. Morrigan debates revealing her own secret, but then decides that it is the right thing to do. After telling the crowd, it is revealed that the demands were only a trust exercise for Unit 919 to make sure they could function as a team.

== Reception ==
The book was well received on Common Sense Media and Goodreads, with reviewers commenting on how relatable the book was to Harry Potter, like the last installment. Also, reviews on the website noted that "Morrigan's story felt a bit darker" in addition to the fact that the "stakes were higher too." A review on Booking In Heels admitted that the novel has "Middle Book Syndrome" in that it does not advance the plot. "In short, it’s an unnecessary book, but a really enjoyable one."

== Sequels ==
The third book in the series, Hollowpox: The Hunt for Morrigan Crow, was announced on May 31, 2019. The book is the second installation in The Nevermoor series, the first being Nevermoor: The Trials of Morrigan Crow. Hollowpox was released on September 29, 2020, in Australia after being delayed from January 28, 2020. The fourth novel, Silverborn: The Mystery of Morrigan Crow, was released on April 30, 2025 in Australia after being delayed from its original June 2022 release date. Though the publisher Hatchette Book Group officially announced signing for a six-book series, Townsend has stated that she has the plots planned out for a nine-book series.
