= Vicnet =

Former business unit of State Library of Victoria (1994–2014)

Vicnet (Victoria's Network) was a business unit of the State Library of Victoria, Australia operating between 1994 and 2014. It was an early Australian internet service provider that provided website space and training. It was Australia's largest web host for community organisations and projects such as Skills.Net and Libraries Online. The State Library of Victoria closed Vicnet on 31 January 2014.

== History ==
The State Library of Victoria and the Royal Melbourne Institute of Technology (RMIT) established a joint project to build a web-based publishing service and internet access provider for community organisations in 1993.

Vicnet worked with the State and federal government, private providers, the Victorian public library network and community based organisations across Victoria to address Digital Divide issues. Through a range of ICT programs Vicnet drove the roll out of public access internet points across Victoria and in the process connected every library in Victoria to the Internet for public access. To facilitate access, Vicnet staff delivered extensive training/community development programs across Victoria through government funded programs such as the Skills.net program (a program that was responsible for training more than 100,000 Victorians).

Additionally Vicnet developed an online publication platform and an extensive web directory for community and other organizations, as well as for members of the general population. Among many hundreds, Vicnet published and trained in the editing for the first web sites for the Melbourne International Comedy Festival, the Melbourne Formula One Grand Prix, the Indigenous Flora and Fauna Society, the Council on the Ageing (Victoria), The Age newspaper, and the Victorian Department of Premier and Cabinet.

With government assistance from Multimedia Victoria, Vicnet provided internet access to regional Victorian communities then out of the reach of any internet service, such as Mallacoota and Apollo Bay. With other early internet service providers it formed the Victorian Internet Exchange, an innovative network peering organisation, designed to put pressure on the cost of data.

By 2009, Vicnet was recognised for its work in culturally and linguistically diverse communities, and its digital inclusion services provided for 62 community language groups.

== Awards ==
- 1999 finalist for Skills.net program in the Global Bangemann Challenge
- 2009 Australia and New Zealand Internet Best Practice Awards - Best Diversity Initiative
