= Daniel Wood (entrepreneur) =

American inventor and entrepreneur

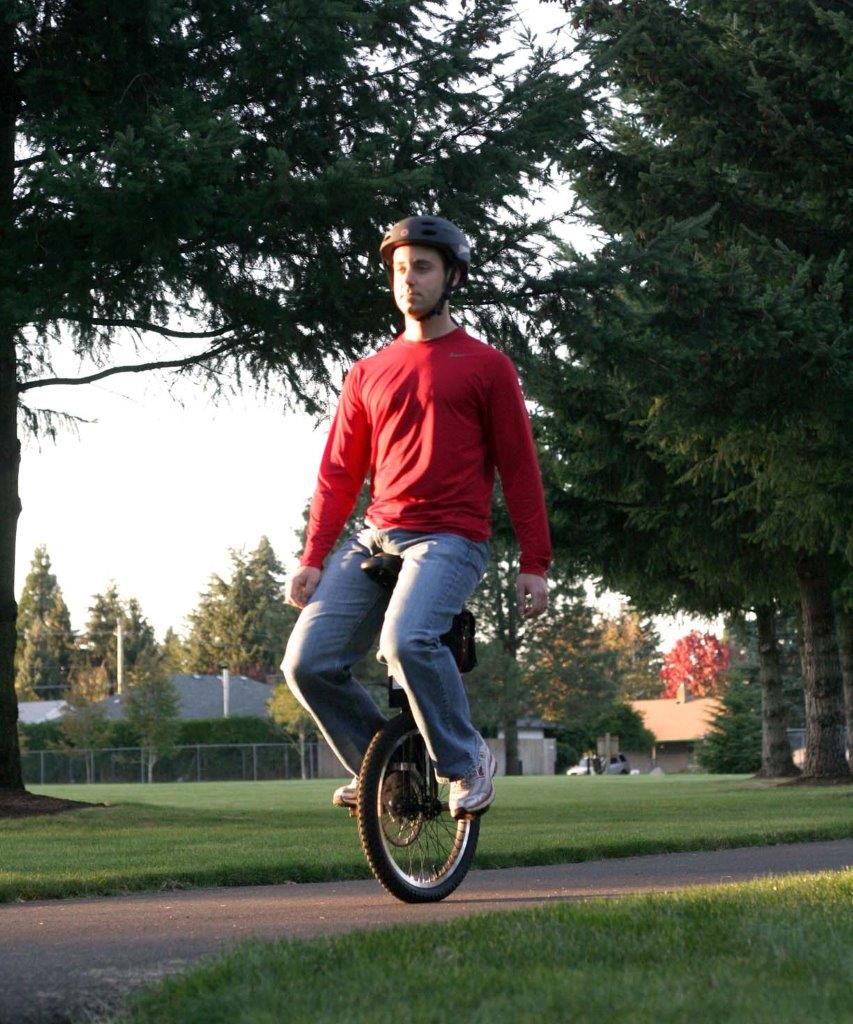
- Occupation(s): Inventor, Entrepreneur
- Employer(s): CEO, Focus Designs
- Known for: Inventor of self-balancing unicycle

Daniel Wood is an American inventor and entrepreneur, best known for creating the first commercially available self-balancing unicycle. He is currently the founder and CEO of Focus Designs. He is also the Director of Control Systems at Future Motion as well as an advisory council member at RYNO Motors.

== Career ==
Wood's early career began with U.S. Digital, a manufacturer of optical encoders based in Washington. He dropped out of high school and became a self-taught engineer, leading to his job at U.S. Digital. After a layoff from the company, it was difficult for him to find work due to not having a degree which most engineering jobs required. Competing in a difficult job market without a degree caused Wood to pursue his hobby which led to the creation of the self-balancing unicycle. Wood had previously invented a device called the Gimpy, a Segway-like device that was remote controlled. Wood used parts of this invention to help create the self-balancing unicycle. Despite there being self-balancing unicycles and concept vehicles built by hobbyists prior to Wood's invention, he is attributed as the first to make one available commercially.

Wood is the founder of Focus Designs, a company that distributes the self-balancing unicycle that Wood invented. He spent more than two years developing the technology. Despite electric unicycles being produced before Wood's product, his vehicle was attributed as the first to combine a gyroscope with a one wheeled vehicle to assist with rider's forward and reverse balance. In 2012, Wood appeared on an episode of the Shark Tank where he pitched his idea to potential investors. He was offered $300,000 for a 30% stake in the company, an offer that he eventually turned down.
