= Madeleine Ryan =

Australian novelist

- Born: 9 December 1988 (age 36); Melbourne, Australia
- Occupations: Novelist; filmmaker
- Notable work: A Room Called Earth
- Website: www.madeleineryan.com

Madeleine Ryan (born 9 December 1988) is an Australian novelist and filmmaker. She is known for her novel A Room Called Earth (2020).

== Early life ==
Ryan was born in Melbourne, Australia. Her parents were film and television critics. She graduated from the University of Melbourne with a Bachelor of Arts degree, majoring in English literature and creative writing.

== Career ==
Ryan's articles and essays have appeared in The New York Times, Vogue, SBS, The Daily Telegraph, The Sydney Morning Herald, VICE, Bustle, and Lenny Letter.

Ryan's debut novel A Room Called Earth was published in 2020 by Penguin Press in the US and Canada and by Scribe in the U.K. and Commonwealth.

Her second novel, The Knowing, was published by Scribe in 2025.
