= Factory 19 =

2020 novel by Dennis Glover

- Author: Dennis Glover
- Publisher: Black Inc.
- Publication date: 2020
- ISBN: 9781760641764

Factory 19 is a 2020 novel by Australian author Dennis Glover.

The narrator of the story is Paul Ritchey, who developed an allergy to digital technology, and relocates to a fictionalised Hobart. The city had previously been popular tourist attraction due to its "Gallery of Future Art" set up by billionaire Dundas Faussett. The Faussett character has been described as a "David Walsh-like figure. Faussett closes the gallery and Hobart becomes a ghost town. Two years later, Faussett reappears to create "Factory 19", a factory complex with worker residences that are modelled on life in March 1948. In the novel's fictional timeline, the date March 1948 was settled on as it was one month before the RAND corporation introduced its first mainframe computer.
