= Dervla McTiernan =

Irish-Australian crime novelist

- Born: County Cork, Ireland
- Education: University College Galway
- Occupation: Crime writer
- Known for: Internationally bestselling Irish-Australian crime writer of seven novels, including the Cormac Reilly series.
- Spouse: Kenny
- Children: 2
- Website: https://dervlamctiernan.com

Dervla McTiernan is an Irish-Australian crime novelist. McTiernan is the author of seven novels, including the four-book Cormac Reilly series and three standalone novels, as well as audio novellas. Her books have sold more than one million copies around the world and What Happened to Nina? and The Murder Rule are both currently in development for screen adaptation.

== Early life and career ==
Dervla McTiernan was born in County Cork, growing up initially in Carrigaline and Douglas there, before her father's work in the bank took the family to Dublin, aged six, and then Limerick. She is one of a family of seven.

McTiernan studied corporate law in University College Galway and went on to become a solicitor, training in Dublin. She returned to County Galway, to Oranmore, to build her legal practice, working in it for about twelve years. By then she was married to her husband Kenny, an engineer and they had a daughter, with a son on the way. Ireland hit a recession and the couple decided to move to Australia. McTiernan and her husband settled in Perth, Western Australia, where McTiernan got a part-time job working with the Mental Health Commission. She is now also an Australian citizen.

== Writing career ==
McTiernan began writing in 2014, and she signed her first publishing deal with HarperCollins Australia in 2016. Her first novel, The Rúin, was published in 2018. The Rúin is the first book in the author's bestselling Cormac Reilly series. The Rúin was awarded the Davitt Award for the Best Adult Crime Novel, the Ned Kelly Award for the Best First Novel, the Barry Award for Best Paperback Original and the Western Australian Premier's Book Award. It was also shortlisted for an Australian Book Industry Award, two Irish Book Awards, the Kate O'Brien Award and it was named one of Amazon US Best Books of the Year.

In 2019 McTiernan published the second book in the Cormac Reilly series, The Scholar which won the International Thriller Writers Award for best paperback novel and was shortlisted for an Australian Book Industry Award, a Davitt Award and a Ned Kelly Award.

In 2020, McTiernan published the third book in the Cormac Reilly series, The Good Turn, which debuted in the Australian bestseller charts as a number one bestseller and went on to win a Barry Award and be longlisted for the Australian Book Industry Awards.

In 2022, McTiernan published her first standalone thriller, The Murder Rule which was a number one bestseller in Australia and was named a New York Times Thriller of the Year.

In 2024, McTiernan published What Happened to Nina? which was a number one bestseller in Australia. It was named a New York Times Thriller of the Year, it won the Australian Book Industry Award General Fiction Book of the Year., and it was shortlisted for the International Thriller Writers Award for Best Standalone Mystery. It was also long listed for the Crime Writers Association Ian Fleming Steel Dagger.

In 2025, McTiernan published the fourth book in the Cormac Reilly series, The Unquiet Grave, which was an Australian number one bestseller and it was shortlisted for the Australian Book Industry Awards. In 2025, The Unquiet Grave was the most borrowed book across Australian libraries.

McTiernan has also written four audio novellas, The Fireground, The Wrong One, The Roommate and The Sisters.

== Writing style ==
McTiernan's novels combine police-procedural and psychological thriller elements with recurring themes of family, institutional failure and the justice system. Reviewers have compared her work to that of Tana French

== Setting ==
McTiernan's books have been set in Ireland, the United States and Australia.

=== Irish-set books ===
The Cormac Reilly series comprising The Rúin, The Scholar, The Good Turn and The Unquiet Grave is set in Ireland, largely in the city of Galway, Ireland..

The Sisters and The Roommate are audio novella prequels to the Cormac series, set in Dublin, Ireland.

=== Books set in the United States of America ===
The Murder Rule is set in both Maine and Virginia, USA.

What Happened to Nina is set in Vermont, USA.

The Wrong One is set in Connecticut and New Jersey, USA.

=== Books set in Australia ===
Three Reasons for Revenge is set in Melbourne, Australia.

The Fireground is set in Western Australia.

== Reception ==
All of McTiernan's books have been widely and generally positively reviewed.

== Awards and recognition ==
Year	Work	Award		Result	Ref
2018	The Rúin	The Guardian's Not the Booker Prize		Shortlisted	
2019	The Rúin	Davitt Award		Won	
2019	The Rúin	Barry Award	best paperback book	Won	
2019	The Rúin	Ned Kelly Award	best first novel	Won	
2019	The Rúin	RUSA Reading List	Mystery	Shortlisted	
		The West Australian Premier's Book Award	Emerging Writer	Won	
		Australian Book Industry Awards	General Fiction Book of the Year	Shortlisted	
		Irish Book Awards	Crime Fiction Book of the Year	Shortlisted	
		Kate O'Brien Award		Shortlisted	
2020	The Scholar	International Thriller Writers Awards	Best Paperback Original Novel	Won	
2020	The Scholar	Davitt Award	best adult crime novel	Shortlisted	
2020	The Scholar	Ned Kelly Award	best crime fiction	Shortlisted	
2020	The Scholar	RUSA Reading List	Mystery	Shortlisted	
		Australian Book Industry Awards	General Fiction Book of the Year	Shortlisted	
2021	The Good Turn	Australian Book Industry Awards	General Fiction Book of the Year	Shortlisted	
2022	The Good Turn	Barry Award	Best Paperback Original	Won	
2025	What Happened to Nina	Australian Book Industry Awards	General Fiction Book of the Year	Won	
		International Thriller Writers Award	Best Standalone Mystery	Shortlisted	
		Crime Writers Association	Ian Fleming Steel Dagger	Longlisted	

== Adaptation ==
In 2019, it was reported that The Rúin was optioned for screen by Irish actor Colin Farrell and his production company. The Murder Rule and What Happened to Nina are currently in development for screen adaptation.

== Bibliography ==
- McTiernan, Dervla (2018), The Ruin (or The Rúin), HarperCollins Publishers Australia, ISBN 978-1-4607-5421-4
- McTiernan, Dervla (2019), The Scholar, HarperCollins, ISBN 978-1-4607-0868-2
- McTiernan, Dervla (2019), The Fireground, Audible Originals, ASIN B07W8XWK23
- McTiernan, Dervla (2020), The Good Turn, HarperCollins Publishers, ISBN 978-1-4607-1061-6
- McTiernan, Dervla (2020), The Roommate, Audible Originals, ASIN B0DV8Z1MHW
- McTiernan, Dervla (2022), The Murder Rule, HarperCollinsPublishers Australia Pty Limited, ISBN 978-1-4607-1354-9
- McTiernan, Dervla (2022), The Wrong One, Audible Originals, ASIN B09SHZHXWF
- McTiernan, Dervla (2023), The Fireground, Audible Originals, ASIN B0DM4MD3SC
- McTiernan, Dervla (2024), What Happened to Nina?, HarperCollins
- McTiernan, Dervla (2025), The Unquiet Grave, HarperCollins Australia Pty Limited, ISBN 978-1-4607-6682-8
- McTiernan, Dervla (2026), Three Reasons for Revenge, HarperCollins Australia Pty Limited, ISBN 978-1-4607-6016-1
