= A Room Called Earth =

2020 novel by Madeleine Ryan

- Author: Madeleine Ryan
- Language: English
- Publisher: Penguin Press; Scribe
- Publication date: 18 August 2020

A Room Called Earth is the debut novel by Australian author Madeleine Ryan. It was released on August 18, 2020 by Penguin Press in the US and in 2021 by Scribe in the UK and Commonwealth.

== Plot ==
A Room Called Earth follows a young woman over 24 hours as she attends a Christmas Eve eve party in Melbourne. She goes to the party alone, meets different people, and eventually makes a connection with a handsome architect, who she invites back to her mansion.

== Critical reception ==
A Room Called Earth was listed as "New and Noteworthy" in The New York Times and was selected in Bustle's "Top 20 Books of 2020".

The Independent praised the novel as "Extraordinary ... The dazzling directness of (Ryan's) prose opens thrilling new doors into the female experience of the sexual, spiritual and social worlds ... The smart, magical voice Madeleine Ryan has found in A Room Called Earth is unlike anything else you'll find this year."

The Sydney Morning Herald described it as "Visceral and voluptuous."

The Australian declared the novel "One of the most extraordinary books of the year ... An astonishing sensory experience."
