= Tara June Winch =

Australian writer

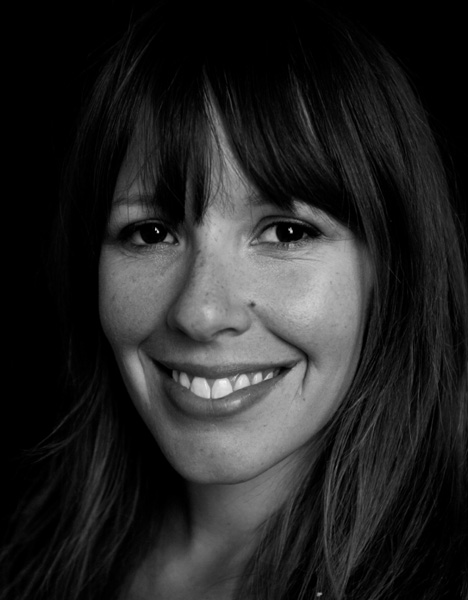
- Winch in 2008
- Born: December 2, 1983 (age 42); Wollongong, New South Wales, Australia
- Occupation: Writer
- Children: 1
- Writing career
- Notable awards: Miles Franklin Award (2020)
- Website: www.tarajunewinch.com

Tara June Winch (born 2 December 1983) is an Australian writer. She is the 2020 winner of the Miles Franklin Award for her book The Yield.

== Biography ==
Tara June Winch was born in Wollongong, New South Wales, Australia on 2 December 1983. Her father is from the Wiradjuri nation in western New South Wales, and she grew up in the coastal area of Woonona within the Wollongong region. She often explores the two geographical places in her fiction. She is based in Australia and France.

Her first novel, Swallow the Air (2006), won several Australian literary awards. The judges for The Sydney Morning Herald Best Young Novelists award wrote that the book "is distinguished by its natural grace and vivid language" and that "as with many first books it deals with issues of family, growing up and stepping into the world. But it strives to connect these experiences to broader social issues, though never in a didactic fashion".

In 2008 the Rolex Mentor and Protégé Arts Initiative supported her mentorship under Nobel Prize-winning author Wole Soyinka.

The critical reception for her second book, After the Carnage (2016), was positive. A review in The Australian stated that "Winch can pack a punch and break your heart within a few pages" and that "The personal-is-political worldview flexes Winch's considerable literary muscle".

Her 2019 novel The Yield won seven national Australian literary awards in 2020, including the Prime Minister's Literary Award for fiction and the Miles Franklin Literary Award.

== Awards and nominations ==
- 2003: State Library of Queensland Young Writers Award, Runner up and Maureen Donahoe Encouragement award
- 2004: Queensland Premier's Literary Awards, David Unaipon Award for unpublished Indigenous writers
- 2006: Victorian Premier's Literary Award for Indigenous Writing
- 2007: Dobbie Award
- 2007: New South Wales Premier's Literary Awards, UTS Award for New Writing
- 2007: The Sydney Morning Herald, Best Young Australian Novelists Award
- 2007: Queensland Premier's Literary Awards: Shortlisted
- 2007: The Age Book of the Year: Shortlisted
- 2008: Literature Recipient of the Rolex Mentor and Protégé Arts Initiative. Wole Soyinka was her mentor for this event.
- 2008: nominated for the Deadly Sounds Aboriginal and Torres Strait Islander Music, Sport, Entertainment and Community Awards – Outstanding Achievement in Literature.
- 2016: Victorian Premier's Literary Awards – "Highly commended"
- 2017: New South Wales Premier's Literary Awards Christina Stead Prize for Fiction – Shortlisted
- 2017: Queensland Literary Awards Short Story Collection – Shortlisted
- 2020: Victorian Premier's Prize for Fiction – Shortlisted for The Yield
- 2020: Stella Prize – Shortlisted for The Yield
- 2020: New South Wales Premier's Literary Awards Book of the Year, Christina Stead Prize for Fiction and People's Choice Award for The Yield
- 2020: Miles Franklin Award – Won for The Yield
- 2020: Queensland Literary Awards, Fiction Book Award – Shortlisted for The Yield
- 2020: Voss Literary Prize – Won for The Yield
- 2020: Prime Minister's Literary Award for Fiction – Won for The Yield
- 2022: Adelaide Festival Awards for Literature Fiction Award – Shortlisted for The Yield

== Bibliography ==
=== Books ===
- Winch, Tara June (2006). Swallow the Air. University of Queensland Press.
- — (2016). After the Carnage. University of Queensland Press.
- — (2019). The Yield. Hamish Hamilton, Penguin Books.

=== Anthologies ===
- Winch, Tara June (2005). "Cloud Busting". In Frank Moorhouse (ed.). Best Australian Stories. Black Inc.
- — (2006). "from Swallow the Air". MANOA: A Pacific Journal of International Writing. 18. University of Hawai'i.
- — (2008). "Cloud Busting". In Anita Heiss; Peter Minter (eds.). Macquarie PEN Anthology of Aboriginal Literature. Allen & Unwin.
- — (2012). "It's Too Difficult to Explain". McSweeney's 41. McSweeney's Publishing.
- — (2015). "Cloud Busting". Something Special, Something Rare: Outstanding Short Stories by Australian Women. Black Inc.

=== Selected essays and reporting ===
- Winch, Tara June (21–23 December 2007). "Summers Gone". Good Weekend Magazine. The Sydney Morning Herald. pp. 29–30, 33, 35.
- — (2007). "Mending a Broken Link". The Next Big Thing. Griffith Review.
- — (September 2013). "Skatestan". Vice.
- — (April 2013). "Long Way Home". Vogue Australia. pp. 46ff.
- — (2014). "Bringing up bilingual bébé". Perspectives. Meanjin. 73 (1): 12–14.
- — (2015). "Author". Motherhood and Creativity. Affirm Press: 25ff.
- — (2018). "First, Second, Third, Fourth". Growing Up Aboriginal in Australia. Carlton: Black Inc. pp. 282ff. ISBN 9781863959810.

=== Film ===
- Carriberrie (screenwriter) Winch, Tara June (2018)
