= Jessica Townsend =

Australian writer of children's fantasy novels

- Born: Jessica Townsend; April 18, 1985 (age 41); Caloundra, Queensland, Australia
- Writing career
- Language: English
- Years active: 2017–present
- Genres: Fantasy; Children's literature
- Notable work: The Nevermoor series

Jessica Townsend (born 18 April 1985 in Caloundra, Queensland) is an Australian author known for the children's fantasy novel series, The Nevermoor series.

Her debut novel Nevermoor: The Trials of Morrigan Crow won the Book of the Year Award at the Australian Book Industry Awards, and was shortlisted for the 2019 NSW Premier's Literary Awards' Patricia Wrightson Prize for Children's Literature. At the Adelaide Festival Awards for Literature, Nevermoor won both the Premier's Award for best overall published work and the Children's Award. It also won the 2018 Waterstones Children's Book Prize for Younger Fiction. Film rights to Nevermoor were sold to 20th Century Fox in 2016. Screenwriter Drew Goddard has been selected to adapt the screenplay.

== Biography ==
Jessica Townsend grew up in Queensland, Australia. She wrote her first story at the age of 7, and it was published in a local library newsletter. Townsend began writing what would become the first Nevermoor book the year she left high school. She worked as a copywriter for 8 years and at Steve Irwin's Australia Zoo for 5 years, including as an editor of its children's magazine Crikey! She moved to London at age 22 and has lived off and on in Queensland and London for the last 10 years. The sale of the Nevermoor books has allowed Townsend to become a full-time writer.

Nevermoor: The Trials of Morrigan Crow was Townsend's first novel. Interest in the publishing rights began at the 2016 Frankfurt Book Fair, and the rights were bid on by eight different publishing companies. Townsend chose to sell the rights to Hachette as part of a six-figure three-book contract. In 2019 the contract with Hachette was expanded for three more books. Townsend has stated that she has written plots for nine books in the series.

== Literary influences ==
Jessica Townsend has referenced several literary influences for her writing. Written influences include Little Women, which she's called her favorite book, The Baby-Sitters Club, His Dark Materials, Wicked, Tomorrow When the War Began, No Gun for Asmir, and the Harry Potter series. Her work has been compared to that of J. K. Rowling, and she has cited Rowling as a major influence, though she has also said that she is "just so gutted and so disappointed" by Rowling's anti-trans activism. Film influences include Willow and Return to Oz.

Critics have also noted similarities between the world of Nevermoor and contemporary London. In particular, Courage Square in the novels is inspired by Trafalgar Square and the Wunderground is inspired by the London Underground.

== Works ==
=== The Nevermoor series ===
- Nevermoor: The Trials of Morrigan Crow (2017)
- Wundersmith: The Calling of Morrigan Crow (2018)
- Hollowpox: The Hunt for Morrigan Crow (2020)
- Silverborn: The Mystery of Morrigan Crow (2025)
