= The Yield =

2019 novel by Tara June Winch

- First edition
- Author: Tara June Winch
- Language: English
- Publisher: Hamish Hamilton, Penguin Random House Australia
- Publication date: 2019
- Publication place: Australia
- Pages: 352 pp
- Awards: Miles Franklin Award 2020; Prime Minister's Literary Award 2020
- ISBN: 9781760143671
- Preceded by: After the Carnage
- Followed by: -

The Yield is a 2019 novel by Aboriginal Australian author Tara June Winch. The novel follows a Wiradjuri woman returning home to Australia amidst a family tragedy. Winch won the 2020 Miles Franklin Award for this book. The book also won the 2020 Voss Literary Prize and the 2020 Prime Minister's Literary Award for fiction.

== Synopsis ==
The novel follows the story of a young Wiradjuri woman returning home to Australia from the United Kingdom to attend a funeral, and finding her ancestral lands threatened by mining. The novel explores language and features a Wiradjuri language dictionary, as well as themes of colonialism, environmental issues and intergenerational trauma.

== Dedication ==
- Dedication: For my family.
- Epigraph: "In the absence of justice, what is sovereignty but organised robbery?" – Saint Augustine

== Publishing history ==
The novel was translated into French in 2020, Dutch in 2021, German in 2022, and Polish in 2023. After the novel's initial publication by Hamish Hamilton in Australia in 2019, the book was reprinted in the US (HarperVia, 2020), UK (HarperVia, 2021), and Australia (Penguin, 2021).

== Critical reception ==
Writing in the Australian Book Review, Ellen van Neerven commented: "The Yield is about regaining more than language. There are odes to Bruce Pascoe's Dark Emu, with the pointed inclusions of bush food, bread, and fishing technology. There are only a few places where Winch’s delivery is too didactic, as when Nana tells August, the author speaking directly down the barrel to the reader, ‘we aren’t victims in this story anymore – don't you see that?'." And she concluded: "The Yield will appeal to many because of the way it unpacks complex themes in an accessible way. Australian rural novels are often humourless sketches with characters more like caricatures, grimly serious or full of despair. Refreshingly, the characters in The Yield are capable of communion, humour, and dignity despite tragedy, sexual violence, and substance abuse. In this deft novel of slow-moving water, they are borne by love, not pity."

In The Guardian Erica Wagner noted: "In Wiradjuri the word for 'yield' is baayanha. But as the reader learns throughout this book, translation is far from simple. 'Yield in English is the reaping, the things that man can take from the land, the thing he's waited for and gets to claim,' Poppy Gondiwindi writes. In Wiradjuri, 'it's the things you give to, the movement, the space between things'. This is a novel full of the spaces in between...This is a complex, satisfying book, both story and testimony. The Yield works to reclaim a history that never should have been lost in the first place."

== Awards ==
Year	Award	Category	Result	Ref
2020	ALS Gold Medal	—	Longlisted	
2020	ARA Historical Novel Prize	Adult	Longlisted	
2020	Australian Book Industry Awards	Literary Fiction	Shortlisted	
2020	Australian Book Industry Awards	Audiobook	Shortlisted	
2020	Barbara Jefferis Award	—	Shortlisted	
2020	Indie Book Award	Fiction	Longlisted	
2020	Margaret and Colin Roderick Literary Award	—	Longlisted	
2020	Miles Franklin Award	—	Won	
2020	New South Wales Premier's Literary Award	Christina Stead Prize for Fiction	Won	
2020	Prime Minister's Literary Award	Fiction	Won	
2020	Queensland Literary Awards	Fiction	Shortlisted	
2020	Reading Women Award	Fiction	Shortlisted	
2020	Stella Prize	—	Shortlisted	
2020	Victorian Premier's Literary Award	Fiction	Shortlisted	
2020	Voss Literary Prize	—	Won	
2021	International Dublin Literary Award	—	Longlisted	
2022	South Australian Literary Awards	Fiction	Won	
