= The Scholar (novel) =

2019 crime novel by Dervla McTiernan

- Author: Dervla McTiernan
- Series: Cormac Reilly
- Genre: crime fiction
- Publisher: HarperCollins
- Publication date: 2019
- ISBN: 9781460755419
- Preceded by: The Rúin
- Followed by: The Good Turn

The Scholar is a 2019 crime novel by Irish-Australian writer Dervla McTiernan. It is the second installment in the Cormac Reilly series of novels, following The Rúin and preceding The Good Turn.

== Plot ==
In Galway, Detective Sergeant Cormac Reilly investigates the death of a young woman murdered in a hit-and-run.

== Publication and awards ==
The Scholar won the 2020 International Thriller Award for Best Paperback Original Novel.

The novel was shortlisted for the 2020 Davitt Award for Best Adult Novel, and won the Readers Choice Davitt Award in the same year.

It was also shortlisted for the 2020 Ned Kelly Award for Best Novel.
