= Anemone Is Not the Enemy =

2020 Children's picture book by Anna McGregor

- Author: Anna McGregor
- Illustrator: Anna McGregor
- Language: English
- Genre: Children's picture book
- Published: 2020 (Scribble)
- Publication place: Australia
- Media type: Print (hardback)
- Pages: 32 (unpaginated)
- ISBN: 9781922310118
- OCLC: 1200259215

Anemone Is Not the Enemy is a 2020 children's picture book by Anna McGregor. It is about a lonely sea anemone who lives in a tide pool and cannot make friends as she keeps stinging everyone, but eventually does so with a clown fish.

== Publication history ==
- 2021, USA, Scribe ISBN 9781950354511
- 2020, Australia, Scribble ISBN 9781922310118

== Reception ==
A reviewer for Reading Time called it a "fun and funny picture book", and recommended it "for young readers especially those interested in the natural world.". Kirkus Reviews found that it "Suggests a human lesson from a fish fact made familiar by a popular children’s film."

Anemone Is Not the Enemy has also been reviewed by The Bulletin of the Center for Children's Books, Books+Publishing, and Publishers Weekly.

It is a 2021 CBCA Book of the Year Early Childhood notable book, and a 2021 Australian Book Industry Awards Small publisher Children's Book of the Year longlisted book.
