= Dennis Glover =

Australian writer

Dennis Glover is an Australian writer who has written three novels, The Last Man in Europe (2017), Thaw and Factory 19. He was formerly a speechwriter.
