= The Rúin =

2018 crime novel by Irish/Australian writer Dervla McTiernan

- Author: Dervla McTiernan
- Language: English
- Genre: Fiction
- Publisher: HarperCollins
- Publication date: 19 February 2018
- Publication place: Australia
- Media type: Print
- Pages: 400 pp.
- Awards: Davitt Award — Best Adult Crime Novel 2019; Ned Kelly Award – Best First Novel 2019; Barry Award – Best Paperback Original 2019
- ISBN: 9781460754214
- Preceded by: -
- Followed by: The Scholar

The Rúin (2018) is the debut crime novel by Irish/Australian writer Dervla McTiernan. It was originally published by HarperCollins in Australia in 2018.

It is the first in the author's Cormac Reilly series of novels, later following by The Scholar and The Good Turn.

== Synopsis ==
Twenty years ago, young policeman Cormac Reilly finds two young children sitting on the steps of a decrepit house, with their mother dead upstairs. Now the young boy, Jack, has been found dead in Dublin and Reilly is drawn back into the investigation.

== Publishing history ==
After its initial publication in Australia by HarperCollins in 2018, the novel was reprinted as follows:

- Penguin Books, USA, 2018
- Little, Brown, UK, 2018

The novel was also translated into German, Swedish, and Czech in 2019.

== Critical reception ==
A reviewer in The Telegraph (UK), noted: "This unsettling small-town noir draws us deep into the dark heart of Ireland, where corruption, desperation, and crime run rife. A gritty look at trust and betrayal where the written law isn't the only one, The Ruin asks who will protect you when the authorities can't-or won't."

Writing in The Guardian, Sam Jordinson thought the powerful opening was let down somewhat by the rest of the novel: "Too many of the plot's mechanics feel equally clunky...There’s still enough sympathetic writing and talent on display to make you stick with The Ruin, but in the end it feels frustrating and unsatisfying. It turns out that that 'what happened next' wasn't quite as intriguing as that powerful opening."

== Awards ==
- Davitt Award – Best Adult Crime Novel, 2019, winner
- Ned Kelly Award – Best First Novel, 2019, winner
- Barry Award – Best Paperback Original, 2019, winner

== Adaptation ==
In August 2019, it was announced that Hopscotch Features had been joined by Irish actor Colin Farrell's production company, Chapel Place Productions, to produce an adaptation of The Rúin. This will be the first production for the company. The producer is expected to be Lee Madigay, who produced The Favourite.

== See also ==
- 2018 in Australian literature
