= Hollowpox: The Hunt for Morrigan Crow =

2020 novel by Jessica Townsend

Hollowpox
- First edition (Australia)
- Author: Jessica Townsend
- Cover artist: Jim Madsen
- Language: English
- Series: The Nevermoor series
- Genre: Fantasy
- Publisher: Hachette Books
- Publication date: September 29, 2020 (AUS); October 15, 2020 (UK); October 27, 2020 (US)
- Publication place: Australia
- Media type: Print (Paperback and Hardback)
- Pages: 560
- Awards: Waterstones Children's Book Prize
- Preceded by: Wundersmith: The Calling of Morrigan Crow
- Followed by: Silverborn: The Mystery of Morrigan Crow

Hollowpox: The Hunt for Morrigan Crow is a 2020 novel written by Jessica Townsend and published by Little, Brown and Company. It is the third installment in The Nevermoor series and was released on September 29 in Australia, October 15 in the United Kingdom, and October 27 in the United States. The book was followed by a sequel, entitled Silverborn: The Mystery of Morrigan Crow. which released in Australia and New Zealand on April 30, 2025. UK Release — May 8, 2025. US Release - June 24, 2025. The book follows Morrigan Crow, who was cursed after being born on Eventide day, and was supposed to die on her eleventh birthday, but is saved by the mysterious Jupiter North and taken to the wonderful city of Nevermoor. In Hollowpox, Morrigan continues her adventure and must control her Wundersmith powers that threaten to destroy her.

== Characters ==
- Morrigan Crow: a young girl who was saved from her terrible fate on Eventide by Jupiter North. She is also a Wundersmith, someone with the knack of shaping and controlling the fantasy energy source of wunder.
- Jupiter North: the patron of Morrigan Crow. He is the owner of the Hotel Deucalion, a member of the Wundrous Society along with the adjacent League of Explorers. He has the knack of a 'Witness', with the ability to see physical representations of a person's thoughts, feelings and memories by looking at them.
- Hawthorne Swift: Morrigan's closest friend who has a knack for dragon riding and is also a member of Unit 919 in the Wundrous Society.
- Marina Cheery: the conductor of Unit 919's home train to and from the Wundrous Society campus. She is friends with Roshni Singh, a librarian at the Gobleian Library.
- Rook: the Scholar Mistress of the School of Wundrous Arts She has the knack of changing her physical appearance and personality, and thus is also Ms Dearborn and Ms Murgatroyd at the same time.
- Sofia and Conall O'Leary: members of the School of Wundrous Arts. They are two of approximately fifteen students of the Wundrous Arts at the Wunsoc campus, but there are many others spread throughout the Free State. Sofia is a Foxwun Major with an unknown knack, while Conall has the knack of clairvoyance.
- Ezra Squall: the only other living Wundersmith aside from Morrigan, and exiled to the Wintersea Republic for the Courage Square Massacre a hundred years before the events of the series. Throughout the series he attempts to make Morrigan his apprentice, eventually succeeding in Hollowpox.
- Fenestra: a giant cat, called a Magnificat, that serves as the head of housekeeping in the Hotel Deucalion. Fen, as she is called, has a short temper and often leaves fishes and rodents in peoples' beds when she is displeased with them. Morrigan encountered Magnificats in the Wintersea Republic, where she grew up, but has never known they could talk.
- Unit 919: One of the youngest units of the Wundrous Society. Besides the seven following, Morrigan and Hawthorne are also members.
  - Francis John Fitzwilliam: a gastronomist and cook with the ability to induce emotions through the dishes he creates.
  - Mahir Ibrahim: a linguist fluent in 41 different languages.
  - Thaddea Millicent Macleod: a skilled fighter.
  - Lambeth Amara (or Princess Lamya Bethari Amati Ra): a "short-range" oracle.
  - Anah Kahlo: a talented student doctor.
  - Cadence Lenore Blackburn: a mesmerist with the knack of mind control. Her power inadvertently makes other people forget who she is; only Morrigan is immune to this effect.
  - Archan Tate: an expert pickpocket and player of the violin.

== Plot ==
On the last day of their first year in the Wundrous Society, the members of Unit 919 take part in a class called Containment & Distraction, as an introduction to the harder class they will have to take the following year. Later, at a Wundrous Society meeting, one man asks for volunteers to lower the population of the Nevermoorian Scaly Sewer Beast, a species that dwells in Nevermoor and is approaching its breeding season. Thaddea volunteers for the task force, much to everyone else's surprise, and the leader of the group, Gavin Squires, and Holliday Wu from the Public Distraction Department, try to brainstorm ideas for ways to distract the non-Wundrous Society citizens of Nevermoor from the hunt for the beast so as not to cause a panic. Meanwhile, after returning to the Hotel Deucalion, Jupiter bakes her an intricate cake to apologise for not being able to tell her about Containment & Distraction and notes that they are approaching Christmas. Later, at the Christmas parade, Morrigan sees Hawthorne, and afterwards the two—along with Hawthorne's family—go home on the Wunderground, on which Hawthorne's toddler sister, Baby Dave, causes trouble, and is attacked by a leopard Wunimal, called a Leopardwun. Fenestra picks Morrigan up and she senses her acting unusually. At a Christmas dinner, Dame Chanda Kali reveals that her favorite fashion designer was a Wunimal who looked similar, and the hotel staff–Morrigan included—begin to worry. Later, during her first day of school of the New Year, a new teacher, Rosenfeld, confronts Morrigan and takes her to the School of Wundrous Arts, where anyone can train in skills like Professor Onstald's to stop time, and learn about Wundersmiths.

Morrigan meets researchers Conall and Sofia, a fox-wunimal (foxwun), who are both part of the 'Sub Nine' group researching Wundersmiths and the Wundrous arts. Later, Morrigan is threatened by a rabid Bearwun, Brutilus Brown, and Dame Chanda Kali is attacked by a Horsewun actor during a performance at the Nevermoor Opera House. Morrigan keeps noticing a strange green light in the Wunimals' eyes as they become aggressive and unresponsive. Dame Chanda explains that only a few decades ago, Wunimals were treated as less than human, as if they had the intelligence of a common house pet. In the Wundrous Society, Wunimals are warned of the virus that infects only them, causing them to act aggressively and become catatonic and "hollow," which is dubbed the "Hollowpox." As the cases and the attacks increase, Jupiter and Jack are put to work using their Witness powers to find infected Wunimals. Meanwhile, Unit 919 is forced to continue classes, with Morrigan retreating more and more often to the School of Wundrous Arts, where she is introduced to The Book of Ghostly Hours, a guide to known 'ghostly hours', where she can relive experiences and lessons of Wundersmiths of the past. These experiences confirm to her that they really weren't all evil. Unit 919's disruption and distraction classes, including What's That Behind You? and What's That Smell?, have been happening more frequently, and Morrigan later competes in a challenge in the class where they must go out into the city, and a) cause a panic, b) steal something, and c) don't get caught. While scoping out a pawn shop, Morrigan's team overhears the proprietor trying to sell a mysterious one-person vessel, which they eventually puzzle out must be a submarine.

The Wundrous Society, responding to an escalation in the Hollowpox crisis, gives all junior society members a day off classes. Miss Cheery suggests that Unit 919 visit the Gobleiean Library, a giant library hidden in a pocket dimension, where her friend (and onetime girlfriend) Roshni Singh works.

While there, Morrigan plots to steal the first volume in the book series that Onstald rewrote and bowlderised, realising that the unabridged version of the text is favorable to Wundersmiths. Morrigan and the others are attacked by bookbugs that have emerged from a book, and while an elite team deals with them, Wunimal Colin becomes infected with Hollowpox. The children escape, but the librarian Roshni is seriously injured. Laurent St James, an anti-Wunimal rights senator, begins pounding the Wunimals in the press, saying they should be locked up together or banned from city establishment, much to Morrigan, Jupiter, and the rest of the Hotel Deucalion staff's horror. When Morrigan accidentally reveals her Wundersmith abilities to the non-Wundrous Society public, St James switches to her, provoking newspapers to claim that she is not an actual Wundersmith, and offers a large reward to anybody who can photograph her using her abilities. This leads Morrigan to spend more time in the School of Wundrous Arts, where she practices the Wundrous Art of the Inferno, and subsequently meets with The Kindling, a Wundrous deity, who dubs her a master of the art. Upon returning to the school on level Sub-Nine of Wunsoc campus, Morrigan stumbles across her friend Sofia, the fox-wun, who has become infected by Hollowpox and attacks her. When Fenestra reveals that she harbors Wunimals from the Wintersea Republic, Morrigan's home state, where they don't have rights, Morrigan begins to theorize that that is how the Hollowpox crossed the border into Nevermoor. Fenestra denies it, citing her organisation's strict quarantine practices. Morrigan attempted to travel to the Wintersea Republic through the Gossamer to ask Nevermoor's nemesis Ezra Squall for help to cure the Hollowpox, but instead is brought to President Wintersea, whose real name is Maud Lowry.

Lowry admits that her state has developed a Hollowpox cure, and promises Morrigan that she will try to distribute the cure across Nevermoor and the Free State, if Morrigan can persuade the Nevermoorian prime minister Gideon Steed to meet with her. Morrigan decides to visit Crow Manor, her old house. She sees her baby half-brothers, Guntram and Wolfram, for the first time and notices her beloved old stuffed rabbit, Emmett, dusty and neglected on their windowsill. She returns to the Hotel Deucalion in a state of distress, telling Jupiter everything. He warns her that what she has done could be considered treason, but agrees to try and persuade Prime Minister Gideon Steed to meet with President Wintersea/Lowry. Ezra Squall, the notorious Wundersmith whose atrocities turned public opinion against all Wundersmiths and saw him banished from Nevermoor, comes to her 'virtually' on the Gossamer to warn her that she must not allow President Wintersea across the border. He explains that, though he wants nothing more than to return to Nevermoor, he would sacrifice his chance to do so to keep Wintersea out of it. He also reveals that Wintersea/Lowry actually commissioned him to create Hollowpox. He helps Morrigan eradicate the virus, and she almost dies due to exertion and the fact that multiple infected Wunimals converge on her in the moment. Morrigan wakes up two days later in the hospital, with everyone she cares about by her side, including Hawthorne, Cadence, Fenestra, and Jupiter. When she learns that more Wunimals are waking up as unnimals (normal, non-sentient animals), some are waking up as themselves, and some aren't waking up at all, she calls Squall to her. Squall tells her that there is no way to get the Wunimals back, but she refuses to believe him, and instead demands that he unmake the Hollowpox, as he was the one that made it. In exchange, she will become his apprentice. Squall agrees, unmaking the Hollowpox. And Morrigan agrees to become his apprentice, eager to learn more about the Wundrous arts, signing a contract binding her to become Squall's student. Finally, she returns home to the Hotel Deucalion and rests.

== Development ==
Hollowpox: The Hunt for Morrigan Crow was published in September and October 2020, in Australia, the United Kingdom, and the United States, respectively. Originally, the book had an early 2020 release schedule planned out, but the publication date was pushed back to July and August 2020, due to the COVID-19 pandemic. Finally, the release was pushed back once again to September/October 2020, which is when the book was actually published. Hollowpox is 560 pages long, making it the longest book in The Nevermoor series so far.

== Reception ==
=== Reviews ===
The book review site Better Reading said that Hollowpox: The Hunt for Morrigan Crow was "a fast-paced thriller that presents moral dilemmas and raises questions about personal and societal ethics" and it was the "darkest" of the three books currently released in the series. MuggleNet called Townsend's imagination "boundless" and "Wundrous" in addition to saying that the main protagonist, Morrigan Crow, was "at times timid, at times powerful, and always hungry for both affection and learning." BookTopia noted that the writing style and plot were both "so much fun" to read and the "many surprise reveals and unexpected turns" greatly enhanced the story. "This is such an engaging and magical series, on par with other fantastic reads, like Harry Potter," said Olivia Farr of Books Central in a review, comparing the book to the works of J. K. Rowling. Another book-review site has called Hollowpox "charming and unapologetically whimsical."

=== Awards ===
Hollowpox: The Hunt for Morrigan Crow is the winner of the Waterstones Children's Book Prize in 2020 and was shortlisted for the 2021 Australian Book Industry Awards, Book of the year for younger children (ages 7–12).

== Sequels ==
The book is the third installment in The Nevermoor series. The fourth book in the series, Silverborn: The Mystery of Morrigan Crow, was published in Australia on April 30, 2025 after being delayed multiple times. In May 2019, fifth and sixth installments in the series were officially announced by Hachette Book Group. On the topic, Townsend said, "I'm thrilled to be growing and deepening this series, and can't wait to tell Morrigan Crow's next three stories after Hollowpox." In an interview, Townsend also revealed that she has plots planned out for three more books after the first six that have been announced officially.
