= Daniel Davis Wood =

Australian novelist

Daniel Davis Wood (born 21 July 1983) is an Australian author who is known for the novels Blood and Bone and At the Edge of the Solid World.

== Life and career ==
Davis Wood spent his early life in Sydney and Nelson Bay. He was educated at Tomaree High School and Merewether High School. He attended the University of Sydney and Northeastern University and completed a PhD at the University of Melbourne.

His first novel, Blood and Bone, was published in 2014 and received the Viva La Novella Prize.

In 2020, his second novel, At the Edge of the Solid World, was published. The book has been reviewed by the Australian Book Review and the Sydney Review of Books as well as other Australian national media. In 2021, the book was shortlisted for the Miles Franklin Award.

Davis Wood's third novel, In Ruins, was published in 2021.

Daniel now lives in Scotland with his wife and daughter.

== Bibliography ==
=== Novels ===
- Blood and Bone. 2014.
- At the Edge of the Solid World. 2020.
- In Ruins. 2021.

=== Short fiction ===
- Unspeakable. Splice. 2020.

=== Non-fiction ===
- Frontier justice in the novels of James Fenimore Cooper and Cormac McCarthy. Newcastle upon Tyne: Cambridge Scholars Publishing. 2016.

=== Critical studies and reviews of Davis Wood's work ===
- Goldsworthy, Kerryn (13 November 2020). "An intense journey into the depths of grief". Sydney Morning Herald.
- Grey-Smith, Naama (January–February 2021). "'The truth was more complex' : a finely honed novel tests limits". Australian Book Review. 428: 46–47.
- L'Estrange, Sarah (18 June 2021). "Miles Franklin Literary Award 2021 shortlist reading guide". ABC Arts.
- Matthews, Peter D. (18 May 2022). "A 'Catastrophe of Agglomeration'". Westerly.
- Novitz, Julian (30 September 2021). "Irreconcilable Losses". Sydney Review of Books.
- Silcox, Beejay (9 January 2021). "Intricate study of grief". The Australian.
- Sparrow, Jeff (16 October 2020). "At the Edge of the Solid World". The Saturday Paper. 322.
- Webb, Jen (14 July 2021). "The saddest of stories, beautifully told". The Guardian.
