= Precursor T-lymphoblastic lymphoma =

- Specialty: Oncology

Precursor T-lymphoblastic lymphoma is a type of non-Hodgkin lymphoma in which too many T-cell lymphoblasts (immature white blood cells) are found in the lymph nodes and spleen. Also called T-lymphoblastic lymphoma, it is most common in young men.

== Epidemiology ==
Of all cancers involving the same class of blood cell, 2% of cases are precursor T lymphoblastic.
