= 2023 in Australian literature =

This is a list of historical events and publications of Australian literature during 2023.

== Events ==
- July: Publisher Hachette Australia withdraws from publication the book titled Special Operations Group by Christophe Glasl after Victoria Police expressed concerns about the accuracy of the book
- December: Yumna Kassab is announced as inaugural Parramatta Laureate of Literature for 2024

== Major publications ==
=== Literary fiction ===
- Hossein Asgari – Only Sound Remains
- Tony Birch – Women & Children
- Katherine Brabon – Body Friend
- Jen Craig – Wall
- Lauren Aimee Curtis – Strangers in the Port
- Trent Dalton – Lola in the Mirror
- André Dao – Anam
- Gregory Day – The Bell of the World
- Ali Cobby Eckermann – She Is the Earth (verse novel)
- Lexi Freiman – The Book of Ayn
- Madeleine Gray – Green Dot
- Kate Grenville – Restless Dolly Maunder
- John Kinsella – Cellnight: A verse novel
- Melissa Lucashenko – Edenglassie
- Kate Morton – Homecoming
- Genevieve Novak – Crushing
- Emily O'Grady – Feast
- Angela O'Keeffe – The Sitter
- Mirandi Riwoe – Sunbirds
- Sanya Rushdi – Hospital
- Kate Scott – Compulsion
- Tracy Sorensen – The Vitals
- Lucy Treloar – Days of Innocence and Wonder
- Christos Tsiolkas – The In-Between
- Pip Williams – The Bookbinder of Jericho
- Charlotte Wood – Stone Yard Devotional
- Alexis Wright – Praiseworthy

=== Children's and Young Adult fiction ===
- Melissa Kang & Yumi Stynes – Welcome to Sex, illustrated by Jenny Latham
- Will Kostakis – We Could Be Something
- Alice Pung – Millie Mak the Maker, illustrated by Sher Rill Ng
- Lili Wilkinson – A Hunger of Thorns
- Dianne Wolfer – Scout and the Rescue Dogs

=== Short story collections ===
- J. M. Coetzee – The Pole and Other Stories
- Laura Jean McKay – Gunflower
- Graeme Simsion – Creative Differences: And Other Stories

=== Crime and mystery ===
- Tim Ayliffe – Killer Traitor Spy
- Ashley Kalagian Blunt – Dark Mode
- Shelley Burr – Ripper
- Candice Fox – Fire With Fire
- Megan Goldin – Dark Corners
- Chris Hammer – The Seven
- Amanda Hampson – The Tea Ladies
- Sally Hepworth – Darling Girls
- Fiona McIntosh – Dead Tide
- Benjamin Stevenson – Everyone on this train is a suspect
- Chris Womersley – Ordinary Gods and Monsters

=== Science fiction and fantasy ===
- Greg Egan
  - "Didicosm"
  - Phoresis and Other Journeys
  - Scale
  - Sleep and the Soul
- James Islington – The Will of the Many
- Shelley Parker-Chan – He Who Drowned the World

=== Poetry ===
- Stuart Barnes – Like to the Lark
- Amy Crutchfield – The Cyprian
- Dan Hogan – Secret Third Thing
- John Kinsella – Harsh Hakea: Collected Poems Volume Two (2005–2014)
- David McCooey – The Book of Falling
- Jennifer Maiden – Golden Bridge: New Poems
- Pi O – The Tour
- Sara M. Saleh – The Flirtation of Girls
- Tais Rose Wae – Riverbed Sky Songs
- Grace Yee – Chinese Fish

=== Non-Fiction ===
- Katie Ariel – The Swift Dark Tide
- Chanel Contos – Consent Laid Bare
- Robyn Davidson – Unfinished Woman
- Marele Day – Reckless
- Martin Flanagan – The Empty Honour Board
- Clementine Ford – I Don't
- Anna Funder – Wifedom: Mrs Orwell's Invisible Life
- Michael Gawenda – My Life as a Jew
- Stan Grant – The Queen is Dead: The Time has Come for a Reckoning
- Susan Johnson – Aphrodite's Breath
- Christine Kenneally – Ghosts of the Orphanage
- Sarah Krasnostein – On Peter Carey
- David Marr – Killing for Country: A Family Story
- Ross McMullin – Life So Full of Promise
- Alex Miller – A Kind of Confession: The Writer's Private World
- Matt Preston – Big Mouth
- Alecia Simmonds – Courting: An Intimate History of Love and the Law
- Margaret Simons – Tanya Plibersek: On Her Own Terms
- Christine Wallace – Political Lives: Australian Prime Ministers and Their Biographers

=== Drama ===
- Nicholas Brown – Sex Magick
- Joanna Murray-Smith – Julia

== Awards and honours ==
Note: these awards were presented in the year in question.

=== Lifetime achievement ===
Award	Author
Patrick White Award	Alex Skovron

=== Literary ===
Award	Author	Title	Publisher
ALS Gold Medal	Debra Dank	We Come With This Place	Echo Publishing
Colin Roderick Award	Sarah Holland-Batt	The Jaguar	University of Queensland Press
Indie Book Awards Book of the Year	Craig Silvey	Runt	Allen & Unwin
New South Wales Premier's Literary Awards	Debra Dank	We Come With This Place	Echo Publishing
Stella Prize	Sarah Holland-Batt	The Jaguar	University of Queensland Press
Victorian Premier's Literary Awards	Jessica Au	Cold Enough for Snow	Giramondo Publishing

=== Fiction ===
Award	Author	Title	Publisher
Adelaide Festival Awards for Literature	Not awarded		
The Age Book of the Year	Robbie Arnott	Limberlost	Text Publishing
ARA Historical Novel Prize	Gail Jones	Salonika Burning	Text Publishing
The Australian/Vogel Literary Award	Anna McGahan	Immaculate	Allen & Unwin
Barbara Jefferis Award	Not awarded		
Indie Book Awards Book of the Year – Fiction	Geraldine Brooks	Horse	Viking Books
Indie Book Awards Book of the Year – Debut Fiction	Tracey Lien	All That's Left Unsaid	HQ Fiction
Miles Franklin Award	Shankari Chandran	Chai Time at Cinnamon Gardens	Ultimo Press
Prime Minister's Literary Awards	Jessica Au	Cold Enough for Snow	Giramondo
New South Wales Premier's Literary Awards	Katerina GIbson	Women I Know	Scribner
Queensland Literary Awards	Alexis Wright	Praiseworthy	Giramondo
Victorian Premier's Literary Awards	Jessica Au	Cold Enough for Snow	Giramondo
Voss Literary Prize	Robbie Arnott	Limberlost	Text Publishing

=== Children and Young Adult ===
Award	Category	Author	Title	Publisher
ARA Historical Novel Prize	Children and Young Adult	Amelia Mellor	The Bookseller’s Apprentice	Affirm Press
Children's Book of the Year Award	Older Readers	Tom Taylor	Neverlanders	Penguin Random House
Children's Book of the Year Award	Younger Readers	Craig Silvey	Runt	Allen & Unwin
Children's Book of the Year Award	Picture Book	Zeno Sworder	My Strange Shrinking Parents	Thames & Hudson
Children's Book of the Year Award	Early Childhood	Vikki Conley, illus. Max Hamilton	Where the Lyrebird Lives	Windy Hollow
Children's Book of the Year Award	Eve Pownall Award for Information Books	Jess McGeachin	DEEP: Delve into hidden words	Welbeck Publishing
Indie Book Awards Book of the Year	Children's	Craig Silvey	Runt	Allen & Unwin
Indie Book Awards Book of the Year	Young Adult	Holden Shepherd	The Brink	Text Publishing
Prime Minister's Literary Awards	Children's	Jasmine Seymour	Open Your Heart to Country	Magabala Books
Prime Minister's Literary Awards	Young Adult	Sarah Winifred Searle	The Greatest Thing	Allen & Unwin
New South Wales Premier's Literary Awards	Children's	Corey Tutt and Blak Douglas	The First Scientists	Hardie Grant
New South Wales Premier's Literary Awards	Young People's	Lystra Rose	The Upwelling	Hachette
Queensland Literary Awards	Children's	Katrina Nannestad	Waiting for the Storks	ABC Books
Queensland Literary Awards	Young Adult	Biffy James	Completely Normal (and Other Lies)	Hardie Grant
Victorian Premier's Literary Awards	Young Adult Fiction	Kate Murray	We Who Hunt the Hollow	Hardie Grant

=== Crime and Mystery ===
==== National ====
Award	Category	Author	Title	Publisher
Davitt Award	Novel	Tracey Lien	All That’s Left Unsaid	HQ Fiction
Davitt Award	Young adult novel	Fleur Ferris	Seven Days	Puffin
Davitt Award	Children's novel	Charlie Archbold	The Sugarcane Kids and the Red-Bottomed Boat	Text Publishing
Davitt Award	Non-fiction	Megan Norris	Out of the Ashes	Simon and Schuster Australia
Davitt Award	Debut	Hayley Scrivenor	Dirt Town	Pan Macmillan
Davitt Award	Readers' choice	Vikki Petraitis	The Unbelieved	Allen & Unwin
Ned Kelly Award	Novel	Jane Harper	Exiles	Pan Macmillan
Ned Kelly Award	First novel	Shelley Burr	Wake	Hachette Australia
Ned Kelly Award	True crime	Sandi Logan	Betrayed	Hachette Australia

=== Poetry ===
Award	Author	Title	Publisher
Adelaide Festival Awards for Literature	Not awarded		
Anne Elder Award(joint winners)	Harry Reid	Leave Me Alone	Cordite
Anne Elder Award(joint winners)	Theodore Ell	Beginning In Sight	RWP
Mary Gilmore Award	Harry Reid	Leave Me Alone	Cordite
Prime Minister's Literary Awards	Gavin Yuan Gao	At the Altar of Touch	UQP
New South Wales Premier's Literary Awards	Kim Cheng Boey	The Singer and Other Poems	Cordite
Judith Wright Calanthe Award for a Poetry Collection	Lionel Fogarty	Harvest Lingo	Giramondo
Victorian Premier's Literary Awards	Gavin Yuan Gao	At the Altar of Touch	UQP

=== Drama ===
Award	Category	Author	Title	Publisher
New South Wales Premier's Literary Awards	Script	Del Kathryn Barton and Huna Amweero	Blaze	Causeway Films
New South Wales Premier's Literary Awards	Play	Dylan Van Den Berg	Whitefella Yella Tree	Griffin Theatre Company & Currency Press
Victorian Premier's Literary Awards		John Harvey	The Return	Malthouse Theatre
Patrick White Playwrights' Award	Award	Wendy Mocke	Realish	Melbourne Theatre Company
Patrick White Playwrights' Award	Fellowship	Wesley Enoch		

=== Non-Fiction ===
Award	Category	Author	Title	Publisher
Adelaide Festival Awards for Literature	Non-Fiction	Not awarded		
The Age Book of the Year	Non-Fiction	Kim Mahood	Wandering With Intent	Scribe
Indie Book Awards Book of the Year	Non-Fiction	Richard Fidler	The Book of Roads And Kingdoms	ABC Books
Indie Book Awards Book of the Year	Illustrated Non-Fiction	Damien Coulthard and Rebecca Sullivan	First Nations Food Companion	Murdoch Books
National Biography Award	Biography	Ann-Marie Priest	My Tongue Is My Own: A Life of Gwen Harwood	La Trobe University Press / Black Inc.
Prime Minister's Literary Awards	Non-Fiction	Sam Vincent	My Father and Other Animals	Black Inc.
New South Wales Premier's Literary Awards	Non-Fiction	Debra Dank	We Come With This Place	Echo Publishing
New South Wales Premier's History Awards	Australian History	Alan Atkinson	Elizabeth and John: The Macarthurs of Elizabeth Farm	NewSouth
New South Wales Premier's History Awards	Community and Regional History	Ian Hodges	He Belonged to Wagga: The Great War, the AIF and returned soldiers in an Australian country town	ASP
New South Wales Premier's History Awards	General History	Michael Laffan	Under Empire: Muslim lives and loyalties across the Indian Ocean world, 1775–1945	Columbia University
Queensland Literary Awards	Non-Fiction	Debra Dank	We Come With This Place	Echo Publishing
Victorian Premier's Literary Awards	Non-Fiction	Eda Gunaydin	Root & Branch: Essays on inheritance	NewSouth

== Deaths ==
- 21 January – Gabrielle Williams, author of young adult fiction (born 1963)
- 3 February – Portia Robinson, historian (born 1926)
- 19 April – Lee Harding, novelist (born 1937)
- 21 April – John Tranter, poet, publisher and editor (born 1943)
- 22 April – Barry Humphries, comedian, author, actor and satirist (born 1934)
- 2 May – Gabrielle Carey, novelist (born 1959)
- 22 May – Andrew Burke, poet (born 1944)
- 30 June – Ron Pretty, poet (born 1940)
- 6 August – Elizabeth Webby, scholar of Australian literature (born 1942)
- 18 November – Nan Witcomb, poet and radio broadcaster (born 1927/1928)
- 21 November – Dale Spender, feminist writer (born 1943)
- 10 December – Michael Blakemore, actor, writer and theatre director (born 1928)
- 12 December – Shirley Barber, children's author and illustrator (born 1935 in the Channel Islands)
- 30 December – John Pilger, journalist and filmmaker (born 1939) (died in the United Kingdom)

== See also ==
- 2023 in Australia
- 2023 in literature
- 2023 in poetry
- List of years in Australian literature
- List of years in literature
