= Portrait of Madame Cézanne =

Portrait of Madame Cézanne may refer to:

- Portrait of Madame Cézanne (Barnes Foundation) — painting by Paul Cézanne, 1885—1887 (now Barnes Foundation, Philadelphia, Pennsylvania)
- Portrait of Madame Cézanne with Loosened Hair, Philadelphia Museum of Art
- One other of some 44 portraits Cezanne painted of his wife, Marie-Hortense Fiquet between 1869 and the 1890s
- Portrait of Madame Cézanne (Roy Lichtenstein) a painting by Roy Lichtenstein, 1962, adapting the Barnes Cézanne
