= The Sitter (novel) =

2023 novel by Australian author Angela O'Keeffe

- Author: Angela O'Keeffe
- Language: English
- Genre: Literary fiction
- Publisher: University of Queensland Press
- Publication date: 1 August 2023
- Publication place: Australia
- Media type: Print
- Pages: 180 pp.
- Awards: 2024 New South Wales Premier's Literary Awards — Christina Stead Prize for Fiction
- ISBN: 9780702266348

The Sitter is a 2023 novel by the Australian author Angela O'Keeffe.

It was the winner of the 2024 New South Wales Premier's Literary Awards — Christina Stead Prize for Fiction.

== Synopsis ==
An Australian writer (known only as "the writer" here) has travelled to France to research a book about Marie-Hortense Fiquet (1850–1922), wife of the artist Paul Cézanne. Marie-Hortense sat for 29 portraits by her husband, but very little is known about her. As the writer researches the book, Marie-Hortense becomes reawakened by the creative process and watches over the novelist as she is confined to a hotel room during the initial outbreak of the COVID-19 pandemic in 2020.

As much as the writer is intrigued by Marie-Hortense, so is she intrigued by the writer, wanting to know why she has "re-emerged" in this way, what the writer has uncovered, and why, as the novel progresses, does the writer abandon the first work and begin on something new, something more personal.

== Critical reception ==
Writing for the ArtsHub website reviewer Gemma Betros felt the emphasis in the novel might have been in the wrong place: "In imagining a voice for her that summons wider reflections on gender and history, O'Keeffe reminds us that Fiquet had an identity, and words, of her own. But the character of "the writer" is even more compelling, suggesting that authors – and publishers – are perhaps sometimes too quick to look for a Parisian connection."

In a review in Australian Book Review, Naama Grey-Smith came to a similar conclusion finding that "the book's energy is with the writer's tale."

Felicity Plunkett, in The Saturday Paper, called the novel "a prismatic story of creativity and observation," and concluded that it is "a novel trawling the shades of bruised histories, studying the tender mutual disclosure of what is unseen, blanked out or lost."

== Awards ==
Year	Award	Category	Result	Ref.
2024	Miles Franklin Award	—	Longlisted	
2024	New South Wales Premier's Literary Awards	Christina Stead Prize for Fiction	Won	
2024	New South Wales Premier's Literary Awards	People's Choice Award	Shortlisted	

== See also ==
- 2023 in Australian literature

== Notes ==
- Epigraph: 'Shade, too, can be inhabited.' Gaston Bachelard, The Poetics of Space
- Dedication: For Caroline and Frida Loved always
