= Tearaway =

Tearaway, tear away, tear-away or variant may refer to:

== Fiction ==
- Tearaway (novel), a 1670 picaresque novel by Hans Jakob Christoffel von Grimmelshausen
- Tearaway Magazine, youth lifestyle magazine
- "Torn Away", short story by Joe R. Lansdale from Twilight Zone: 19 Original Stories on the 50th Anniversary
- Tearaway (video game), a 2013 adventure video game for the PlayStation Vita
  - Tearaway Unfolded, a 2015 expanded remake for the PlayStation 4

== Music ==
- "Tear Away", Drowning Pool nu metal single
- "Tearing Away", death metal song from the fifth studio album of Sadist
