= Jehan Casinader =

New Zealand journalist and television presenter

- Education: BA (Victoria University of Wellington)
- Occupation: Journalist

Jehan Casinader is a New Zealand journalist and television presenter.

== Early life ==
Casinader was born in New Zealand to Sri Lankan immigrant parents and raised in Lower Hutt. His father had been a print journalist in Sri Lanka, and worked at The Dominion Post after moving to New Zealand, so news and current affairs was a constant component of Casinader's home life and upbringing.

I think I was four years old, my parents tell me, when I first told them that I wanted to be a reporter.

Casinader's first television appearance was on the game show Small Talk hosted by Jason Gunn in 1997. At the age of 13 Casinader successfully pitched a story on The Lord of the Rings to the Holmes programme on TV One. He then began writing for youth magazine Tearaway, which gave him the opportunity at the age of 15 to interview then Prime Minister Helen Clark. Casinader went on to successfully pitch multiple features to The New Zealand Herald as a 16 year old.

Casinader studied Bachelor of Arts (majoring in Public Policy and International Relations) at Victoria University of Wellington.

== Journalism career ==
After finishing university Casinader was employed on TVNZ's Close Up and remained on staff when the programme rebooted as Seven Sharp. In 2016 Jehan moved to TVNZ’s current affairs programme, Sunday

Casinader produced and presented the talk show The Inside Word in 2018 which aired on TVNZ’s Duke channel, tackling tough topics such as negative body image, alcoholism and cyberbullying.

Casinader won 'Best Team Video' at the 2018 Voyager Media Awards for his team's coverage of the 2017 Edgecumbe flood. Casinader was also named 'Reporter of the Year' at the 2018 New Zealand Television Awards.

In 2019 Casinader presented an episode of What Next? on TVNZ 1 exploring future advances in medicine.
