= Crushing (novel) =

Romantic comedy novel by Genevieve Novak

- Author: Genevieve Novak
- Language: English
- Genre: Romantic comedy
- Publisher: HarperCollins Australia
- Publication date: 1 April 2023
- Publication place: Australia
- ISBN: 1460714768
- OCLC: 1375619389

Crushing is a romantic comedy novel written by Australian author Genevieve Novak. It follows 28 year-old serial monogamist Marnie who intends to remain single after a bad break-up. However, she soon meets and falls for Isaac, who is already in a relationship.

== Reception ==
Jessie Tu of The Sydney Morning Herald praised the "solid" writing, the "swift" pacing, the "unlaboured" dialogue and the characterisation of Marnie, opining that Novak "succeeds" in "simply trying to render the ordinary realities of being a woman." Samuel Bernard of The Australian wrote that Novak's "honesty and absorbing characters make her voice so unique and compelling." Selah Ritchie of Tearaway Magazine highly recomennded the novel and called it "well and cleverly written" while criticising its "perpetuation of binge drinking culture".
