= Lauren Aimee Curtis =

Australian writer

Lauren Aimee Curtis is an Australian writer. She was born in Sydney in 1988. She is best known for her debut novel Dolores which was nominated for several literary prizes. It was also named a New Statesman Book of the Year. Her second book, Strangers at the Port, was longlisted for the 2024 Miles Franklin Award.

In 2023, she was nominated by Granta magazine as one of the best young writers in the UK.
