= We Come with This Place =

2022 book by Debra Dank

- Author: Debra Dank
- Genre: Memoir
- Publisher: Echo Publishing
- Publication date: 5 July 2022
- Publication place: Australia
- Pages: 272
- Awards: New South Wales Premier's Literary Awards Book of the Year
- ISBN: 9781760687403

We Come with This Place is a 2022 memoir by Aboriginal author and academic Debra Dank. The book pays tribute to Dank's family and Gudanji Country, and criticises Australia's history of ingrained racism against its First Nations people. The book won multiple awards, including the 2023 ALS Gold Medal and a record-breaking four awards at the 2023 New South Wales Premier's Literary Awards.

== Summary ==
We Come With This Place is composed of multiple non-linear and interweaved stories. Dank discusses the story of her father, known as "Soda", who was falsely accused of stealing cattle and was chased out of the Northern Territory as a result, as well as the story of the sexual violence inflicted on her paternal grandmother. The book also discusses Australia's frontier wars and First Nations Dreaming stories.

== Publication history ==
Dank wrote We Come with This Place as part of her PhD in narrative theory and semiotics at Deakin University. The book was published by Echo Publishing in July 2022. Dank has expressed hope that the book will draw attention to the threat that fracking poses to her people's country in the Beetaloo Basin.

== Reception ==
The book was positively received by reviewers. In a review published in The Saturday Paper, Tony Birch described Dank's journey as "courageous and inspirational" and wrote that "the manner in which Dank weaves her story, delivered with subtlety, is mesmerising". Writing in The Guardian, Tara June Winch described the book as "a jewel to rival Australia’s great desert memoirs". A review in The Australian described the book as "truly groundbreaking writing" and "a profound expression of culture". The book was described by Melissa Lucashenko, chair of the New South Wales Premier's Literary Awards judging panel, as "all that First Nations writing can and should be".

== Awards ==
Awards for We Come With This Place
Year	Award	Category	Result	Ref.
2023	Prime Minister's Literary Awards	Non-Fiction	Shortlisted	
2023	New South Wales Premier's Literary Awards	Book of the Year	Won	
2023	New South Wales Premier's Literary Awards	UTS Glenda Adams Award for New Writing	Won	
2023	New South Wales Premier's Literary Awards	Indigenous Writers’ Prize	Won	
2023	New South Wales Premier's Literary Awards	Douglas Stewart Prize for Non-Fiction	Won	
2023	ALS Gold Medal	—	Won	
2023	Queensland Literary Awards	The University of Queensland Non-Fiction Book Award	Won	
2023	Queensland Literary Awards	Queensland Premier's Award for a Work of State Significance	Shortlisted	
2023	Queensland Literary Awards	The Courier-Mail People's Choice Queensland Book of the Year Award	Shortlisted	
2023	Stella Prize	—	Shortlisted	
