= Portrait of Madame Cézanne (Lichtenstein) =

Painting by Roy Lichtenstein

- Artist: Roy Lichtenstein
- Year: 1962
- Type: Magna on canvas
- Dimensions: 170 cm × 140 cm (68 in × 56 in)
- Location: Private collection

Portrait of Madame Cézanne (sometimes Portrait of Mrs. Cézanne) is a 1962 pop art painting by Roy Lichtenstein. It is a quotation of Erle Loran's diagram of one of Paul Cézanne's 27 portraits of his wife Marie-Hortense Fiquet, now in the Barnes Foundation, Philadelphia. It was one of the works exhibited at Lichtenstein's first solo exhibition in Los Angeles. The work became controversial in that it led to a reconsideration of what constitutes art.

Lichtenstein and Loran sparred in the press, and art critics were intrigued by the viewpoints of the two. Loran's view was that Lichtenstein had plagiarized his work, and at one point filed suit. Lichtenstein felt that he was making a statement with his painting on the ridiculous attempt by Loran to explain Cézanne by diagram. The press frequently used the word transformation when crediting Lichtenstein's work, but Lichtenstein attempted not to accept the association of his work with that word.

== Background ==
Erle Loran's diagram of Portrait of Madame Cézanne from Cézanne's Composition, 1943

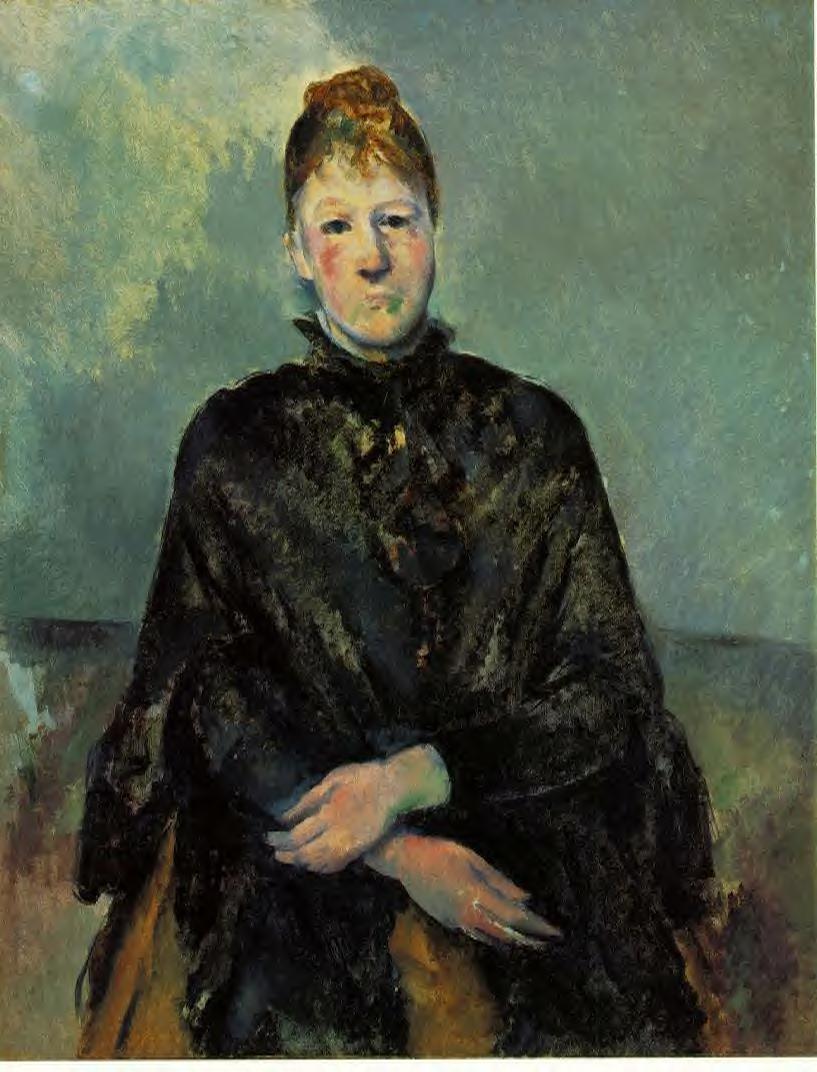
Paul Cézanne, Portrait of Madame Cézanne, 1885–1887, Barnes Foundation, Philadelphia, Pennsylvania

Portrait of Madame Cézanne was exhibited along with works such as Man with Folded Arms at Lichtentein's first Pop exhibition in Los Angeles. The linear twice-removed black-and-white (along with Man with Folded Arms) is regarded as a quotation of Erle Loran's outline diagram of Cézanne's compositional methods published in a diagram book called Cézanne's Composition. The book was popular in the academic community. Loran's representation in a "harsh black outline" depicted the axes of the composition without representing the "texture and expressiveness of Cézanne's original." In fact, Loran stated that "this diagrammatic approach may seem coldly analytical to those who like vagueness and poetry in art criticism." Loran's diagrammatic techniques were standard at the time; redrawn outlines of the figure were illustrated with alphabetized arrows to identify areas and directions. The diagram highlighted body part positioning without studying the painted surface.

According to John Coplans's Roy Lichtenstein, the artist was fascinated by the drawings: "isolating the woman out of the context of the painting seemed to Lichtenstein to be such an oversimplification of a complex issue as to be ironical in itself"; the oversimplification referred to was Loran's representing Cézanne's work with nothing more than black lines. The work marked the first of Lichtenstein's "artistic appropriations of the canonical works of Modernism" that resulted from his realization of the interrelation "between avant-garde and kitsch".

== Description ==
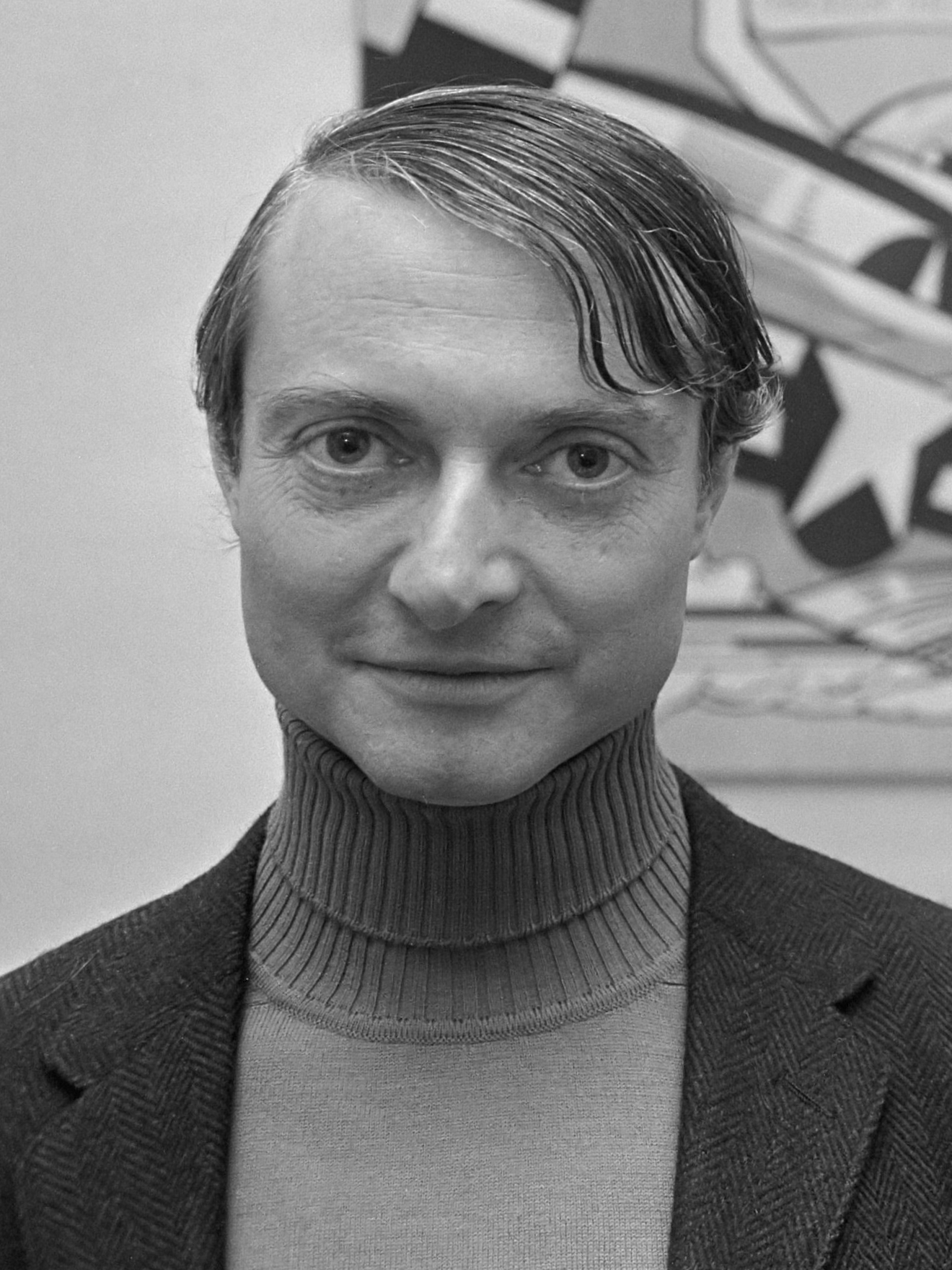
Lichtenstein in 1967

The two images garnered attention among critics by highlighting the nuances between copying and creating art, between real and fake art. As Andy Warhol challenged the status quo by "humanizing mass-produced product", Lichtenstein dehumanized masterpieces. Portrait of Madame Cézanne demonstrates "that the quotation of popular culture was not the sign of intelligence suspended but rather the shape of thought."

The publication of this work was considered by some observers as more sacrilegious than Duchamp's revisions to the Mona Lisa. Loran wrote two hot-tempered letters in response, which were published in September 1963 issues of ARTnews and Artforum. His articles were written after Lichtenstein's first Pop exhibition in Los Angeles, which featured the two life-sized works depicting Loran's images. Loran, whose text was by this time over twenty years old, even attempted to sue Lichtenstein. According to David Deitcher, "The angrier of the two tracts appeared in Art News, where Loran openly expressed his contempt for Lichtenstein's work and hinted at his desire to sue.":

In a recent sell-out exhibition at the Ferus Gallery, Los Angeles, he [Lichtenstein] gave the title of Portrait of Mme. Cézanne to the black and white line drawing on bare canvas reproduced here. Sale price: $2000, or more. I suppose I should be flattered that a diagrammatic sketch of mine should be worth so much. But then, no one has paid me anything—so far.

— Quote from Erle Loran's September 1963 "Pop Artists or Copycats?" ARTnews article,

One critic noted that although Loran was making instructive points with his diagram, Lichtenstein's was an artistic statement. However, Loran was joined by Brian O'Doherty, a critic with The New York Times, in ridiculing the defense of Pop art as transformative rather than appropriationist art. In 1963, O'Doherty wrote his belief that Lichtenstein's work was not art in The New York Times saying, he was "one of the worst artists in America" who "briskly went about making a sow's ear out of a sow's ear." Loran felt Pop art paled in comparison to the aesthetics of Abstract Expressionism. Lichtenstein did not accept the transformation defense. Other critics got involved in the matter, with Gene Swenson querying Lichtenstein "about the charges of antagonistic critics 'that Pop Art does not transform its models." Lichtenstein responded that art forms but does not transform. Max Kozloff opined that Loran was being mocked and that while Lichtenstein's product had didactic content, its purpose and need was questionable. Kozloff worried in The Nation that Lichtenstein's work may lead to the values that modern art held being rejected moving forward.

The painting is regarded as "another of his comments on the way in which we view art." The work, along with his Femme au Chapeau from 1962 mark the beginnings of Lichtenstein's presentations of art about art because it was among his first paintings that drew upon a predecessor artist. Lichtenstein noted his objection to the attempt to reduce art diagrammatically: "I wasn't trying to berate Erle Loran ... but it is such an oversimplification trying to explain a painting by A, B, C." He also noted that "The Cézanne is such a complex painting. Taking an outline and calling it Madame Cézanne is in itself humorous, particularly the idea of diagramming a Cézanne when Cézanne said, '... the outline escaped me.'"

Lichtenstein obtained legal validation that his work was original when Loran's lawsuit was dismissed, clearing the way for artists to elaborate on images produced by others.

== See also ==
- 1962 in art
