= Compulsion (Scott novel) =

2023 novel by Kate Scott

- Author: Kate Scott
- Language: English
- Publisher: Penguin Random House
- Publication date: 10 January 2023
- Publication place: Australia
- ISBN: 1760146102
- OCLC: 1343946510

Compulsion is a novel written by Australian author Kate Scott. Her debut novel, it follows Lucy Lux, a young music journalist who leaves her life behind by escaping to the seaside town of Abergele, where she meets Robin, a photographer and the son of a prominent record producer.

== Reception ==
The Sydney Morning Herald stated: "The book captures with effortless lyricism the heady sense of decadence and doom suffusing youth culture in the early 2000s – and will appeal especially to those who lived through it." Elaine Chennatt of the Aniko Magazine opined that while there is "vivid storytelling and plenty to thrill any diehard 80s music lovers", the plot "left a lot to be desired." Mia Ferreira of ArtsHub gave the novel a 3/5 rating, criticised the "flowery language and retro 70s and 80s imagery" as "contrived" and "excessive". However, she wrote: "Compulsion may seem superficial and selfish in the face of all the disasters and serious issues of our world, and it may be a little hard to digest at first, but beneath the surface lies a deep existential yearning for love, meaning and purpose."
