= Debra Dank =

Australian writer

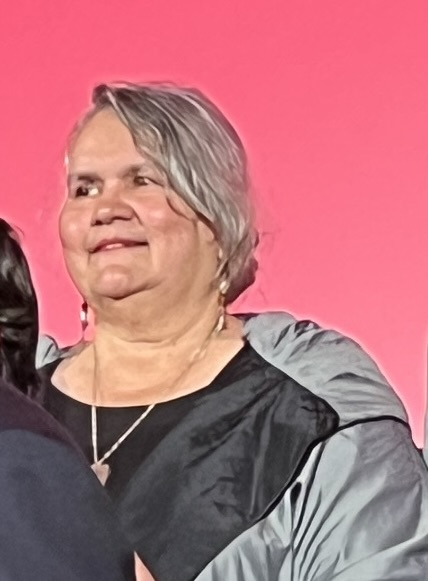
- Dank at the 2023 NSW Premier's Literary Awards
- Education: Deakin University
- Occupation: Memoirist
- Writing career
- Notable work: We Come With This Place
- Notable awards: New South Wales Premier's Literary Awards: Book of the Year; Douglas Stewart Prize for Non-Fiction; UTS Glenda Adams Award for New Writing; Indigenous Writers' Prize

Debra Dank is an Aboriginal Australian author and academic. She is known for her 2022 memoir We Come With This Place, which won an unprecedented four prizes at the 2023 New South Wales Premier's Literary Awards.

== Early life and education ==
Debra Dank is a Gudanji / Wakaja and Kalkadoon woman from the Barkly Tableland in the Northern Territory.

She completed a Master of Education and graduated with a PhD in narrative theory and semiotics at Deakin University in Melbourne in 2021.

== Writing career ==
Dank adapted her award-winning book, We Come With This Place, from work towards her PhD thesis. She was encouraged by her supervisor to shape the book without chapters to allow what she described as "nonlinear storying as it exists in my community".

== Teaching ==
Dank has spent around 40 years working in primary, secondary, and tertiary education in Queensland, New South Wales, Victoria, and the Northern Territory.

Dank was a lecturer in Indigenous studies at the University of the Sunshine Coast from February to September 2023.

In August 2023 she was appointed Enterprise Fellow with the University of South Australia in Adelaide, a research and teaching position focusing on topics that directly benefit Aboriginal peoples.

== Other activities ==
Dank was due to join a discussion about the role of storytelling, hosted by the Bob Hawke Prime Ministerial Centre in partnership with WOMADelaide Planet Talks, along with filmmaker Rachel Perkins, and led by playwright Wesley Enoch, in March 2025. However, she was unable to attend owing to Cyclone Alfred in Queensland.

== Recognition and awards ==
We Come With This Place was included on the 2022 Prime Minister's Summer Reading List, compiled by the Grattan Institute. In April 2023 it was shortlisted for the Stella Prize.

At the 2023 New South Wales Premier's Literary Awards, Dank won an unprecedented four awards, the Douglas Stewart Prize for Non-Fiction, UTS Glenda Adams Award for New Writing, the Indigenous Writers' Prize, and overall Book of the Year, for We Come With This Place.

In July 2023, We Come With This Place won the Australian Literature Society Gold Medal.

At the Queensland Literary Awards it won the Nonfiction Book Award and was shortlisted for the Queensland Premier's Award for a Work of State Significance and the People's Choice Queensland Book of the Year Award. It was also shortlisted for the Nonfiction Award at the 2023 Prime Minister's Literary Awards.

An extract from We Come With This Place was included in a 2023 NSW Higher School Certificate examination.

Dank's 2025 book, Ankami, was shortlisted for the 2026 Victorian Premier's Prize for Nonfiction.

Terraglossia, published in 2025, was shortlisted for the Nonfiction award at the 2026 Prime Minister's Literary Awards.

== Works ==
- Ridimbat Langa Ola Biginnini = Reading with Children, parallel text, dual-language book in Kriol and English, Indigenous Literacy Foundation, 2011
- We Come With This Place, Echo Publishing, 2022
- Ankami, Echo Publishing, 2025
- Terraglossia, Echo Publishing, 2025
