= Wendy Mocke =

Wendy Mocke is a Papua New Guinean actress, playwright and screenwriter and storyteller, based in Australia. She is known for her work across theatre, film, television and visual arts, and for exploring Melanesian and Black Pacific Islander identity through her creativity.

== Early life and education ==
Mocke grew up in Madang in Papua New Guinea, before moving to Cairns in Australia at the age of 12 to attend boarding school. She later studied acting at the National Institute of Dramatic Art.

== Filmography ==
Year	Title	Role
2022	It's Fine, I'm Fine	Betty
2024	Bad Ancestors	Nora

== Award nominations ==
- AACTA Award for Best Online Series.
- AWGIE for Best Comedy Script.
