= Special Operations Group (book) =

Memoir by Australian authorChristophe Glasl

- Author: Christophe Glasl
- ISBN: 9780733649721

Special Operations Group is a memoir written by Christophe Glasl, a former member of the Victoria Police Special Operations Group (SOG). The book was to be published by Hachette and was intended to be Glasl's first book.

The book made headlines after being withdrawn from publication for alleged inaccurate claims. In particular, a claim by the author to have been present at the Port Arthur massacre was questioned by Victoria Police, leading to the publisher withdrawing the book.

== Synopsis ==
The memoir provides an account of Glasl's life in the SOG, a group of ultra-fit, highly trained officers brought in to do the jobs other police cannot. Glasl joined the SOG in 1994, aspiring to be part of what he perceived as an untouchable, indestructible brotherhood. However, the book reveals a different reality, where solidarity, camaraderie, and loyalties were undermined by bullying, bastardisation, drug use, lies, and betrayal.

The book provides a raw, behind-the-scenes look at the operations of the SOG and recounts major jobs Glasl attended, including fatal shootings, a triple murder, a 100-million-dollar drug bust, and the Port Arthur massacre. However, the work, culture, and Glasl's struggle with drugs and alcohol eventually took a toll on him.

== Withdrawal ==
Despite the gripping accounts, the book was abruptly withdrawn from sale by the publisher after questions were raised about its accuracy. Victoria Police expressed concerns about the accuracy of the book, including some of Glasl's claims about jobs he attended. Of particular concern was Glasl's claimed involvement in the resolution of the Port Arthur massacre. Victoria Police confirmed that Glasl was not part of the SOG deployment to Port Arthur nor was he in Tasmania at the time.

The publisher, Hachette, stated that it had come to their attention that some of the content of the book was inaccurate and decided to withdraw the book from sale immediately while they undertook further review.
