= Portrait of Madame Cézanne with Loosened Hair =

Painting by Paul Cézanne

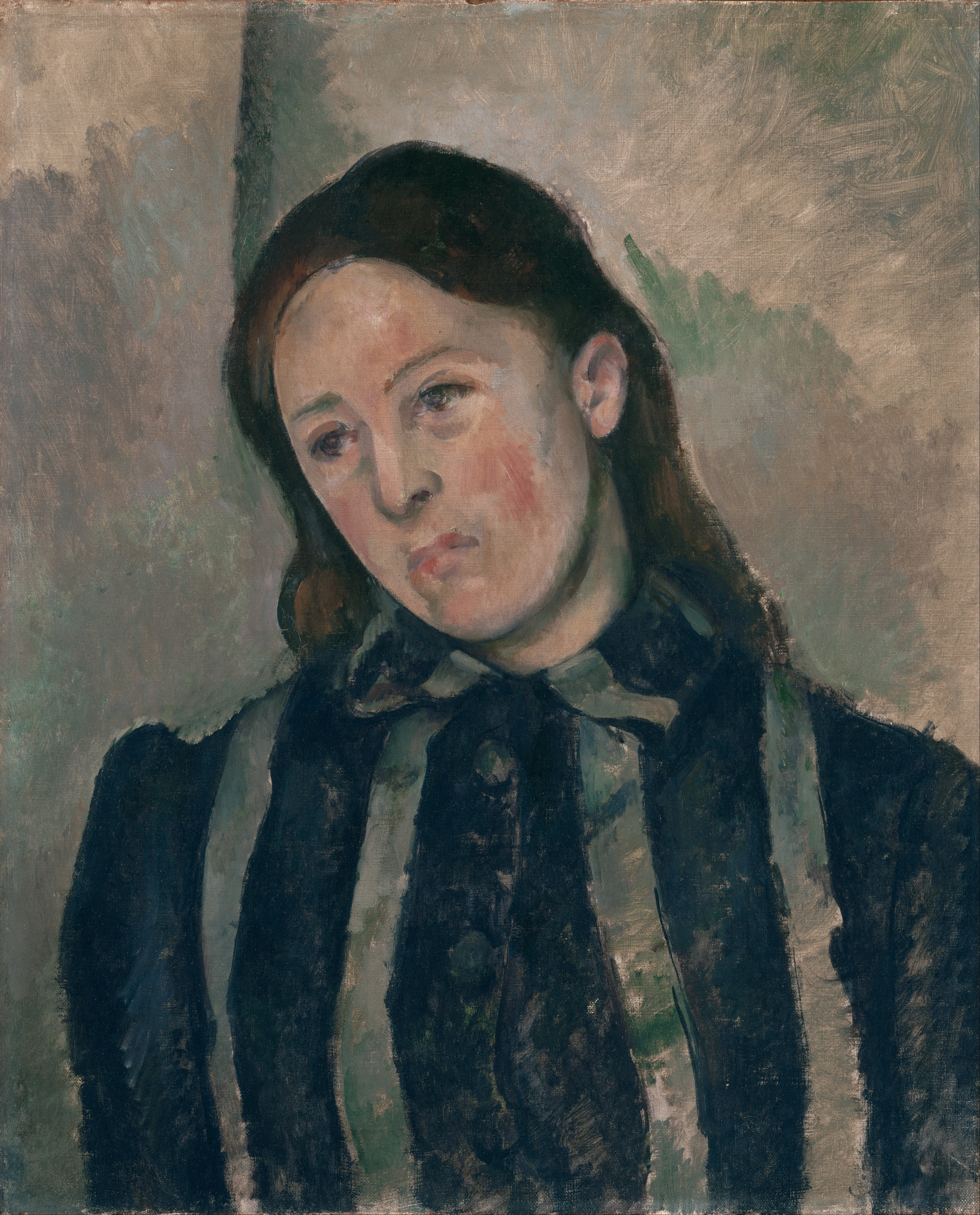
- Artist: Paul Cézanne
- Medium: Oil on canvas
- Dimensions: 61 cm × 51 cm (24 in × 20 in)
- Location: Philadelphia Museum of Art, Philadelphia

Portrait of Madame Cézanne with Loosened Hair (or Madame Cézanne with Unbound Hair) is an oil-on-canvas painting by French artist Paul Cézanne, variously dated from the mid-1870s to the early 1890s. Although the model, his wife Hortense Fiquet, was not supportive and did not understand or take an interest in her husband's work, this is one of forty-four portraits in which she sat for him from 1869, a period during which she progressed from mistress, to wife, to ex-wife. Something of a socialite, Cézanne latterly found Fiquet often fickle and shallow, and once remarked, "My wife only cares for Switzerland and lemonade". The sensitivity and depth ascribed to her in this work is likely drawn from his own personality and projected onto her image.

While elements of the work show the influence of Impressionism, it lacks the characteristic extroverted charm of that movement and instead focuses on the subject's inner life. It departs from the artist's earlier portraits of his wife, whom he had earlier divorced, in its sensitivity, delicacy of tone and more relaxed countenance, as seen in the loosened fall of her hair.

== Background ==
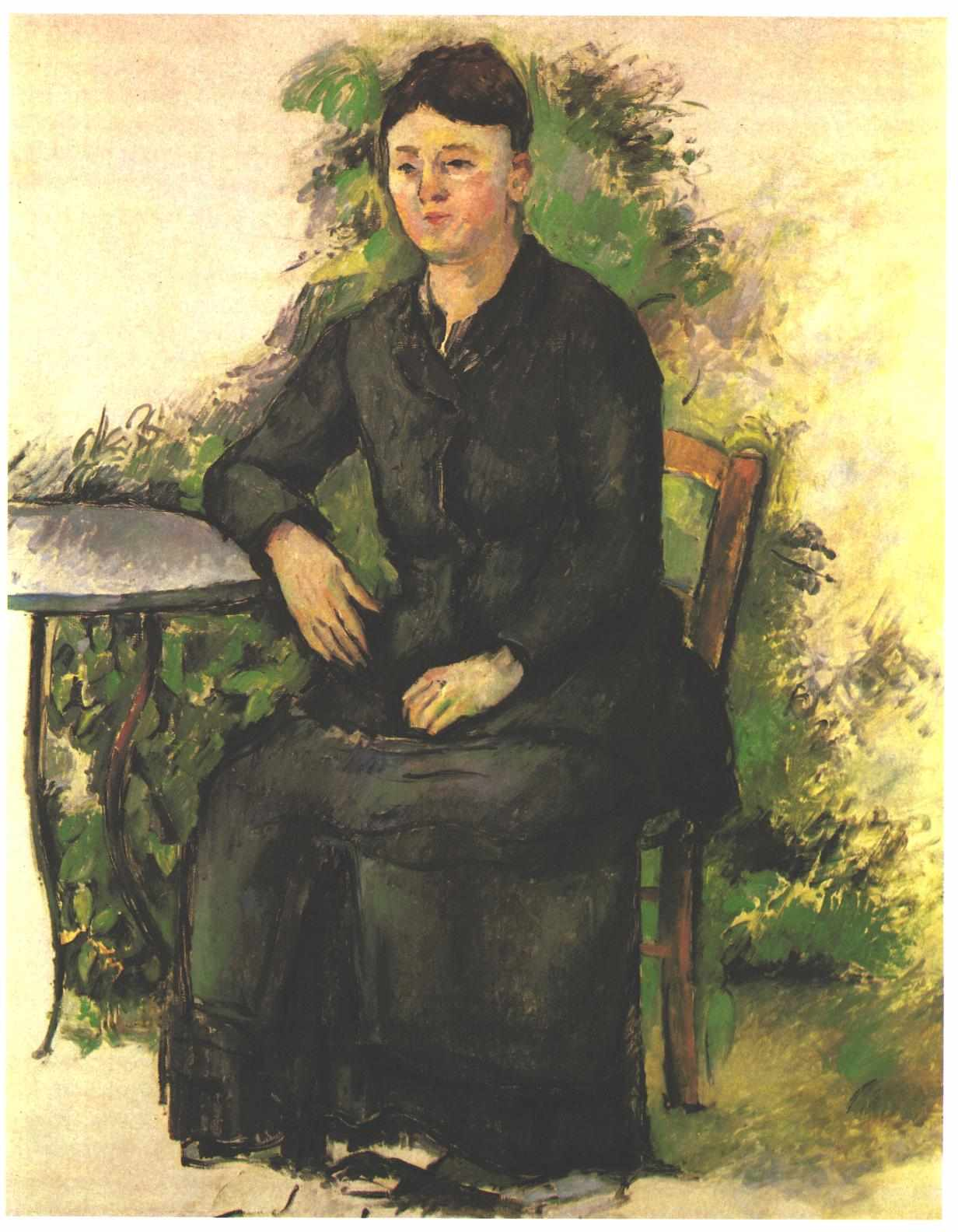
Madame Cézanne in a Garden, unknown date. Here she is presented as more extroverted, and her real life restless nature is evident.

In most of the other portraits Hortense Fiquet is presented in more formal attire that perhaps reflects the importance she ascribed to fashion; it is said that an appointment with a dressmaker caused her to be late to her husband's deathbed in 1906. Fiquet and Cézanne married on 28 April 1886, though by that time he had said that he no longer had any feelings for Hortense, whom one scholar has described as "a high-maintenance woman". Although he continued to paint his wife until the 1890s, he disinherited her; their only child, Paul (1872—1947) inherited the estate. The settlement that Hortense received from her son was squandered through gambling. After the death of Louis-Auguste Cézanne that same year, Cézanne and his wife separated, and he moved in with his sister and mother, remarking, "My wife only cares for Switzerland and lemonade". The psychological distance between husband and wife appears to be reflected in the portraits where she gives the impression of self-absorption. The tilt of her head and body in this work, along with the look of submission and the downward-shaped mouth, are all indicative of an inward, self-concerned nature.

Yet, the image is a tender representation of a coyness, shyness and sensitivity which art historian Meyer Schapiro believed to be a projection of Cézanne's own character. One critic wrote that Cézanne painted heads as if they were apples, a tendency very evident here in the blush of her cheek and the oval shape and curves of her face.

== Description ==
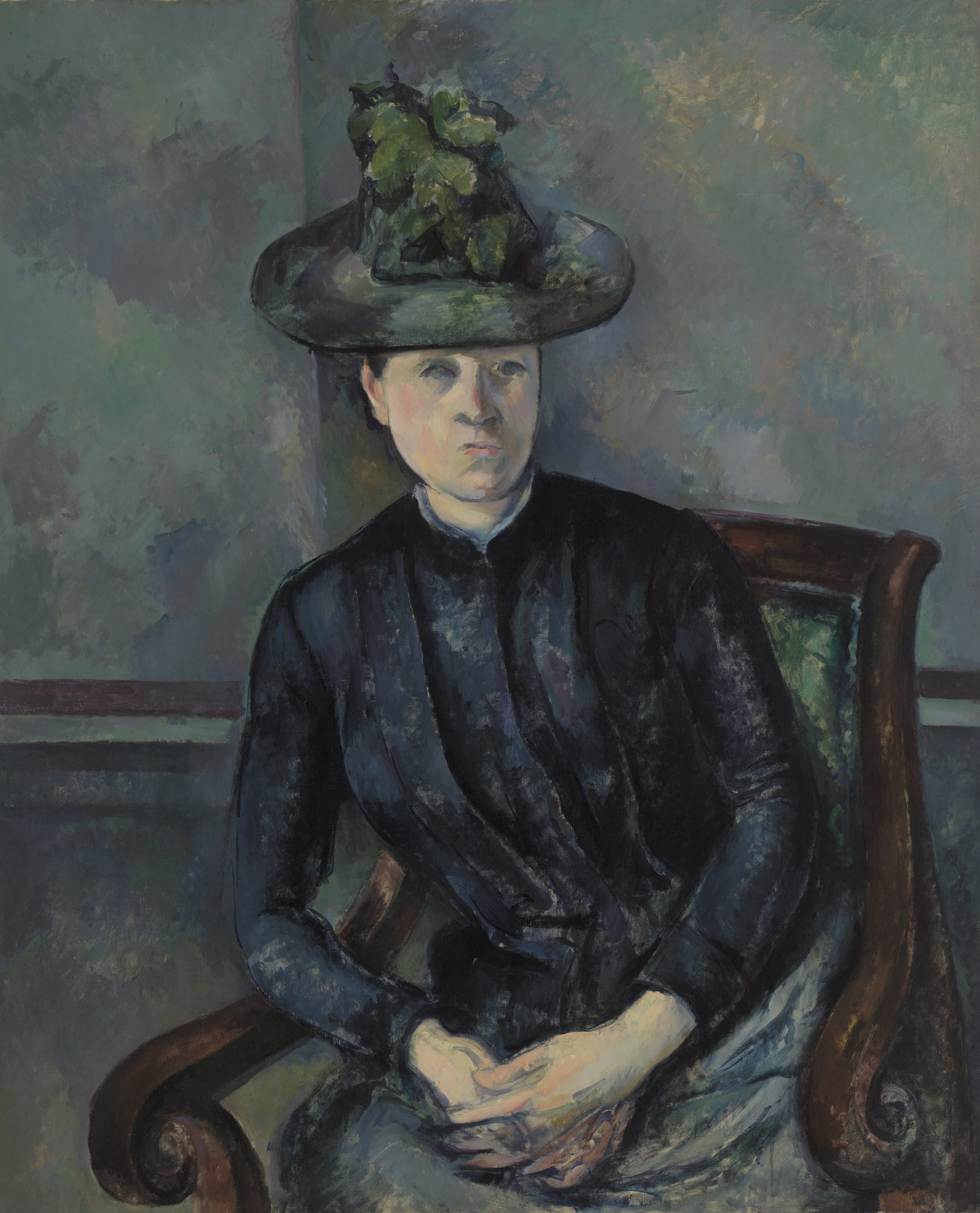
Woman in a Green Hat shows a similar left lean, and verticals on her dress.

The work is oppressively flat and rectangular. While it lacks pictorial depth, it is highly symmetrical, showing a near full-face and centred body view, with a number of playful deviations, including the lean of her head and torso and the thick vertical line in the background, which is positioned slightly to the left. As with much of Cézanne's mature work, it has many abstract forms, especially the vertical lines of her dress, which echo the diagonals of her hair and join the heavy line in the background on which her head seems to rest.

The dress may be made of blue-black velvet upon which are added bands of gray satin; such striping shows up in several earlier portraits Cézanne painted of his wife. The manner in which it utilises costume and background to express tone and mood harks back to techniques used in portraiture during the early Netherlandish period, especially those by Rogier van der Weyden.

Art historian Liliane Brion-Guerry saw in the painting a delicacy absent from later portraits by Cézanne, in which individual expressiveness would give way to "icy hardness": "The face of Madame Cézanne conveys, even in its transcription, the delicate flutter of human emotion." Though criticized for her extravagances, she possessed "an even-tempered disposition and a tireless patience. When Cézanne couldn't sleep, she read to him in the night, sometimes for hours at a time."

== Dating ==
Biographers disagree on the picture's dating and position within the series. Lionello Venturi dated it from 1883–1887, and Georges Rivière placed it in the mid-1870s. Based on its style, John Rewald wrote that it was made in the early 1890s; the fuller form of the face may indicate a later date when Madame Cézanne would have been in her forties. If Rewald's date—now accepted by the Philadelphia Museum of Art—is accurate, the painting would be the last Cézanne made of Hortense, who first posed for him in 1869.

== See also ==
- List of paintings by Paul Cézanne

== Sources ==
- Adriani, Götz. Cézanne Paintings. Harry N. Abrams, Inc., 1995. ISBN 0-8109-4026-4
- Cachin, Françoise, et al. Cézanne. Philadelphia Museum of Art, 1996. ISBN 0-87633-100-2
- Fry, Roger. Cézanne, A Study of his Development. New York: Macmillan, 1927.
- Garb, Tamar. The Painted Face, Portraits of Women in France 1814-1914. Yale University Press, 2007. ISBN 978-0-300-11118-7
- Schapiro, Meyer. Cézanne. Harry N. Abrams, 2004. ISBN 0-8109-9146-2
- Rishel, Joseph J. Philadelphia Museum of Art: Handbook of the Collections, 1995. 208.
