= Shirley Barber =

English author (1935–2023)

- Born: 23 June 1935; Guernsey, Channel Isles
- Died: 12 December 2023 (aged 88); Watsonia, Victoria, Australia
- Occupations: Children's author, illustrator
- Spouse: Keith Barber
- Children: 2
- Father: Ben Machon

Shirley Barber (23 June 1935 – 12 December 2023) was a British children's author and illustrator.

Born on 23 June 1935, Shirley spent her early childhood in Guernsey (Channel Islands). She had formal art school training at Sanderson's Furnishings, a textile and wallpaper studio in London.

Barber was a long time resident in Australia having emigrated there in 1965 and worked for a time for Oxford University Press in Melbourne, Victoria. She lived in Watsonia, a suburb of Melbourne, with her son and his family and was married twice. Her second husband Keith Barber died in 2000.

Barber wrote many picture books and fairy-themed colouring books, calendars and diaries, which have sold over 10 million copies as of 2008. Most of Barber's books featured fairies and animals. Her books were mainly set in picturesque woods. Her books were published in 18 languages.

Barber died at her home in Watsonia on 12 December 2023, at the age of 88.

== Career ==
Shirley Barber is a third-generation artist and learnt designing at Sanderson textile and wallpaper studios in London, and was awarded an "art in industry" bursary at the age of 18. During her time there, she mainly did "floral and berry nature work", which reflects her own illustrations in her books later on in life.

She later left the United Kingdom to Australia in 1965 with her family, taking on the role as an illustrator for Oxford University Press in Melbourne. Throughout her time there, she also made fairy pictures that she sold at craft markets.

Barber was 55 when she took her second rendition of "Martha B. Rabbit" to Penguin and instead was recommended to try the publisher Five Mile Press. Barber's first book "Martha B. Rabbit: the Fairies' Cook" was published by Memory Press (an imprint of Five Mile Press) in the 1980's, Barber's family still own the original first draft. Her first book received a special mention in the international Bologna Children's Book Fair picture book awards.

In 2012, she resumed her relationship with the publisher Brolly Brooks, as she first worked for them during her time at Five Mile Press. Her books have been published with them ever since, with Brolly Brooks announcing a statement to confirm the author's death at age 88 in 2023.

== Works ==
| Book Title | Date Published | Publisher |
|---|---|---|
| Martha B Rabbit: The Fairies Cook | 1988 | Memory Press |
| Rainbow Magic | 1989 | Five Mile Press |
| Teddy's Midwinter Birthday Party | 1990 | Five Mile Press |
| The Pixies' Kettle House | 1990 | Five Mile Press |
| Teddy's Forest Friends | 1990 | |
| Kite Trouble | 1990 | Five Mile Press |
| Those Wicked Rats Again | 1991 | Five Mile Press |
| Daphne the Forgetful Duck | 1991 | Five Mile Press |
| Martha B Rabbit and the Unexpected Guests | 1993 | Five Mile Press |
| The Enchanted Woods | 1993 | Five Mile Press |
| Shirley Barber's Fairy Book: An Anthology of Verse | 1995 | Five Mile Press |
| The Tooth Fairy | 1995 | Five Mile Press |
| The Mermaid Princess | 1995 | Five Mile Press |
| Tiger Tom and the Stolen Sapphires | 1996 | Five Mile Press |
| Shirley Barber's Fairy Books: Four Beautiful Board Books | 1996 | Five Mile Press |
| The Fairies' Party | 1996 | Five Mile Press |
| A Book Verse | 1996 | Five Mile Press |
| Martha B Rabbit and Friends | 1996 | |
| A Visit to Fairyland | 1997 | Five Mile Press |
| Shirley Barber's Bedtime Stories | 1997 | Five Mile Press |
| Shirley Barber's Count With Me | 1998 | Five Mile Press |
| The Seventh Unicorn | 1998 | Brolly Brooks |
| Shirley Barber's Fairy Classics Library | 2011 | Five Mile Press |
| Shirley Barber's Spellbound | 2016 | Brolly Brooks |
| Those Wicked Rats! | 2016 | Brolly Brooks |
| A Royal Adventure | 2017 | Brolly Brooks |
| A Fairyland Treasury | 2019 | Borghesi & Adam Publishers |
| All the jewels of Fairyland | 2024 | Brolly Brooks |
