= Tearaway Magazine =

New Zealand youth lifestyle magazine

- Editor: Erica McQueen
- Former editors: Rain Francis, Alexandra Cownie
- Categories: Youth
- Publisher: Erica McQueen
- Founder: John and Vicki Francis
- Founded: 1986
- First issue: November 1986
- Country: New Zealand
- Based in: Wellington
- Language: English
- Website: www.tearaway.co.nz

Tearaway Magazine is a free youth lifestyle magazine, founded in Whanganui, New Zealand in 1986. Known as The Voice of New Zealand Youth, it is aimed at teenagers and young adults in New Zealand. It is the oldest youth magazine in New Zealand currently in operation. It was founded by John and Vicki Francis and, after a series of changes of ownership in the late 2000s, early 2010s, late 2019 and mid 2020, it is now owned and edited by former Music Editor and Music Promoter Erica McQueen. In October 2014 it was announced that Tearaway was becoming fully digital, with the Term 4, 2014 edition of the magazine being its last printed issue. Tearaway is now predominantly a magazine website, with its own YouTube channel, Tearaway TV.

Content ranges from music, theatre, movies, health, education, travel and politics.

The content in Tearaway is created almost entirely by the Tearaway Mavericks, a group of young New Zealand writers, photographers, film-makers and illustrators gaining experience in the media industry, as well as a few contributors with media and communications degrees. Tearaway has writers and editors based across the country, including all of the main centres, with most of its editorial team being based in Wellington.

The name of the magazine was chosen because in New Zealand slang a "tearaway" is a bit of a rebel, which was thought to describe the magazine's readers. In addition, the founders intended to 'tear away’ from the style and attitude that most other publications had towards teenagers – to find new ways of presenting the stories of young people.

== Editorial Team and Ownership ==
Tearaway is edited by Erica McQueen, a former Maverick and Music Editor, now the owner of the magazine. In 2017, Tearaway created its first ever political editorial role, taking on student Ethan Griffiths as Political Editor. In 2019, Tearaway created its Hapori (community) Editor role, with Azaria Howell selected for the position.

In late 2019, Rain Francis, daughter of the magazines founders John and Vicki Francis stepped down as publisher. Rain sold the magazine to Alexandra and Nick Cownie, owners of Whiteboard Media Ltd, a publishing group based in Australia. Shortly after the change of ownership, the Editor, Deputy Editor and Political Editor stood down. In June 2020 during the COVID-19 economic crisis, Whiteboard Media sold the magazine to Erica McQueen, a former Maverick and Music Editor. McQueen assumed the role of Editor.

== Controversy ==
In 2003, Tearaway found itself embroiled in controversy after McDonald's in New Zealand banned the magazine from its restaurants. Liam Jeory, the Director of Corporate Relations of McDonald's Restaurants, said ‘some restaurants’ were banning the edition because of its ‘sexuality’ content, and because there was a competition giving away condoms and lubricants. In fact, the article surrounded the experience of gay young people coming out to their parents, and included a giveaway for Durex condoms, which had occurred in previous editions of the magazine also. Tearaway later responded in a press release, saying "McDonald’s advocate being a ‘family values’ restaurant. Are gay youth not part of families?".

== Notable Former Staff ==
Jehan Casinader - TVNZ Sunday Reporter

Alex Clark - PressPatron founder, NZ Tech Startup of the Year Winner

Aaron Dahmen - Newstalk ZB Parliament Press Gallery Reporter

Azaria Howell - Newstalk ZB Journalist
