= Marie-Hortense Fiquet =

Model; wife of Paul Cezanne (1850–1922)

Paul Cézanne (1839–1906), Hortense Cézanne in a Red Dress, c.1890, São Paulo Museum of Art

Marie-Hortense Fiquet Cézanne (22 April 1850 – 1922) was a French artists' model. She is best known for her marriage to Paul Cézanne and the 27 portraits, mostly in oil, he painted of her between 1869 and the late 1890s.

== Life ==
She was born in Saligney, France on 22 April 1850. In 1869, she met Cézanne at an art school in Paris called Académie Suisse. This art school was used by a number of major artists as a place to meet each other and to paint the models who worked there. Fiquet's main job was as a bookseller or bookbinder, but she combined this with part-time work as a model. They started a relationship and when the Franco-Prussian War broke out in 1871, they left Paris together for L'Estaque in the south of France. Afraid of offending his father, Louis-Auguste Cézanne, a well-to-do banker, and compromising his allowance, he went to great lengths to conceal his liaison with Fiquet. The existence of their child Paul, born in 1872, was kept from Louis-Auguste for some years.

Fiquet and Cézanne married on 28 April 1886, in the presence of the artist's parents, though by that time he had publicly said that he no longer had any feelings for her. Described by one scholar as "high-maintenance", Fiquet was to live separately from her husband for much of their married life. After the death of Louis-Auguste Cézanne that same year, Cézanne and his wife separated, the artist moving in with his sister and mother and declaring, "My wife only cares for Switzerland and lemonade". The psychological distance between husband and wife appears to be reflected in the portraits where she gives the impression of being self-absorbed.

She eventually settled in Paris. Although he continued to paint his wife until the 1890s, he disinherited her. After her husband's death in 1906, their one child, Paul (1872–1947) inherited his father's entire estate. The settlement that Hortense received from her son was squandered through gambling.

== In literature ==
Hortense may have provided inspiration for a character in L'Œuvre, an Émile Zola novel which appeared in serial form the year before the Cézannes' marriage. Zola was a friend to Cézanne from their schooldays, although the novel caused some tension between them.

In the novel, Christine, also a model, marries a painter. However the book is not biographical in the strict sense; while the fictional painter bears some relation to Cézanne, Christine poses nude, a far cry from Cézanne's chaste portraits of Fiquet, and more reminiscent of Le déjeuner sur l'herbe by Édouard Manet.

== Exhibition ==
From November 19, 2014 – March 15, 2015 the Metropolitan Museum of Art exhibited Madame Cézanne. The exhibit displayed 25 of the 29 known portraits of Madame Cézanne in a variety of mediums. The exhibition catalog was written by Dita Amory. ISBN 978-0-300-20810-8

== Gallery ==
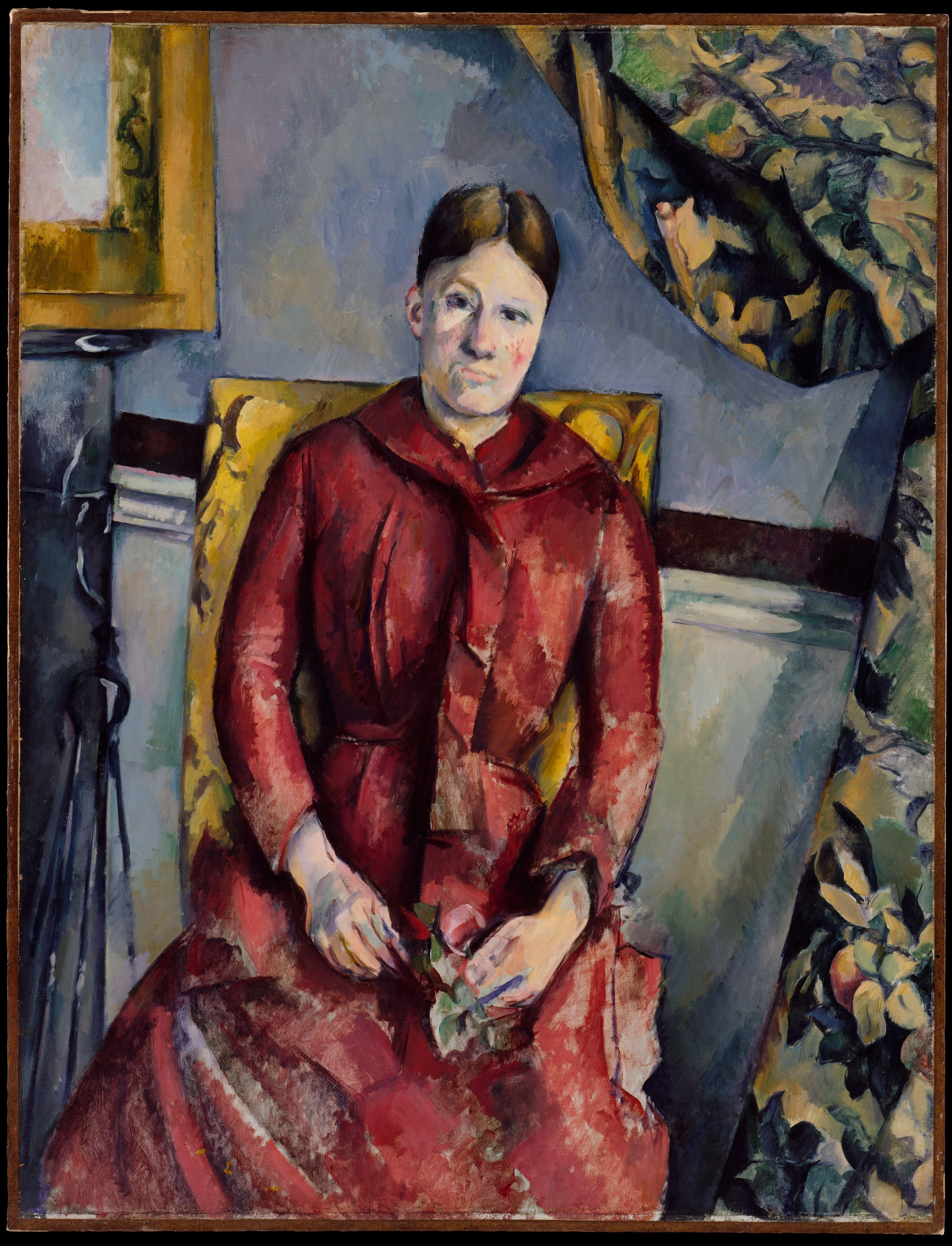
Madame Cézanne (Hortense Fiquet, 1850–1922) in a Red Dress (1888-90), oil on canvas, 116.5 x 89.5 cm, The Metropolitan Museum of Art, New York

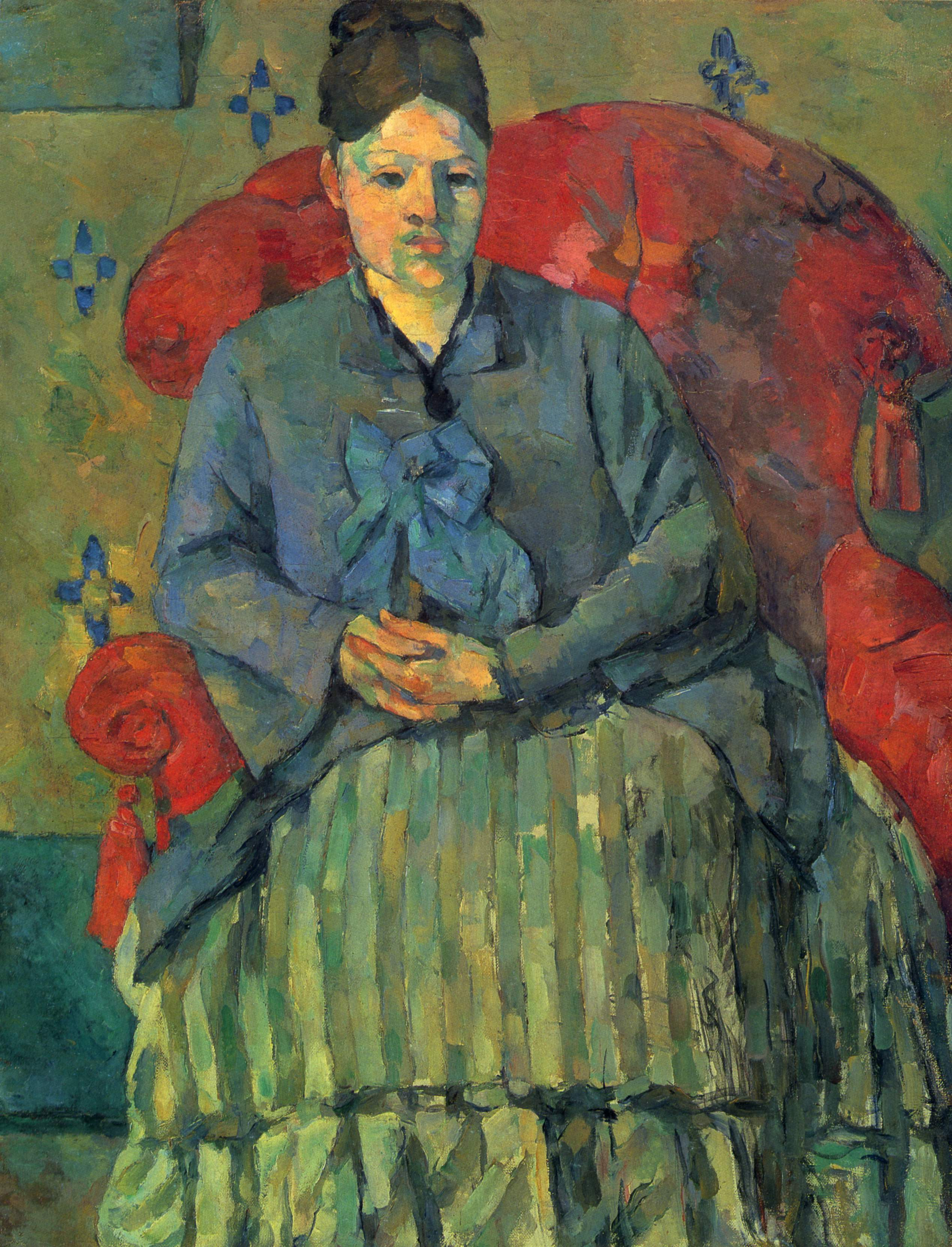
Madame Cézanne in a red armchair, 1877. Museum of Fine Arts, Boston

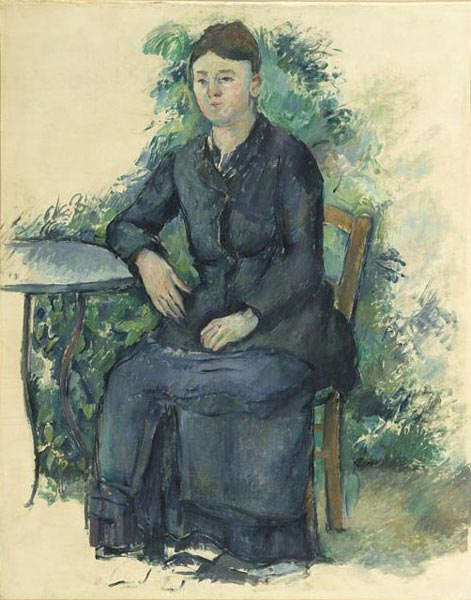
Madame Cézanne in a Garden, 1879-1880, Musée de l'Orangerie

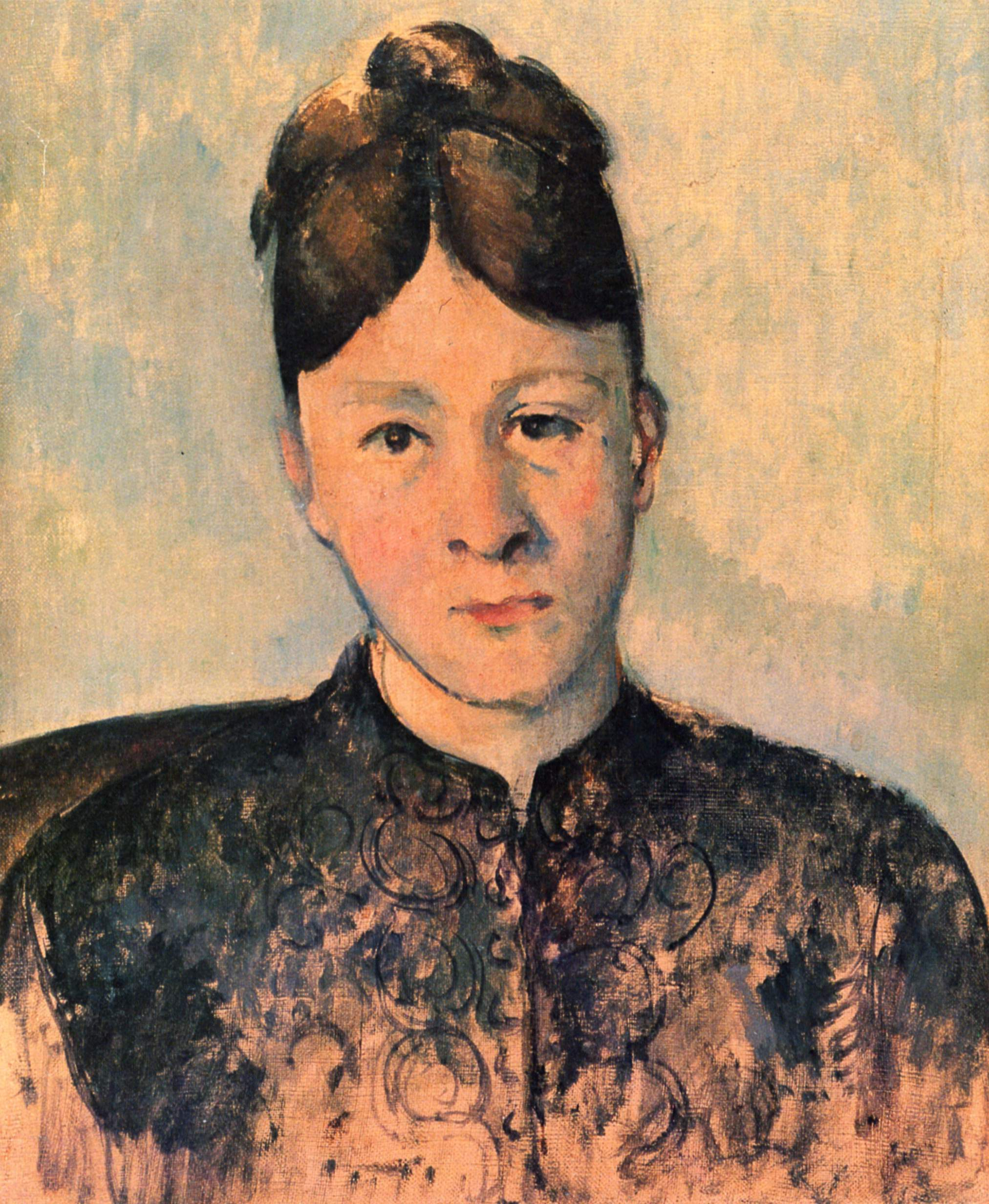
Portrait of Mme Cézanne, c. 1885, Berggruen Museum

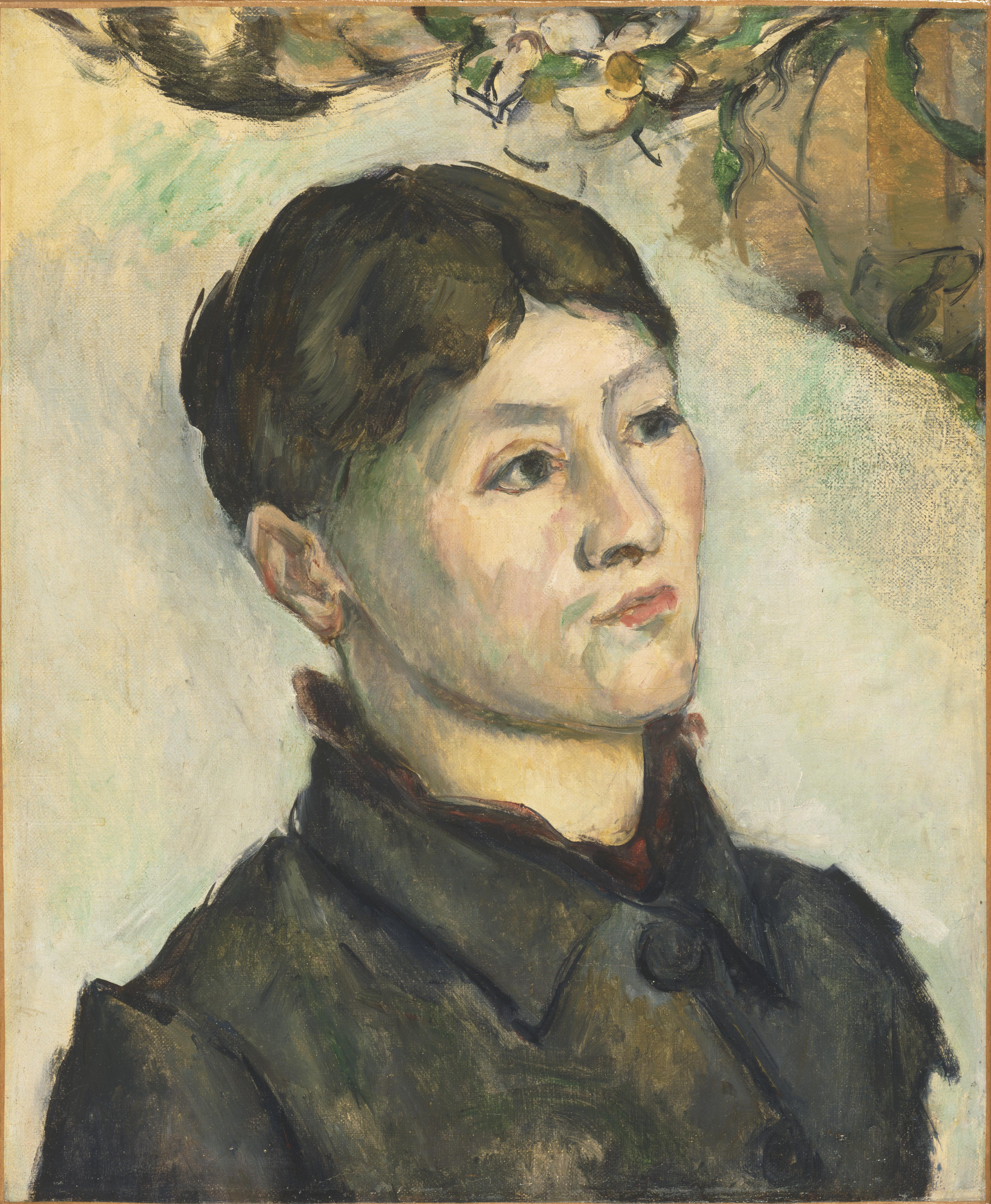
Portrait of Madame Cézanne, 1885, Philadelphia Museum of Art

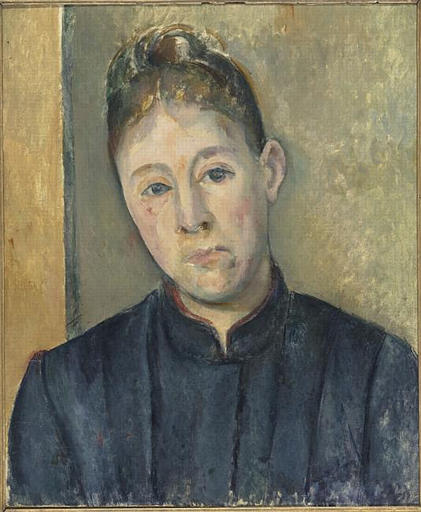
Portrait of Marie-Hortense Fiquet, 1885–1887, Musée Granet

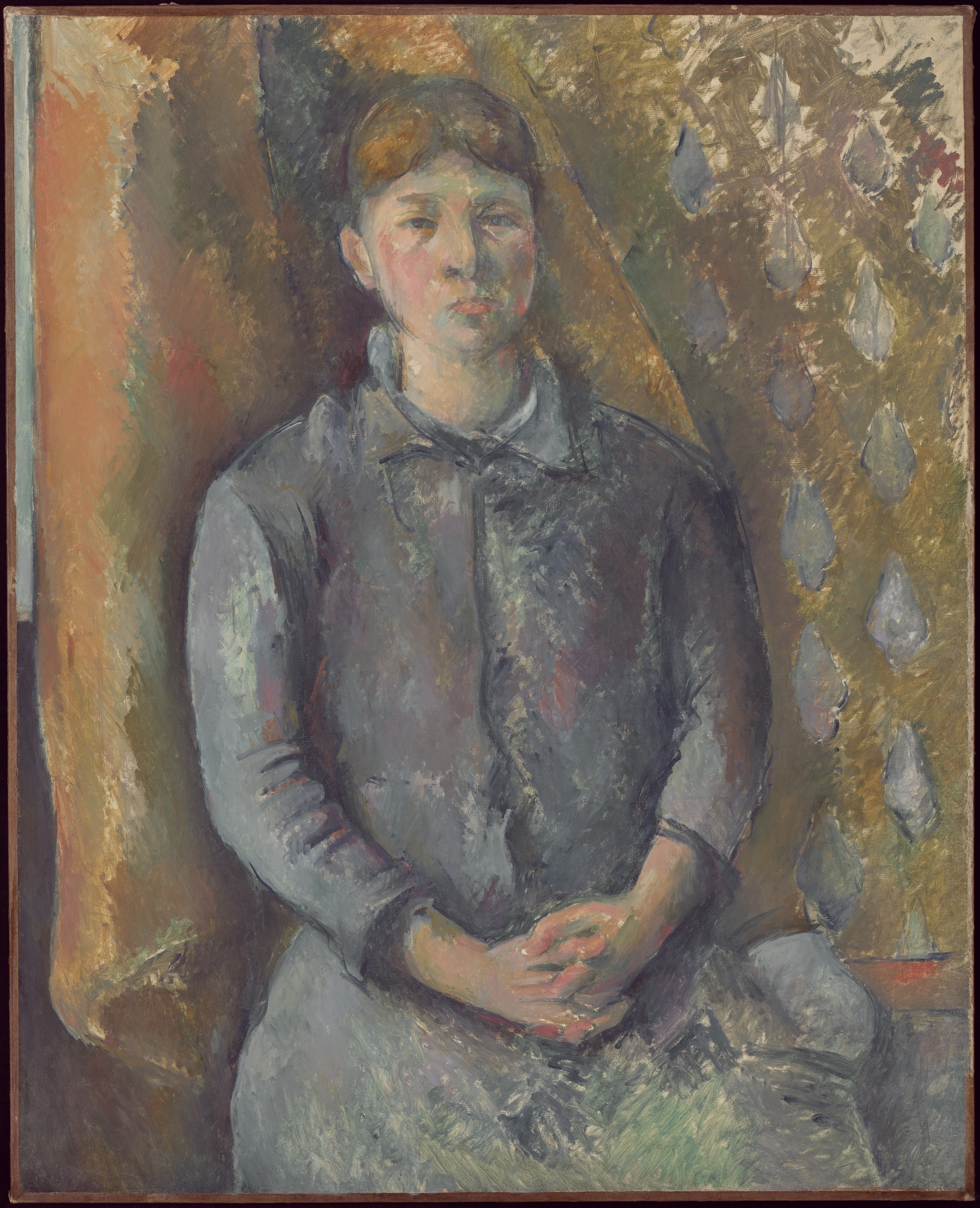
Madame Cézanne, c. 1886, Oil on canvas, The Detroit Institute of Arts

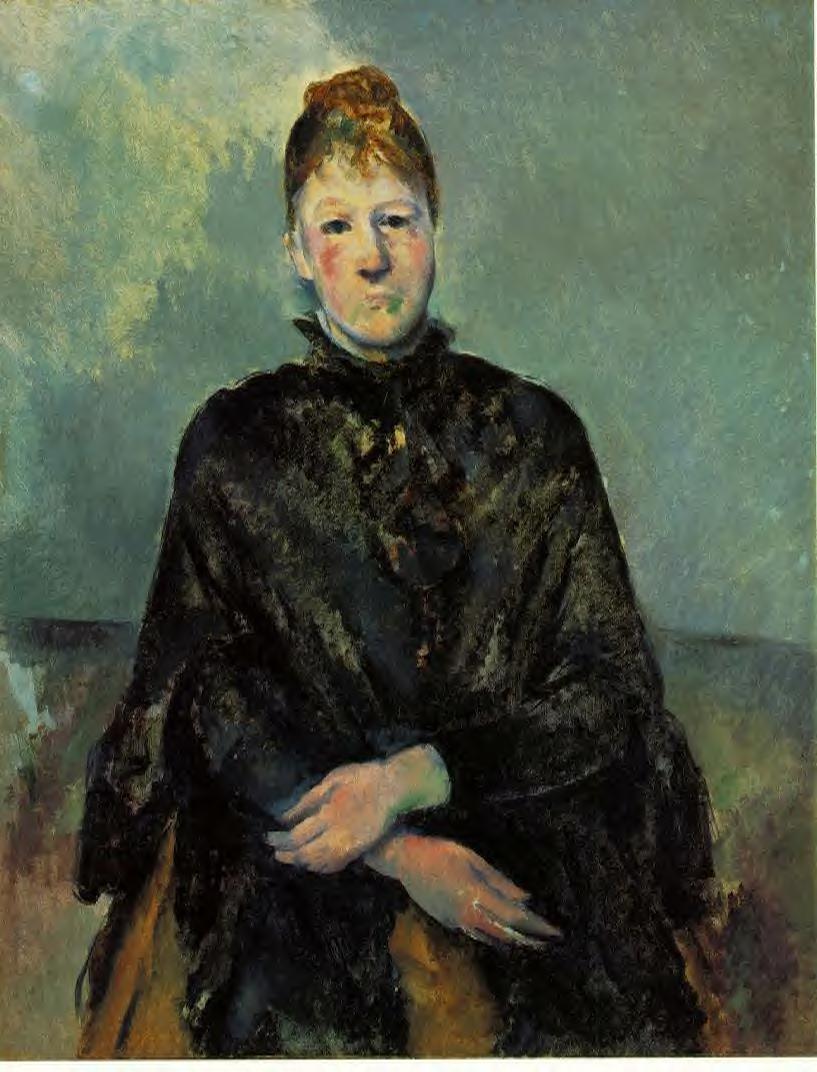
Portrait of Madame Cézanne, (1885–1887) Barnes collection

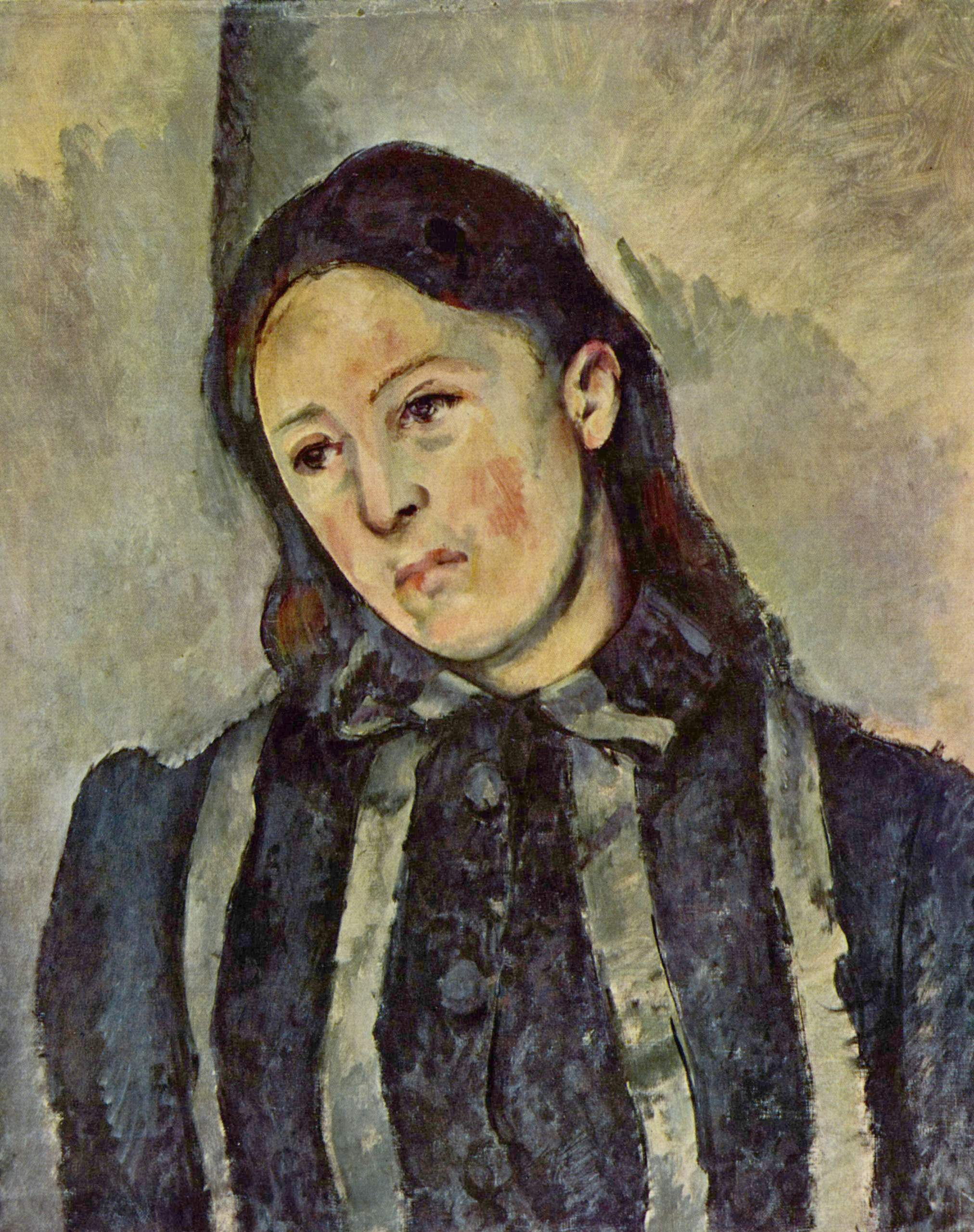
Portrait of Madame Cézanne with Loosened Hair, c. 1883 – 1887, Philadelphia Museum of Art

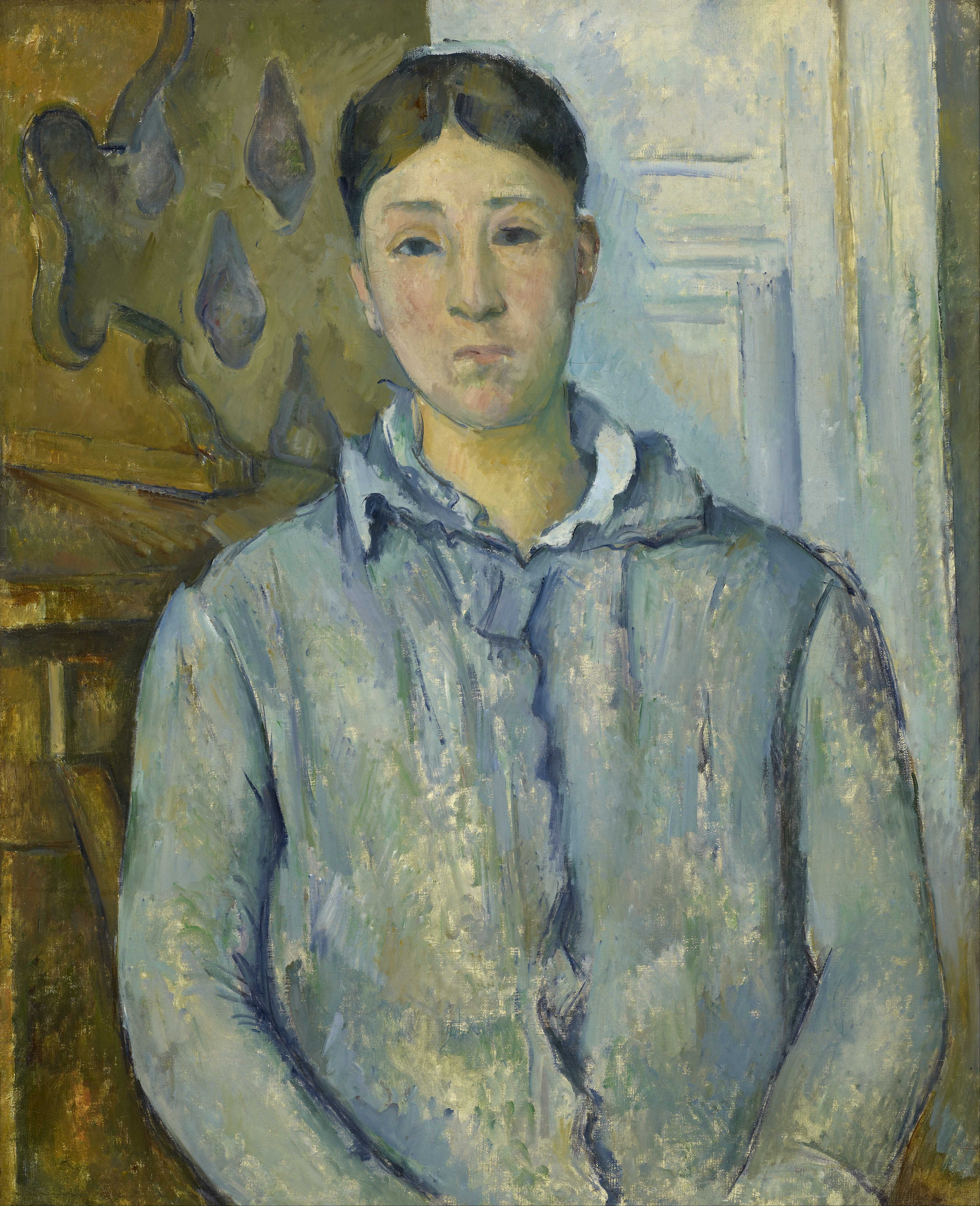
Madame Cézanne in Blue, 1890, Museum of Fine Arts, Houston

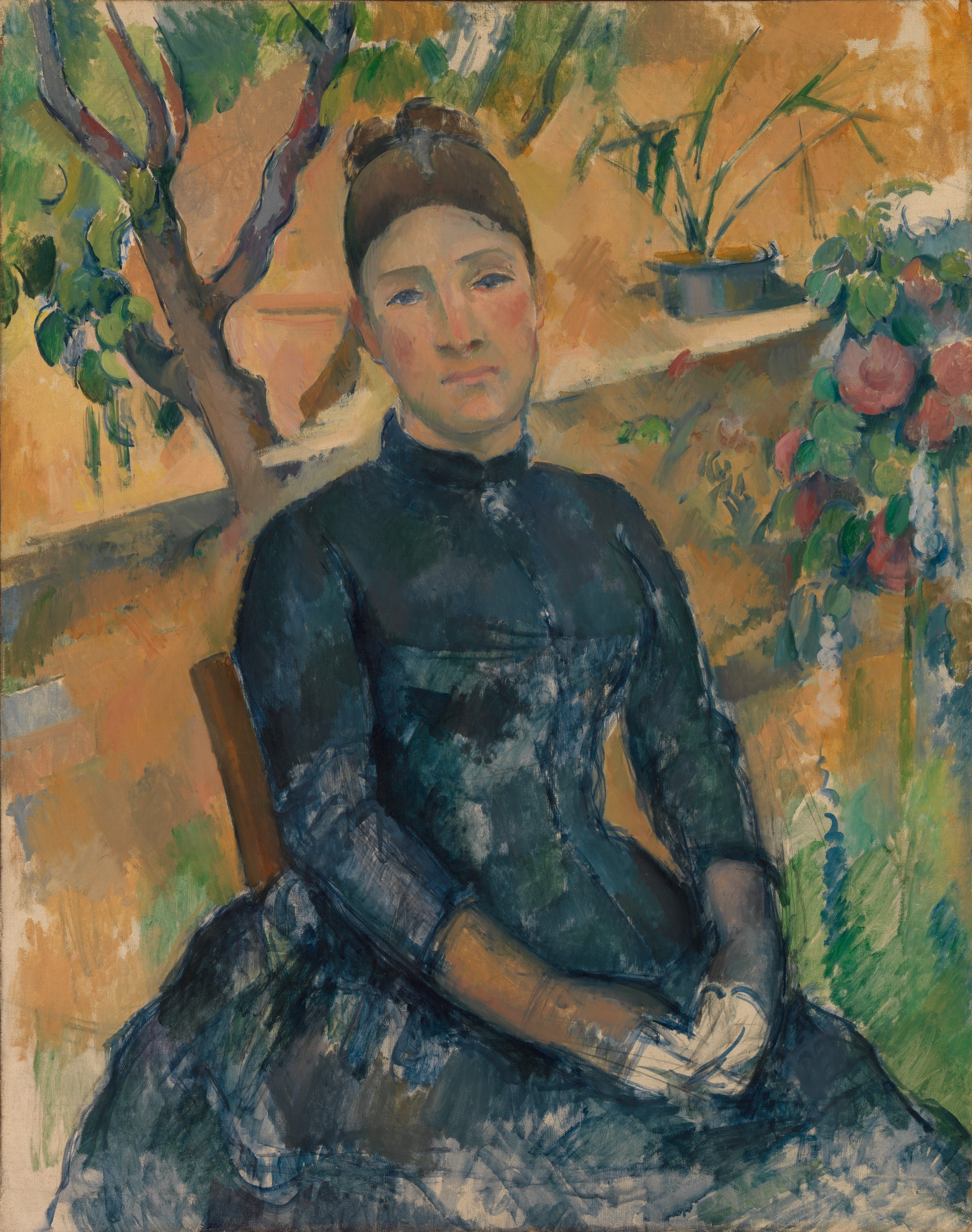
Madame Cézanne in the Greenhouse, 1891–1892. Metropolitan Museum of Art

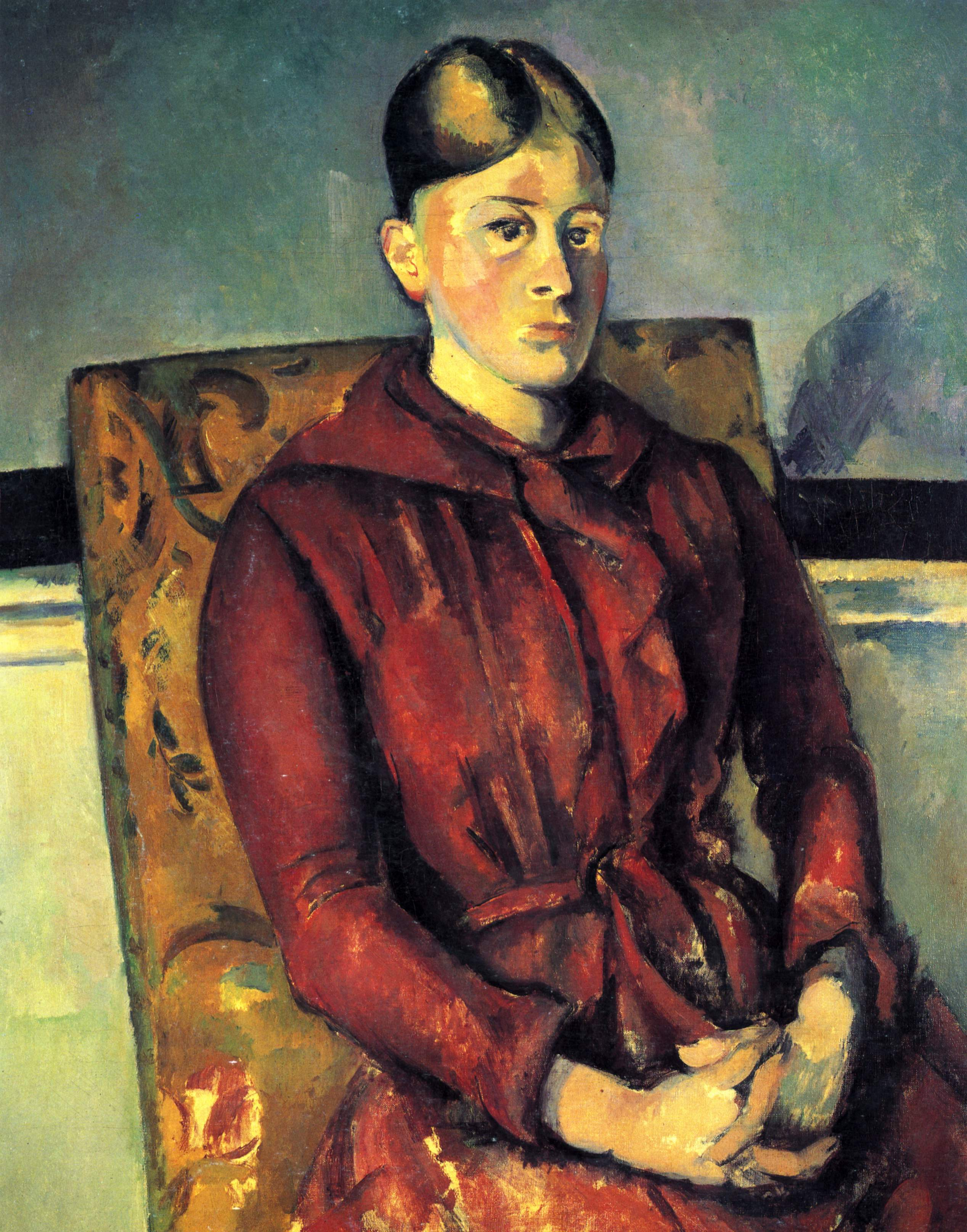
Portrait of Mme Cézanne in a yellow armchair, 1893–1895

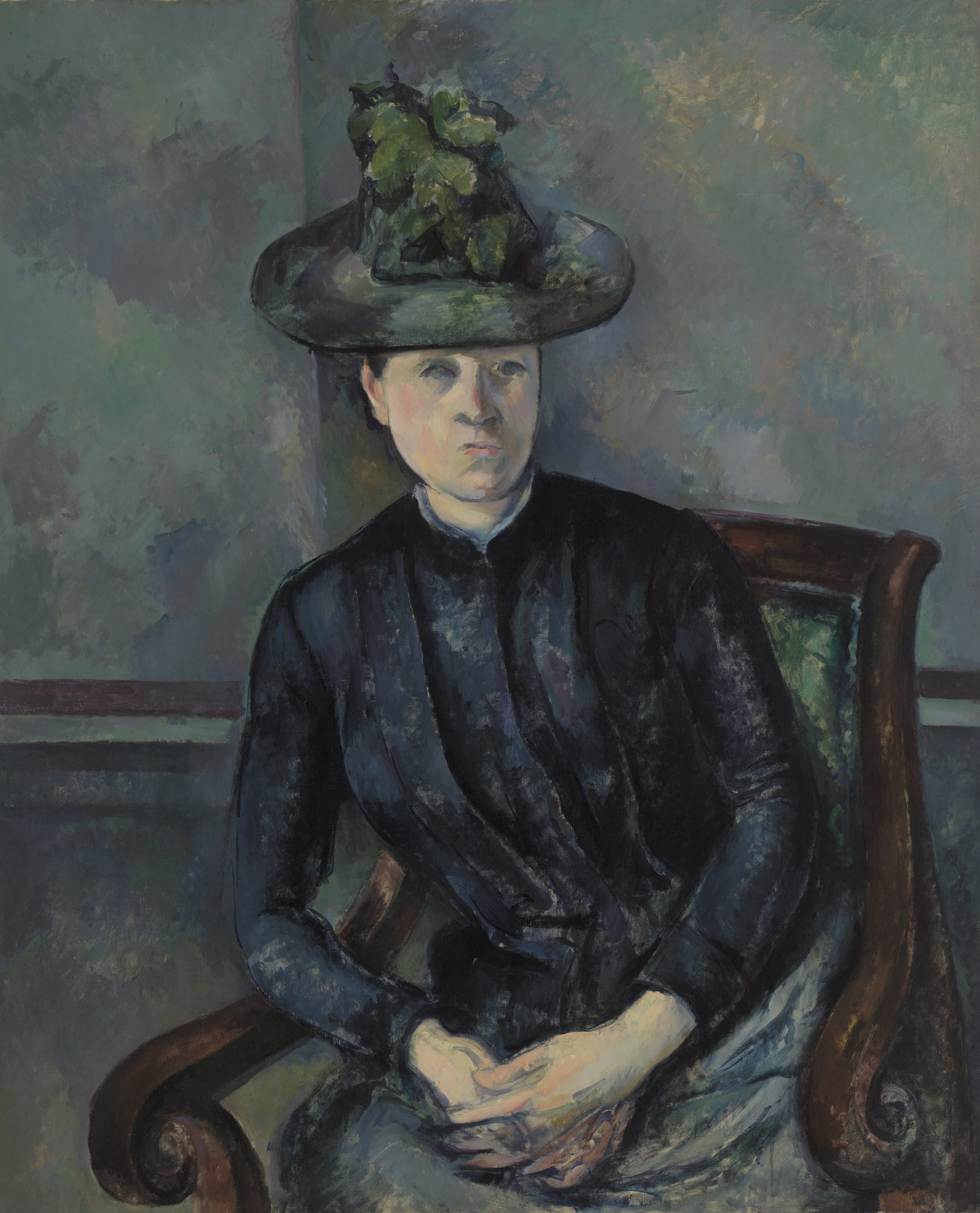
Woman in a Green Hat. Madame Cézanne, 1894–1895. Barnes Foundation

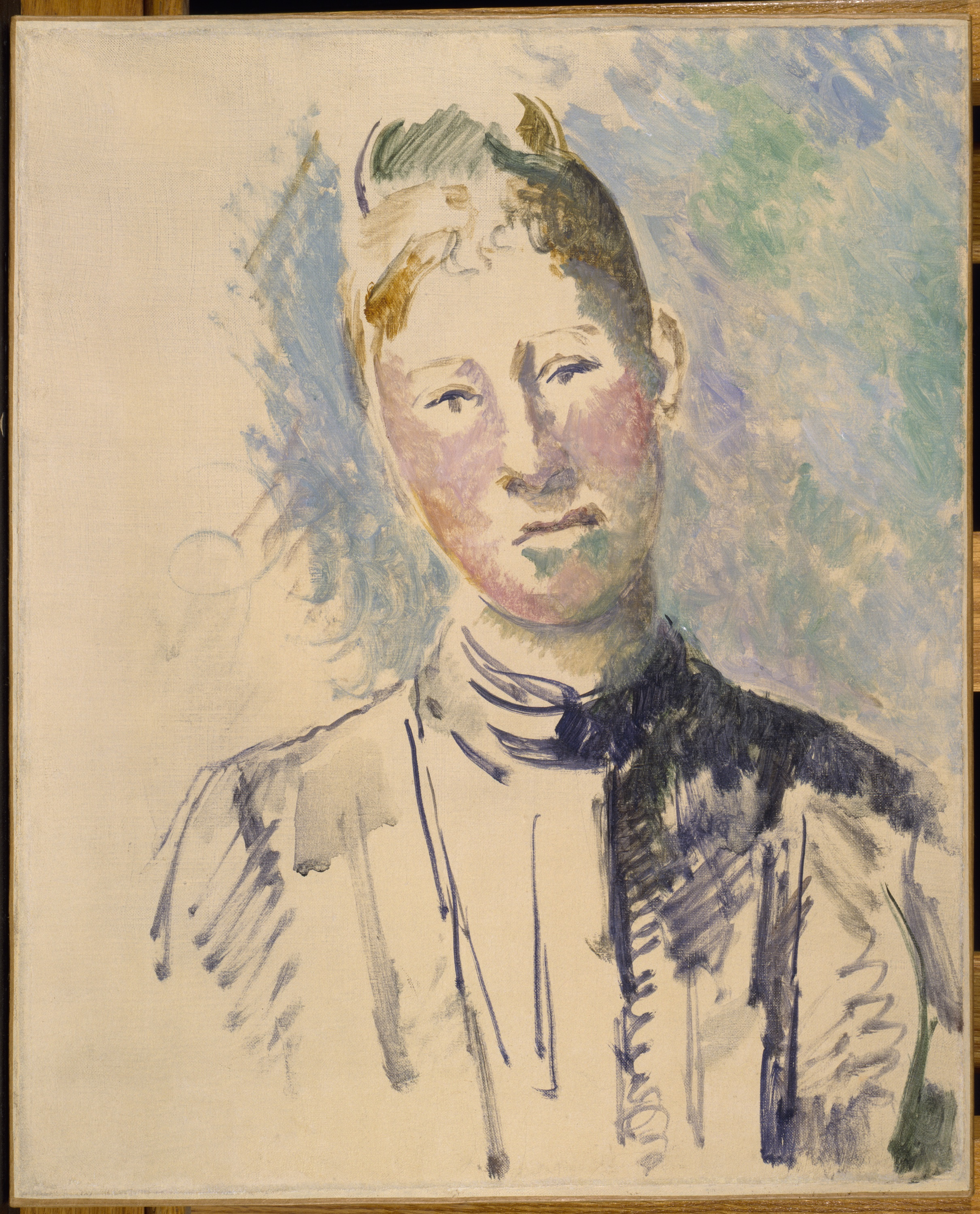
Madame Cézanne, 1885–87. Solomon R. Guggenheim Museum

== See also ==
- Portrait of Madame Cézanne (Roy Lichtenstein)

== Sources ==
- Garb, Tamar. The Painted Face, Portraits of Women in France 1814–1914. Yale University Press, 2007. ISBN 978-0-300-11118-7
- Lindsay, Jack. Cézanne: His Life and Art. Greenwich, Connecticut: New York Graphic Society, 1969
