= 2012 in Australian literature =

This article presents a list of the historical events and publications of Australian literature during 2012.

== Events ==
- Clive James is made a Commander of the Order of the British Empire for "services to literature and the media" in the Queen Elizabeth II's New Year Honours List.
- Five literary figures are named in the Australia Day Honours: Paul Brunton, Stuart Macintyre, Roy Masters, Ros Pesman and Carol Woodrow.
- Peter Carey is the recipient of the Bodleian Libraries' 2012 Bodley Medal. The medal is awarded by the Bodleian Libraries of the University of Oxford "to individuals who have made outstanding contributions to the worlds in which the Bodleian is active: literature, culture, science, and communication".
- Incoming Premier Campbell Newman cancels the Queensland Premier's Literary Awards.
- In response, a week later, the new Queensland Literary Awards are announced. The awards use a crowd-funding campaign to raise the prize-money for their initial set of awards.
- Sophie Cunningham is appointed as the new head of the Australian Literature Board.
- In the Queen's Birthday Honours, Peter Carey, Barbara Blackman, Rolf Harris, and Liz Jones were appointed Officers of the Order of Australia (AO), Grahame Bond and Peter Steele were appointed Members of the Order of Australia (AM), and Peter Singer was appointed Companion of the Order of Australia (AC).
- Text Publishing launches its Text Classics line, reprinting Australian literary classics.
- Melbourne City Council unveils "Literature Lane", a small laneway off Little LaTrobe Street near the State Library of Victoria, in recognition of Melbourne's status as a UNESCO City of Literature.
- The Grace Leven Prize for Poetry was discontinued.

== Major publications ==
=== Literary fiction ===
- Romy Ash – Floundering
- Murray Bail – The Voyage
- Peter Carey – The Chemistry of Tears
- Brian Castro – Street to Street
- Courtney Collins – The Burial
- Michelle de Kretser – Questions of Travel
- Annah Faulkner – The Beloved
- Susan Johnson – My Hundred Lovers
- Toni Jordan – Nine Days
- Tom Keneally – The Daughters of Mars
- Christopher Koch – Lost Voices
- Drusilla Modjeska – The Mountain
- Stephanie Radok – An Opening: twelve love stories about art
- Graeme Simsion – The Rosie Project
- M. L. Stedman – The Light Between Oceans
- Carrie Tiffany – Mateship with Birds
- Patrick White – The Hanging Garden
- Sue Woolfe – The Oldest Song in the World

=== Short stories ===
- Cate Kennedy – Like a House on Fire

=== Children's and Young Adult fiction ===
- Michael Gerard Bauer – Epic Fail
- Mem Fox
  - Good Night, Sleep Tight
  - Tell Me About Your Day Today
  - Two Little Monkeys
- Jackie French – Pennies for Hitler
- Morris Gleitzman – After
- Sonya Hartnett – Children of the King
- Steven Herrick – Pookie Aleera Is Not My Boyfriend
- Doug MacLeod – The Shiny Guys
- Emily Rodda – The Silver Door
- Carole Wilkinson – Blood Brothers

=== Science Fiction and Fantasy ===
- John Birmingham – Stalin's Hammer: Rome
- Trudi Canavan – The Traitor Queen
- Greg Egan – The Eternal Flame
- Will Elliott – Nightfall
- Jennifer Fallon – The Dark Divide
- Ian Irvine – Rebellion
- Margo Lanagan – Sea Hearts
- Jaclyn Moriarty – A Corner of White
- Garth Nix – A Confusion of Princes

=== Crime and Mystery ===
- Jessie Cole – Darkness on the Edge of Town
- Peter Corris – Comeback
- Kathryn Fox – Cold Grave
- Kerry Greenwood – Unnatural Habits
- Maggie Groff – Mad Men, Bad Girls and the Guerilla Knitters Institute
- Katherine Howell – Silent Fear
- L. A. Larkin – Thirst
- Gabrielle Lord – Death by Beauty
- Zane Lovitt – The Midnight Promise
- Colleen McCullough – The Prodigal Son
- Geoffrey McGeachin – Blackwattle Creek
- Adrian McKinty – The Cold, Cold Ground
- Tara Moss – Assassin
- Malla Nunn – Silent Valley
- Michael Robotham – Say You're Sorry

=== Poetry ===
- Rosemary Dobson – Collected
- Brook Emery — Collusion
- Kate Fagan – First Light
- Robert Gray – Cumulus: Collected Poems
- John Kinsella – Jam Tree Gully: Poems
- Kate Lilley – Ladylike
- Rhyll McMaster – Late Night Shopping
- Jennifer Maiden – Liquid Nitrogen
- Les Murray
  - The Best 100 Poems of Les Murray
  - The Quadrant Book of Poetry 2001–2010 (edited)
- John Shaw Neilson – Collected Verse of John Shaw Neilson
- Peter Rose – Crimson Crop
- Randolph Stow – The Land's Meaning: New Selected Poems (edited by John Kinsella)
- John Tranter ed. – The Best Australian Poems 2012

=== Biography ===
- John Bailey – Into the Unknown: The Tormented Life and Expeditions of Ludwig Leichhardt
- Daryl Dellora – Michael Kirby: Law, Love and Life
- Gideon Haigh – On Warne
- Jenny Hocking – Gough Whitlam: His Time: Volume 2
- J. C. Kannemeyer – J. M. Coetzee: A Life in Writing
- Malcolm Knox – Bradman's War: How the 1948 Invincibles Turned the Cricket Pitch into a Battlefield
- Mungo MacCallum – The Good, the Bad and the Unlikely: Australia's Prime Ministers
- David McKnight – Rupert Murdoch: An Investigation of Political Power
- Brenda Niall – True North: The Story of Mary and Elizabeth Durack

=== Non-fiction ===
- Kerry Greenwood – Tamam Shud: The Somerton Man Mystery

=== Drama ===
- Ian Meadows – Between Two Waves
- Tee O'Neill – Barassi

== Awards and honours ==
=== Lifetime achievement ===
Award	Author
Christopher Brennan Award	Tim Thorne
Melbourne Prize for Literature	Alex Miller
Patrick White Award	Amanda Lohrey

=== Literary ===
Award	Author	Title	Publisher
The Age Book of the Year	James Boyce	1835: The Founding of Melbourne & The Conquest of Australia	Black Inc
ALS Gold Medal	Gillian Mears	Foal's Bread	Allen & Unwin
Colin Roderick Award	Thomas Keneally	The Daughters of Mars	Random House
Indie Book Awards Book of the Year	Anna Funder	All That I Am	Penguin Books
Nita Kibble Literary Award	Gail Jones	Five Bells	Vintage Books
Victorian Prize for Literature	Bill Gammage	The Biggest Estate on Earth	Allen & Unwin

=== Fiction ===
==== International ====
Award	Region	Author	Title	Publisher
Commonwealth Book Prize	Pacific	Cory Taylor	Me and Mr Booker	Text Publishing

==== National ====
Award	Author	Title	Publisher
Adelaide Festival Awards for Literature	Kim Scott	That Deadman Dance	Picador
The Age Book of the Year Award	Gillian Mears	Foal's Bread	Allen & Unwin
The Australian/Vogel Literary Award	Paul D. Carter	Eleven Seasons	Allen & Unwin
Barbara Jefferis Award	Anna Funder	All That I Am	Penguin Books
Indie Book Awards Book of the Year – Fiction	Elliot Perlman	The Street Sweeper	Vintage Books
Indie Book Awards Book of the Year – Debut Fiction	Anna Funder	All That I Am	Penguin Books
Miles Franklin Award	Anna Funder	All That I Am	Penguin Books
Prime Minister's Literary Awards	Gillian Mears	Foal's Bread	Allen & Unwin
New South Wales Premier's Literary Awards	Kim Scott	That Deadman Dance	Picador
Queensland Literary Awards	Frank Moorhouse	Cold Light	Vintage Australia
Victorian Premier's Literary Award	Gillian Mears	Foal's Bread	Allen & Unwin
Western Australian Premier's Book Awards	Michelle de Kretser	Questions of Travel	Allen & Unwin

=== Children and Young Adult ===
==== National ====
Award	Category	Author	Title	Publisher
Children's Book of the Year Award	Older Readers	Scott Gardner	The Dead I Know	Allen & Unwin
Children's Book of the Year Award	Younger Readers	Kate Constable	Crow Country	Allen & Unwin
Children's Book of the Year Award	Picture Book	Bob Graham	A Bus Called Heaven	Walker Books
Children's Book of the Year Award	Early Childhood	Nick Bland, illus. Freya Blackwood	Maudie Bear	Scholastic Press
Indie Book Awards Book of the Year	Children's & YA	Anh Do & Suzanne Do & Bruce Whatley (Illus)	The Little Refugee	Allen & Unwin
New South Wales Premier's Literary Awards	Children's	Kate Constable	Crow Country	Allen & Unwin
New South Wales Premier's Literary Awards	Young People's	Penni Russon	Only Ever Always	Allen & Unwin
Queensland Literary Awards	Children's	Briony Stewart	Kumiko and the Shadow Catchers	University of Queensland Press
Queensland Literary Awards	Young Adult	Neil Grant	The Ink Bridge	Allen & Unwin
Victorian Premier's Literary Award	Young Adult Fiction	John Larkin	The Shadow Girl	Random House
Western Australian Premier's Book Awards	Children's	Stephen Herrick	Pookie Aleera Is Not My Boyfriend	University of Queensland Press
Western Australian Premier's Book Awards	Children's	Peter Macinnis	Australian Backyard Naturalist	National Library of Australia
Western Australian Premier's Book Awards	Writing for Young Adults	Margo Lanagan	Sea Hearts	Allen and Unwin

=== Crime and Mystery ===
==== National ====
Award	Category	Author	Title	Publisher
Davitt Award	Novel	Sulari Gentill	A Decline in Prophets	Pantera Press
Davitt Award	Young adult novel	Meg McKinlay	Surface Tension	Walker Books
Davitt Award	True crime	Liz Porter	Cold Case Files: Past Crimes Solved by New Forensic Science	Pan Macmillan
Davitt Award	Debut novel	Jaye Ford	Beyond Fear	Bantam Books
Davitt Award	Readers' choice	YA Erskine	The Brotherhood	Bantam Books
Davitt Award	Readers' choice	Jaye Ford	Beyond Fear	Bantam Books
Ned Kelly Award	Novel	J. C. Burke	Pig Boy	Random House Australia
Ned Kelly Award	First novel	Peter Twohig	The Cartographer	Fourth Estate
Ned Kelly Award	True crime	Eamonn Duff	Sins of the Father: The Untold Story Behind Schapelle Corby's Ill-Fated Drug Run	Allen & Unwin
Ned Kelly Award	Life achievement	Gabrielle Lord		

=== Science fiction ===
Award	Category	Author	Title	Publisher
Aurealis Award	SF Novel	Daniel O'Malley	The Rook	HarperCollins
Aurealis Award	SF Short Story	Margo Lanagan	"Significant Dust"	Twelfth Planet Press (Cracklescape)
Aurealis Award	Fantasy Novel	Margo Lanagan	Sea Hearts	Allen & Unwin
Aurealis Award	Fantasy Short Story	Margo Lanagan	"Bajazzle"	Twelfth Planet Press (Cracklescape)
Aurealis Award	Horror Novel	Kirstyn McDermott	Perfections	Xuom
Aurealis Award	Horror Short Story	Kaaron Warren	"Sky"	Twelfth Planet Press (Through Splintered Walls)
Aurealis Award	Anthology	Jonathan Strahan	The Best Science Fiction & Fantasy of the Year Volume 6	Night Shade Books
Aurealis Award	Collection	K. J. Bishop	That Book Your Mad Ancestor Wrote	K. J. Bishop
Australian Shadows Awards	Novel	Kirstyn McDermott	Perfections	Xoum
Australian Shadows Awards	Long Fiction	Kaaron Warren	"Sky"	Through Splintered Walls: A Twelve Planets Collection edited by Alisa Krasnostein
Australian Shadows Awards	Short Fiction	Martin J. Livings	"Birthday Suit"	Living with the Dead by Martin J. Livings
Australian Shadows Awards	Edited Publication	Craig Bezant, editor	Surviving The End	Dark Prints Press
Australian Shadows Awards	Collected Works	Kaaron Warren	Through Splintered Walls: A Twelve Planets Collection	Twelfth Planet Press
Ditmar Award	Novel	Kim Westwood	The Courier's New Bicycle	HarperVoyager
Ditmar Award	Novella/Novelette	Paul Haines	"The Past is a Bridge Best Left Burnt"	The Last Days of Kali Yuga
Ditmar Award	Short Story	Tansy Rayner Roberts	"The Patrician"	Love and Romanpunk
Ditmar Award	Collected Work	Paul Haines	The Last Days of Kali Yuga	Brimstone

=== Poetry ===
Award	Author	Title	Publisher
Adelaide Festival Awards for Literature	Les Murray	Taller When Prone	Black Inc Publishing
The Age Book of the Year	Mal McKimmie	The Brokenness Sonnets I-III And Other Poems	Five Islands Press
Anne Elder Award	Elizabeth Allen	Body Language	Vagabond Press
Grace Leven Prize for Poetry	Toby Fitch	Rawshock	Puncher and Wattmann
Grace Leven Prize for Poetry	Michael Brennan	Autoethnographic	Giramondo Publishing
Grace Leven Prize for Poetry	Laurie Duggan	The Collected Blue Hills	Puncher and Wattmann
Grace Leven Prize for Poetry	John Kinsella	Jaguar's Dream	Alma Books
Grace Leven Prize for Poetry	Michael Sharkey	Another Fine Morning in Paradise	Five Island Press
Mary Gilmore Prize	Fiona Wright	Knuckled	Giramondo Publishing
Prime Minister's Literary Awards	Luke Davies	Interferon Psalms	Allen and Unwin
New South Wales Premier's Literary Awards	Gig Ryan	New and Selected Poems	Giramondo Publishing
Queensland Literary Awards	Peter Rose	Crimson Crop	UWA Publishing
Victorian Premier's Literary Award	John Kinsella	Armour	Picador
Western Australian Premier's Book Awards	Robert Gray	Cumulus	John Leonard Press

=== Drama ===
Award	Category	Author	Title	Publisher
New South Wales Premier's Literary Awards	Play	Joanna Murray-Smith	The Gift	Melbourne Theatre Company
New South Wales Premier's Literary Awards	Play	Vanessa Bates	Porn.Cake	Beckett Theatre, Melbourne
New South Wales Premier's Literary Awards	Script	Peter Duncan	Rake (Episode 1): "R v Murray"	ABC Television
Patrick White Playwrights' Award	Award	Anna Barnes	Minus One Sister	Griffin Theatre Company
Patrick White Playwrights' Award	Fellowship	Hilary Bell		

=== Non-Fiction ===
Award	Category	Author	Title	Publisher
Adelaide Festival Awards for Literature	Non-fiction	Mark McKenna	An Eye for Eternity: The Life of Manning Clark	Miegunyah Press
The Age Book of the Year	Non-fiction	James Boyce	1835: The Founding of Melbourne & The Conquest of Australia	Black Inc.
Children's Book of the Year Award	Eve Pownall Award for Information Books	Alison Lester and Coral Tulloch	One Small Island: The Story of Macquarie Island	Penguin Group
Davitt Award	True crime	Liz Porter	Cold Case Files: Past crimes solved by new forensic science	Pan Macmillan
National Biography Award	Biography	Martin Thomas	The Many Worlds of R. H. Mathews: In Search of an Australian Anthropologist	Allen & Unwin
Indie Book Awards Book of the Year	Non-Fiction	William McInnes & Sarah Watt	Worse Things Happen at Sea	Hachette
Prime Minister's Literary Awards	Non-fiction	Mark McKenna	An Eye for Eternity: The Live of Manning Clark	Melbourne University Publishing
New South Wales Premier's Literary Awards	Non-fiction	Mark McKenna	An Eye for Eternity: The Live of Manning Clark	Melbourne University Publishing
New South Wales Premier's History Awards	Australian History	Russell McGregor	Indifferent Inclusion: Aboriginal People and the Australian Nation	Aboriginal Studies Press
New South Wales Premier's History Awards	Community and Regional History	Deborah Beck	Set in Stone: A History of the Cell Block Theatre	UNSW Press
New South Wales Premier's History Awards	General History	Tim Bonyhady	Good Living Street: The Fortunes of My Viennese Family	Allen & Unwin
New South Wales Premier's History Awards	Young People's	Stephanie Owen Reeder	Amazing Grace: An Adventure at Sea	National Library of Australia
Queensland Literary Awards	Non-fiction	Robin De Crespigny	The People Smuggler	Penguin Group
Queensland Literary Awards	History	Bill Gammage	The Biggest Estate on Earth: How Aborigines Made Australia	Allen & Unwin
Victorian Premier's Literary Award	Non-fiction	Bill Gammage	The Biggest Estate on Earth: How Aborigines Made Australia	Allen & Unwin
Western Australian Premier's Book Awards	Non-fiction	Roger Averill	Exile: The Lives and Hopes of Werner Pelz	Transit Lounge
Western Australian Premier's Book Awards	Western Australian history	edited by Anne Scrimgeour; transcribed and translated by Barbara Hale, Mark Clendon	Kurlumarniny: We come from the Desert	Aboriginal Studies Press

== Deaths ==
- 14 April – Bruce Bennett, literary academic (born 1941)
- 18 June – Don Charlwood, writer (born 1915)
- 24 June – Ralph Elliott, critic and academic (born 1921)
- 27 June –
  - Rosemary Dobson, poet (born 1920)
  - Peter Steele, poet (born 1939)
- 6 August – Robert Hughes, writer and critic (born 1938)
- 20 September – Robert G. Barrett, novelist (born 1942)
- 14 October – Max Fatchen, writer for children (born 1920)
- 22 November – Bryce Courtenay, novelist (born 1933 in Johannesburg)

== See also ==
- 2012 in Australia
- 2012 in literature
- 2012 in poetry
- List of years in Australian literature
- List of years in literature
- List of Australian literary awards
