= 2013 in Australian literature =

This article presents a list of the historical events and publications of Australian literature during 2013.

== Events ==
- James Ley launches the Sydney Review of Books to provide "an opportunity for Australia's critics to rediscover the art of literary criticism".
- The longlist for the inaugural Stella Prize is announced.
- The shortlist of the Miles Franklin Award contains only female writers for the first time.
- Nicole Bourke, writing under the pseudonym "N. A. Sulway", becomes the first Australian writer to win the James Tiptree, Jr. Award for her novel Rupetta.
- Aora Children's Literature Research Centre in Sydney closes after 12 years of operation.
- The Commonwealth Book Prize was discontinuted after 2013.

== Major publications ==
=== Literary fiction ===
- Debra Adelaide – Letter to George Clooney
- Steven Carroll – A World of Other People
- J. M. Coetzee – The Childhood of Jesus
- Blanche d'Alpuget – The Young Lion
- Richard Flanagan – The Narrow Road to the Deep North
- Andrea Goldsmith – The Memory Trap
- Ashley Hay – The Railwayman's Wife
- Tom Keneally – Shame and the Captives
- Hannah Kent – Burial Rites
- Melissa Lucashenko – Mullumbimby
- Colleen McCullough – Bittersweet
- Fiona McFarlane – The Night Guest
- Alex Miller – Coal Creek
- Liane Moriarty – The Husband's Secret
- Di Morrissey – The Winter Sea
- Cory Taylor – My Beautiful Enemy
- Christos Tsiolkas – Barracuda
- Felicity Volk – Lightning
- Tim Winton – Eyrie
- Alexis Wright – The Swan Book
- Evie Wyld – All The Birds, Singing

=== Children's and young adult fiction ===
- A. J. Betts – Zac & Mia
- Alyssa Brugman – Alex as Well
- J. C. Burke – Pretty Girl
- Felicity Castagna – The Incredible Here and Now
- Mem Fox
  - Baby Bedtime
  - Yoo-hoo, Ladybird!
- Kerry Greenwood – Evan's Gallipoli: A Gripping Story of Unlikely Friendship and an Incredible Journey behind Enemy Lines
- Richard Harland – Song of the Slums
- Karen Healey – When We Wake
- Melissa Keil – Life in Outer Space
- Tania McCartney – An Aussie Year: Twelve Months in the Life of Australian Kids
- James Phelan – 13
- Fiona Wood – Wildlife

=== Science fiction and fantasy ===
- Max Barry – Lexicon
- Greg Egan
  - The Arrows of Time
  - "Zero for Conduct"
- Jennifer Fallon – Reunion
- Traci Harding – Dreaming of Zhou Gong
- Simon Haynes – Hal Spacejock: Safe Art
- Fiona McIntosh – The Scrivener's Tale
- Juliet Marillier – The Caller
- N. A. Sulway – Rupetta

=== Crime and mystery ===
- Honey Brown – Dark Horse
- Peter Corris – The Dunbar Case
- Garry Disher – Bitter Wash Road
- Karen Foxlee – The Midnight Dress
- Poppy Gee – Bay of Fires
- Katherine Howell – Web of Deceit
- Stuart Littlemore —Harry Curry: Rats and Mice
- Adrian McKinty – I Hear the Sirens in the Street
- Barry Maitland – The Raven's Eye
- Matthew Reilly – The Tournament
- Michael Robotham – Watching You
- Angela Savage – The Dying Beach
- David Whish-Wilson – Zero at the Bone
- Chris Womersley – Cairo

=== Poetry ===
- Pamela Brown – Home by Dark
- Lisa Gorton
  - The Best Australian Poems 2013
  - Hotel Hyperion
- John Kinsella – The Vision of Error: A Sextet of Activist Poems
- Kate Middleton – Ephemeral Waters
- Geoff Page
  - 1953
  - New Selected Poems
- Dorothy Porter – The Best 100 Poems of Dorothy Porter
- Chris Wallace-Crabbe – New and Selected Poems

=== Biography ===
- Alison Alexander – The Ambitions of Jane Franklin: Victorian Lady Adventurer
- Andrew Burell – Twiggy: The High-Stakes Life of Andrew Forest
- Gabrielle Carey – Moving Among Strangers: Randolph Stow and My Family
- Matthew Condon – Three Crooked Kings
- David Day – Flaws in the Ice: In Search of Douglas Mawson
- Stephen Dando-Collins – Sir Henry Parkes: The Australian Colossus
- Jesse Fink – The Youngs: The Brothers Who Built AC/DC
- Peter FitzSimons – Ned Kelly: The Story of Australia's Most Notorious Legend
- David Marr – The Prince: Faith, Abuse and George Pell
- Kristina Olsson – Boy, Lost: A Family Memoir
- Michael Pembroke – Arthur Phillip: Sailor, Mercenary, Governor, Spy
- Margaret Simons – Kerry Stokes: Self-Made Man
- Helen Trinca – Madeleine: A Life of Madeleine St. John
- Clare Wright – The Forgotten Rebels of Eureka

=== Non-fiction ===
- Paul Barry – Breaking News : Sex, Lies & the Murdoch Succession
- Susanna de Vries – Australian Heroines of World War One: Gallipoli, Lemnos and the Western Front
- John Safran – Murder in Mississippi: The True Story of How I Met a White Supremacist, Befriended His Black Killer and Wrote this Book

== Awards and honours ==
=== Lifetime achievement ===
Award	Author
Christopher Brennan Award	Judith Beveridge
Patrick White Award	Louis Nowra

=== Literary ===
Award	Author	Title	Publisher
ALS Gold Medal	Michelle de Kretser	Questions of Travel	Allen & Unwin
Colin Roderick Award	Ashley Hay	The Railwayman's Wife	Allen & Unwin
Colin Roderick Award	Stephen Edgar	Eldershaw	Black Pepper
Indie Book Awards Book of the Year	M. L. Stedman	The Light Between Oceans	Vintage Australia
Nita Kibble Literary Award	Annah Faulkner	The Beloved	Picador
Stella Prize	Carrie Tiffany	Mateship with Birds	Pan Macmillan
Victorian Prize for Literature	Not awarded		

=== Fiction ===
==== International ====
Award	Region	Author	Title	Publisher
Commonwealth Book Prize	Pacific	Michael Sala	The Last Thread	Affirm Press

==== National ====
Award	Author	Title	Publisher
Adelaide Festival Awards for Literature	Not awarded		
The Australian/Vogel Literary Award	Not awarded		
Barbara Jefferis Award	Not awarded		
Indie Book Awards Book of the Year – Fiction	Toni Jordan	Nine Days	Text Publishing
Indie Book Awards Book of the Year – Debut Fiction	M. L. Stedman	The Light Between Oceans	Vintage Australia
Miles Franklin Award	Michelle de Kretser	Questions of Travel	Allen & Unwin
Prime Minister's Literary Awards	Michelle de Kretser	Questions of Travel	Allen & Unwin
New South Wales Premier's Literary Awards	Carrie Tiffany	Mateship with Birds	Pan Macmillan
Queensland Literary Awards	Melissa Lucashenko	Mullumbimby	University of Queensland Press
Victorian Premier's Literary Awards	Not awarded		
Western Australian Premier's Book Awards	Not awarded		

=== Children and young adult ===
==== National ====
Award	Category	Author	Title	Publisher
Children's Book of the Year Award	Older Readers	Margo Lanagan	Sea Hearts	Allen and Unwin
Children's Book of the Year Award	Younger Readers	Sonya Hartnett	The Children of the King	Viking Books
Children's Book of the Year Award	Picture Book	Ron Brooks and Julie Hunt	The Coat	Allen and Unwin
Children's Book of the Year Award	Early Childhood	Emma Allen, illus. Freya Blackwood	The Terrible Suitcase	Scholastic Press, Scholastic Australia
Indie Book Awards Book of the Year	Children's & YA	Margo Lanagan	Sea Hearts	Allen & Unwin
New South Wales Premier's Literary Awards	Children's	Aaron Blabey	The Ghost of Miss Annabel Spoon	Penguin Books
New South Wales Premier's Literary Awards	Young People's	Jaclyn Moriarty	A Corner of White	Pan Macmillan
Queensland Literary Awards	Children's	Narelle Oliver	Don't Let a Spoonbill in the Kitchen!	Omnibus Books
Queensland Literary Awards	Young Adult	Jaclyn Moriarty	A Corner of White	Pan Macmillan
Victorian Premier's Literary Award	Young Adult Fiction	No award		
Western Australian Premier's Book Awards	Children's	Dianne Wolfer, illus. by Brian Simmonds	Light Horse Boy	Fremantle Press
Western Australian Premier's Book Awards	Children's	Jan Ormerod, illus. by Andrew Joyner	The Swap	Hardie Grant
Western Australian Premier's Book Awards	Writing for Young Adults	Alyssa Brugman	Alex As Well	Text Publishing

=== Crime and mystery ===
==== National ====
Award	Category	Author	Title	Publisher
Davitt Award	Novel	Maggie Groff	Mad Men, Bad Girls and the Guerilla Knitters Institute	Pan Macmillan
Davitt Award	Young adult novel	Jennifer Walsh	The Tunnels of Tarcoola	Allen & Unwin
Davitt Award	True Crime	Pamela Burton	The Waterlow Killings	Melbourne University Press
Davitt Award	Debut novel	Maggie Groff	Mad Men, Bad Girls and the Guerilla Knitters Institute	Pan Macmillan
Davitt Award	Readers' choice	Kerry Greenwood	Tamam Shud: The Somerton Man Mystery	NewSouth Publishing
Ned Kelly Award	Novel	Geoffrey McGeachin	Blackwattle Creek	Penguin Books
Ned Kelly Award	First novel	Zane Lovitt	The Midnight Promise	Text Publishing
Ned Kelly Award	True crime	Robin de Crespigny	The People Smuggler	Viking
Ned Kelly Award	Lifetime Achievement	Not awarded		

=== Science fiction ===
Award	Category	Author	Title	Publisher
Aurealis Award	SF Novel	Max Barry	Lexicon	Hachette
Aurealis Award	SF Short Story	Kaaron Warren	"Air, Water, and the Grove"	Pandemonimum Press (The Lowest Heaven)
Aurealis Award	Fantasy Novel	Mitchell Hogan	A Crucible of Souls	Mitchell Hogan
Aurealis Award	Fantasy Short Story	Jay Kristoff	"The Last Stormdancer"	Thomas Dunne Books
Aurealis Award	Horror Novel	Allyse Near	Fairytales for Wilde Girls	Random House Australia
Aurealis Award	Horror Short Story	Kim Wilkins	"The Year of Ancient Ghosts"	Ticonderoga Publications (The Year of Ancient Ghosts)
Aurealis Award	Anthology	Liz Grzyb & Talie Helene	The Year's Best Australian Fantasy and Horror	Ticonderoga Publications
Aurealis Award	Anthology	Tehani Wessely	One Small Step, An Anthology of Discoveries	FableCroft Publishing
Aurealis Award	Collection	Joanne Anderton	The Bone Chime Song and Other Stories	FableCroft Publishing
Australian Shadows Awards	Novel	Marty Young	809 Jacob Street	Black Beacon Books
Australian Shadows Awards	Long Fiction	Kaaron Warren	"The Unwanted Women of Surrey"	Queen Victoria's Book of Spells: An Anthology of Gaslamp Fantasy edited by Ellen Datlow and Terri Windling
Australian Shadows Awards	Short Fiction	Debbie Cowens	"Caterpillars"	Baby Teeth: Bite-sized Tales of Terror edited by Dan Rabarts and Lee Murray
Australian Shadows Awards	Edited Publication	Dan Rabarts and Lee Murray, editors	Baby Teeth: Bite-sized Tales of Terror	Paper Road Press
Australian Shadows Awards	Collected Works	Jo Anderton	The Bone Chime Song and other stories	FableCroft Publishing
Ditmar Award	Novel	Margo Lanagan	Sea Hearts	Allen & Unwin
Ditmar Award	Novella/Novelette	Kaaron Warren	"Sky"	Twelfth Planet Press (Through Splintered Walls)
Ditmar Award	Short Story	Thoraiya Dyer	"The Wisdom of Ants"	Clarkesworld 75
Ditmar Award	Collected Work	Kaaron Warren, edited by Alisa Krasnostein	Through Splintered Walls	Twelfth Planet Press

=== Poetry ===
Award	Author	Title	Publisher
Adelaide Festival Awards for Literature	Not awarded		
Anne Elder Award	Elizabeth Allen	Body Language	Vagabond Press
Mary Gilmore Prize	Not awarded		
Prime Minister's Literary Awards	John Kinsella	Jam Tree Gully: Poems	W. W. Norton
New South Wales Premier's Literary Awards	Ali Cobby Eckermann	Ruby Moonlight	Magabala Books
Queensland Literary Awards	John Kinsella	Jam Tree Gully: Poems	W. W. Norton
Victorian Premier's Literary Award	Not awarded		
Western Australian Premier's Book Awards	Not awarded		

=== Drama ===
Award	Category	Author	Title	Publisher
New South Wales Premier's Literary Awards	Play	Reg Cribb	The Damned	The Yellow Agency
New South Wales Premier's Literary Awards	Script	Louise Fox	Dead Europe	See Saw Films; Porchlight Films
Patrick White Playwrights' Award	Award	Chris Summers	King Artur	
Patrick White Playwrights' Award	Fellowship	Angela Betzien		

=== Non-fiction ===
Award	Category	Author	Title	Publisher
Adelaide Festival Awards for Literature	Non-Fiction	Not awarded		
Children's Book of the Year Award	Eve Pownall Award for Information Books	Kristin Weidenbach, illus. Timothy Ide	Tom the Outback Mailman	Lothian Children's Books, Hachette Australia
Davitt Award	True crime	Pamela Burton	The Waterlow Killings	Melbourne University Publishing
Indie Book Awards Book of the Year	Non-Fiction	Richard de Crespigny	QF32	Pan Macmillan
National Biography Award	Biography	Peter Fitzpatrick	The Two Frank Thrings	Monash University Publishing
Prime Minister's Literary Awards	Non-fiction	George Megalogenis	The Australian Moment	Penguin Books
New South Wales Premier's Literary Awards	Non-fiction	Gideon Haigh	The Office: A Hard Working History	Miegunyah
New South Wales Premier's History Awards	Australian History	Janet Butler	Kitty's War: The remarkable wartime experiences of Kit McNaughton	University of Queensland Press
New South Wales Premier's History Awards	Community and Regional History	Patti Miller	The Mind of a Thief	University of Queensland Press
New South Wales Premier's History Awards	General History	Saliha Belmessous	Assimilation and Empire: Uniformity in the French and British Colonies, 1541–1954	Oxford University Press
New South Wales Premier's History Awards	Young People's	Jackie French	Pennies for Hitler	HarperCollins
Queensland Literary Awards	Non-fiction	Kristina Olsson	Boy, Lost	University of Queensland Press
Queensland Literary Awards	History	Jane Lydon	The Flash of Recognition	New South Books
Victorian Premier's Literary Award	Non-fiction	Not awarded		
Western Australian Premier's Book Awards	Non-fiction	Kristina Olsson	Boy, Lost	University of Queensland Press
Western Australian Premier's Book Awards	Western Australian history	Margaret Simons	Kerry Stokes: Self-Made Man	Penguin Books

== Deaths ==
- 23 May – Hazel Hawke, memoirist (born 1929)
- 16 July – Christopher Koch, novelist (born 1932)
- 5 September – Elisabeth Wynhausen, Dutch-born journalist and author (born 1946)
- 11 September – Keith Dunstan, journalist and author (born 1925)
- 9 October – Mark "Chopper" Read, writer (born 1954)
- 16 November – Graham Stone, bibliographer (born 1926)

== See also ==
- 2013 in Australia
- 2013 in literature
- 2013 in poetry
- List of years in Australian literature
- List of years in literature
- List of Australian literary awards
