= 2011 in Australian literature =

This article presents a list of the historical events and publications of Australian literature during 2011.

== Events ==
- Four authors are named in the Queen's Birthday Honours: Peter FitzSimons, Susanne Gervay, Roland Perry, and Chris Wallace-Crabbe
- Thomas Keneally donates his personal library to the Sydney Mechanics' School of Arts
- Australian libraries and library associations join together to make 2012 the National Year of Reading
- Australian Booksellers Association (ABA) declares Saturday, 20 August 2011, the inaugural National Bookshop Day
- Final issue of the "Australian Literary Review" to be published in October 2011
- Hannie Rayson is the first Australian to be awarded a commission with New York’s Manhattan Theatre Club
- Friends and family of biographer Hazel Rowley establish funds to commemorate Rowley’s life and her writing legacy via the Hazel Rowley Literary Fund
- Alison Lester and Boori Monty Pryor are appointed to be Australia’s first Children’s Laureates
- The University of Technology Sydney (UTS) appoints Robert Adamson to hold the inaugural CAL Chair in Australian Poetry

== Major publications ==
=== Literary fiction ===
- Tony Birch – Blood
- Geraldine Brooks – Caleb's Crossing
- Annah Faulkner – The Beloved
- Anna Funder – All That I Am
- Kate Grenville – Sarah Thornhill
- Gail Jones – Five Bells
- Jeanine Leane – Purple Threads
- Gillian Mears – Foal's Bread
- Alex Miller – Autumn Laing
- Frank Moorhouse – Cold Light
- Liane Moriarty – The Hypnotist's Love Story
- Favel Parrett – Past The Shallows
- Elliot Perlman – The Street Sweeper
- Craig Sherborne – The Amateur Science of Love
- Cory Taylor – Me and Mr Booker
- Rohan Wilson – The Roving Party
- Charlotte Wood – Animal People

=== Children's and Young Adult fiction ===
- Alexandra Adornetto – Hades
- Em Bailey – Shift
- J. C. Burke – Pig Boy
- Isobelle Carmody – The Sending
- Ursula Dubosarsky – The Golden Day
- Scott Gardner – The Dead I Know
- Andy Griffiths - The 13-Storey Treehouse
- Steven Herrick – Black Painted Fingernails
- Andrew McGahan – The Coming of the Whirlpool
- Melina Marchetta – Froi of the Exiles
- Vikki Wakefield – All I Ever Wanted
- Scott Westerfeld – Goliath

=== Science fiction and fantasy ===
- Max Barry – Machine Man
- Trudi Canavan – The Rogue
- Greg Egan – The Clockwork Rocket
- Will Elliott – Shadow
- Kim Falconer – Road to the Soul
- Pamela Freeman – Ember and Ash
- Richard Harland – Liberator
- Glenda Larke – Stormlord's Exile
- Kim Westwood – The Courier's New Bicycle

=== Crime and mystery ===
- Alan Carter – Prime Cut
- Peter Corris – Follow the Money
- Garry Disher – Whispering Death
- Sulari Gentill – A Decline in Prophets
- Kerry Greenwood – Cooking the Books
- Malcolm Knox – The Life
- Stuart Littlemore – Harry Curry: Counsel of Choice
- Barry Maitland – Chelsea Mansions
- Kel Robertson – Rip Off
- Michael Robotham – The Wreckage

=== Poetry ===
- Ali Alizadeh – Ashes in the Air
- Joanne Burns – Amphora
- Luke Davies – Interferon Psalms
- Barry Hill – Lines for Birds: Poems and Paintings
- John Kinsella – Armour
- Geoffrey Lehmann and Robert Gray – Australian Poetry Since 1788 (edited)
- Jaya Savige – Surface to Air

=== Biography ===
- Julian Assange – Julian Assange: The Unauthorised Autobiography
- A. J. Brown – Michael Kirby: Paradoxes and Principles
- Eileen Chanin – Book Life: The Life and Times of David Scott Mitchell 1836–1907
- Raimond Gaita – After Romulus
- Mark McKenna – An Eye for Eternity: The Life of Manning Clark
- Susan Mitchell – Tony Abbott: A Man's Man
- Christine Nixon – Fair Cop
- Sue Pieters-Hawke – Hazel: My Mother's Story
- Alice Pung – Her Father's Daughter
- David Robert Walker – Not Dark Yet: A Personal History
- Sarah Watt & William McInnes – Worse Things Happen at Sea

== Awards and honours ==
=== Lifetime achievement ===
Award	Author
Christopher Brennan Award	Jennifer Harrison
Patrick White Award	Robert Adamson

=== Literary ===
Award	Author	Title	Publisher
The Age Book of the Year	Fiona Kelly McGregor	Indelible Ink	Scribe Publishing
ALS Gold Medal	Kim Scott	That Deadman Dance	Picador
Colin Roderick Award	Karen Kissane	Worst of Days: Inside the Black Saturday Firestorm	Hachette Australia
Indie Book Awards Book of the Year	Anh Do	The Happiest Refugee	Allen & Unwin
Nita Kibble Literary Award	Brenda Walker	Reading by Moonlight	Hamish Hamilton
Victorian Prize for Literature	Kim Scott	That Deadman Dance	Picador

=== Fiction ===
==== International ====
Award	Region	Category	Author	Title	Publisher
Commonwealth Writers' Prize	SE Asia and South Pacific	Best Book	Kim Scott	That Deadman Dance	Picador

==== National ====
Award	Author	Title	Publisher
Adelaide Festival Awards for Literature	Not awarded		
The Age Book of the Year Award	Fiona Kelly McGregor	Indelible Ink	Scribe Publications
The Australian/Vogel Literary Award	Rohan Wilson	The Roving Party	Allen & Unwin
Barbara Jefferis Award	G.L. Osborne	Come Inside	Clouds of Magellan
Colin Roderick Award	Gillian Mears	Foal's Bread	Allen and Unwin
Indie Book Awards Book of the Year – Fiction	Chris Womersley	Bereft	Scribe
Indie Book Awards Book of the Year – Debut Fiction	Jon Bauer	Rocks in the Belly	Scribe
Miles Franklin Award	Kim Scott	That Deadman Dance	Picador
Prime Minister's Literary Awards	Stephen Daisley	Traitor	Text Publishing
New South Wales Premier's Literary Awards	Alex Miller	Lovesong	Allen & Unwin
Queensland Premier's Literary Awards	Amanda Lohrey	Reading Madame Bovary	Black Inc.
Victorian Premier's Literary Award	Kim Scott	That Deadman Dance	Picador
Western Australian Premier's Book Awards	Anna Funder	All That I Am	Penguin Books

=== Children and Young Adult ===
==== National ====
Award	Category	Author	Title	Publisher
Children's Book of the Year Award	Older Readers	Sonya Hartnett	The Midnight Zoo	Viking Books
Children's Book of the Year Award	Younger Readers	Isobelle Carmody	The Red Wind	Viking Books
Children's Book of the Year Award	Picture Book	Jeanie Baker	Mirror	Walker Books
Children's Book of the Year Award	Picture Book	Nicki Greenberg	Hamlet	Allen & Unwin
Children's Book of the Year Award	Early Childhood	Jan Ormerod, illus. Freya Blackwood	Maudie Bear	Little Hare Books
Indie Book Awards Book of the Year	Children's & YA	Jeannie Baker	Mirror	Walker Books
New South Wales Premier's Literary Awards	Children's	Sophie Masson	My Australian Story: The Hunt for Ned Kelly	Scholastic Australia
New South Wales Premier's Literary Awards	Young People's	Cath Crowley	Graffiti Moon	Pan Macmillan Australia
Queensland Premier's Literary Awards	Children's	Michael Gerard Bauer	Just a Dog	Omnibus Books
Queensland Premier's Literary Awards	Young Adult	Barry Jonsberg	Being Here	Allen & Unwin
Victorian Premier's Literary Award	Young Adult Fiction	Cassandra Golds	The Three Loves of Persimmon	Penguin Group
Western Australian Premier's Book Awards	Children's	Michelle Gillespie & Sonia Martinez	Sam, Grace and the Shipwreck	Fremantle Press
Western Australian Premier's Book Awards	Writing for Young Adults	Penni Russon	Only Ever Always	Allen and Unwin

=== Crime and Mystery ===
==== National ====
Award	Category	Author	Title	Publisher
Davitt Award	Novel	Katherine Howell	Cold Justice	Pan Macmillan
Davitt Award	Young Adult novel	Penny Matthews	A Girl Like Me	Penguin
Davitt Award	True crime	Colleen Egan	Murderer No More	Allen & Unwin
Davitt Award	Readers' choice	P. M. Newton	The Old School	Viking
Ned Kelly Award	Novel	Geoffrey McGeachin	The Diggers Rest Hotel	Penguin Books
Ned Kelly Award	First novel	Alan Carter	Prime Cut	Fremantle Press
Ned Kelly Award	True crime	Geesche Jacobsen	Abandoned - The Sad Death of Dianne Brimble	Allen & Unwin
Ned Kelly Award	Lifetime achievement	Not awarded		

=== Science fiction ===
Award	Category	Author	Title	Publisher
Aurealis Award	SF Novel	Kim Westwood	The Courier's New Bicycle	HarperVoyager
Aurealis Award	SF Short Story	Robert N. Stephenson	"Rains of la Strange"	Coeur de Lion Publishing (Anywhere but Earth)
Aurealis Award	Fantasy Novel	Pamela Freeman	Ember and Ash	Hachette
Aurealis Award	Fantasy Short Story	Thoraiya Dyer	"Fruit of the Pipal Tree"	FableCroft Publishing (After the Rain)
Aurealis Award	Horror Short Story	Paul Haines	"The Past is a Bridge Best Left Burnt"	Brimstone Press (The Last Days of Kali Yuga)
Aurealis Award	Horror Short Story	Lisa L. Hannett	"The Short Go: a Future in Eight Seconds"	Ticonderoga Publications (Bluegrass Symphony)
Australian Shadows Awards	Novel	No Award		
Australian Shadows Awards	Long Fiction	Paul Haines	"The Past is a Bridge Best Left Burnt"	Brimstone Press (The Last Days of Kali Yuga)
Australian Shadows Awards	Short Fiction	Amanda J. Spedding	"Shovel Man Joe"	Shades of Sentience, May 2011
Australian Shadows Awards	Edited Publication	Russell B. Farr, editor	Dead Red Heart	Ticonderoga Publications
Australian Shadows Awards	Collected Works	Brett McBean	Tales of Sin and Madness	LegumeMan Books
Ditmar Award	Novel	Tansy Rayner Roberts	Power and Majesty	HarperVoyager
Ditmar Award	Novella/Novelette	Thoraiya Dyer	"The Company Articles of Edward Teach"	Twelfth Planet Press
Ditmar Award	Short Story	Cat Sparks	"All the Love in the World"	Twelfth Planet Press (Sprawl)
Ditmar Award	Short Story	Kirstyn McDermott	"She Said"	Morrigan Books (Scenes From the Second Storey)
Ditmar Award	Collected Work	Alisa Krasnostein ed.	Sprawl	Twelfth Planet Press

=== Poetry ===
Award	Author	Title	Publisher
Adelaide Festival Awards for Literature	Not awarded		
The Age Book of the Year	John Tranter	Starlight: 150 Poems	University of Queensland Press
Anne Elder Award	Rosanna Licari	The Weather of Tongues	Sunline
Grace Leven Prize for Poetry	Not awarded		
Mary Gilmore Prize	Not awarded		
New South Wales Premier's Literary Awards	Jennifer Maiden	Pirate Rain	Giramondo Publishing
Queensland Premier's Literary Awards	John Tranter	Starlight: 150 Poems	University of Queensland Press
Victorian Premier's Literary Award	Cate Kennedy	The Taste of River Water	Scribe
Western Australian Premier's Book Awards	Tracy Ryan	The Argument	Fremantle Press

=== Drama ===
Award	Category	Author	Title	Publisher
New South Wales Premier's Literary Awards	Play	Patricia Cornelius	Do Not Go Gentle	Currency Press
New South Wales Premier's Literary Awards	Script	Debra Oswald	Offspring	Southern Star Entertainment
Patrick White Playwrights' Award	Award	Phillip Kavanagh	Little Borders	
Patrick White Playwrights' Award	Fellowship	Patricia Cornelius		

=== Non-Fiction ===
Award	Category	Author	Title	Publisher
Adelaide Festival Awards for Literature	Non-Fiction	Not awarded		
The Age Book of the Year	Non-fiction	Jim Davidson	A Three-Cornered Life	UNSW Press
Children's Book of the Year Award	Eve Pownall Award for Information Books	Ursula Dubosarsky, illus. Tohby Riddle	The Return of the Word Spy	Viking Books
Davitt Award	True crime	Colleen Egan	Murderer No More	Allen & Unwin
National Biography Award	Biography	Alasdair McGregor	Grand Obsessions: The Life and Work of Walter Burley Griffin and Marion Mahony Griffin	Lantern
Indie Book Awards Book of the Year	Non-Fiction	Anh Do	The Happiest Refugee	Allen & Unwin
Prime Minister's Literary Awards	Non-fiction	Rod Moss	The Hard Light of Day	University of Queensland Press
New South Wales Premier's Literary Awards	Non-fiction	Malcolm Fraser and Margaret Simons	Malcolm Fraser: The Political Memoirs	Melbourne University Publishing
New South Wales Premier's History Awards	Australian History	Penny Russell	Savage or Civilised?: Manners in Colonial Australia	UNSW Press
New South Wales Premier's History Awards	Community and Regional History	Stephen Gapps	Cabrogal to Fairfield City: A History of a Multicultural Community	Fairfield City Council
New South Wales Premier's History Awards	General History	Shane White, Stephen Garton, Stephen Robertson and Graham White	Playing the Numbers: Gambling in Harlem Between the Wars	Harvard University Press
New South Wales Premier's History Awards	Young People's	Kirsty Murray	India Dark	Allen & Unwin
Queensland Premier's Literary Awards	Non-fiction	Mark McKenna	An Eye for Eternity: The Life of Manning Clark	Melbourne University Publishing
Queensland Premier's Literary Awards	History	Alan Powell	Northern Voyagers: Australia's monsoon coast in maritime history	Australian Scholarly Publishing
Victorian Premier's Literary Award	Non-fiction	Mark McKenna	An Eye for Eternity: The Life of Manning Clark	Melbourne University Publishing
Western Australian Premier's Book Awards	Non-fiction	Alice Pung	Her Father's Daughter	Black Inc.
Western Australian Premier's Book Awards	Western Australian history	Fiona Skyring	Justice: A History of the Aboriginal Legal Service of Western Australia	University of Western Australia Press

== Deaths ==
- 1 March – Hazel Rowley, author (born 1951)
- 15 June – Anne Godfrey-Smith, poet and theatre producer/director (born 1921)
- 20 June – T. A. G. Hungerford, author (born 1915)
- 2 September – Bernard Smith, art historian (born 1916)
- 27 September – Sara Douglass, author (born 1957)
- 4 October – Di Gribble, editor and publisher (born 1942)
- 8 December – Zelman Cowen, jurist (born 1919)

Unknown date

- May – Robert J. Merritt, playwright (born 1945)

== See also ==
- 2011 in Australia
- 2011 in literature
- 2011 in poetry
- List of years in Australian literature
- List of years in literature
- List of Australian literary awards
