= Indie Book Awards Book of the Year – Fiction =

Prize category in Australian book awards

The Indie Book Awards Book of the Year – Fiction is a prize category in the annual Indie Book Awards (Australia) presented by Australian Independent Booksellers.

The award was established in 2008.

== Winners and shortlists ==
=== 2008–2009 ===
Indie Book Awards Book of the Year – Fiction
| Year | Author | Title | Result | Ref. |
|---|---|---|---|---|
| 2008 | Tim Winton | Breath | Winner | |
| 2009 | Craig Silvey | Jasper Jones | Winner | |

=== 2010–2019 ===
Indie Book Awards Book of the Year – Fiction
| Year | Author | Title | Result | Ref. |
|---|---|---|---|---|
| 2010 | Not awarded | | | |
| 2011 | Chris Womersley | Bereft | Winner | |
| 2012 | Elliot Perlman | The Street Sweeper | Winner | |
| 2012 | Geraldine Brooks | Caleb's Crossing | Finalist | |
| 2012 | Gillian Mears | Foal's Bread | Finalist | |
| 2012 | Gail Jones | Five Bells | Finalist | |
| 2013 | Toni Jordan | Nine Days | Winner | |
| 2013 | Christopher Koch | Lost Voices | Finalist | |
| 2013 | Michelle de Kretser | Questions of Travel | Finalist | |
| 2013 | Drusilla Modjeska | The Mountain | Finalist | |
| 2014 | Richard Flanagan | The Narrow Road to the Deep North | Winner | |
| 2014 | Christos Tsiolkas | Barracuda | Finalist | |
| 2014 | Alex Miller | Coal Creek | Finalist | |
| 2014 | Tim Winton | Eyrie | Finalist | |
| 2015 | Sonya Hartnett | Golden Boys | Winner | |
| 2015 | Favel Parrett | When the Night Comes | Finalist | |
| 2015 | Peter Carey | Amnesia | Finalist | |
| 2015 | Graeme Simsion | The Rosie Effect | Finalist | |
| 2016 | Charlotte Wood | The Natural Way of Things | Winner | |
| 2016 | Gail Jones | A Guide to Berlin | Finalist | |
| 2016 | Stephanie Bishop | The Other Side of the World | Finalist | |
| 2016 | Geraldine Brooks | The Secret Chord | Finalist | |
| 2017 | Dominic Smith | The Last Painting of Sara de Vos | Winner | |
| 2017 | Hannah Kent | The Good People | Finalist | |
| 2017 | Liane Moriarty | Truly Madly Guilty | Finalist | |
| 2017 | Inga Simpson | Where the Trees Are | Finalist | |
| 2018 | Sofie Laguna | The Choke | Winner | |
| 2018 | Jane Harper | Force of Nature | Finalist | |
| 2018 | Jock Serong | On the Java Ridge | Finalist | |
| 2018 | Chris Womersley | City of Crows | Finalist | |
| 2019 | Markus Zusak | Bridge of Clay | Winner | |
| 2019 | Jane Harper | The Lost Man | Finalist | |
| 2019 | Kristina Olsson | Shell | Finalist | |
| 2019 | Tim Winton | The Shepherd's Hut | Finalist | |

=== 2020– ===
Indie Book Awards Book of the Year – Fiction
| Year | Author | Title | Result | Ref. |
|---|---|---|---|---|
| 2020 | Favel Parrett | There Was Still Love | Winner | |
| 2020 | Heather Rose | Bruny | Finalist | |
| 2020 | Christian White | The Wife and the Widow | Finalist | |
| 2020 | Charlotte Wood | The Weekend | Finalist | |
| 2021 | Craig Silvey | Honeybee | Winner | |
| 2021 | Trent Dalton | All Our Shimmering Skies | Finalist | |
| 2021 | Richard Flanagan | The Living Sea of Waking Dreams | Finalist | |
| 2021 | Chris Flynn | Mammoth | Finalist | |
| 2022 | Charlotte McConaghy | Once There Were Wolves | Winner | |
| 2022 | Chris Hammer | Treasure and Dirt | Finalist | |
| 2022 | Hannah Kent | Devotion | Finalist | |
| 2022 | Inga Simpson | The Last Woman in the World | Finalist | |
| 2023 | Geraldine Brooks | Horse | Winner | |
| 2023 | Robbie Arnott | Limberlost | Finalist | |
| 2023 | Diana Reid | Seeing Other People | Finalist | |
| 2023 | Holly Ringland | The Seven Skins of Esther Wilding | Finalist | |
| 2024 | Melissa Lucashenko | Edenglassie | Winner | |
| 2024 | Trent Dalton | Lola in the Mirror | Finalist | |
| 2024 | Chris Hammer | The Seven | Finalist | |
| 2024 | Pip Williams | The Bookbinder of Jericho | Finalist | |
| 2025 | Robbie Arnott | Dusk | Winner | |
| 2025 | Jock Serong | Cherrywood | Finalist | |
| 2025 | Christian White | The Ledge | Finalist | |
| 2025 | Tim Winton | Juice | Finalist | |
| 2026 | Charlotte McConaghy | Wild Dark Shore | Winner | |
| 2026 | Toni Jordan | Tenderfoot | Finalist | |
| 2026 | Debra Oswald | One Hundred Years of Betty | Finalist | |
| 2026 | Sally Hepworth | Mad Mabel | Finalist | |
