= Indie Book Awards Book of the Year – Debut Fiction =

Prize category in Australian book awards

The Indie Book Awards Book of the Year – Debut Fiction is a prize category in the annual Indie Book Awards (Australia) presented by Australian Independent Booksellers.

The award was established in 2008.

== Winners and shortlists ==
=== 2008–2009 ===
Indie Book Awards Book of the Year – Debut Fiction
Year	Author	Title	Result	Ref.
2008	Toni Jordan	Addition	Winner	
2009	Sonia Orchard	The Virtuoso	Winner	

=== 2010–2019 ===
Indie Book Awards Book of the Year – Debut Fiction
Year	Author	Title	Result	Ref.
2010	Not awarded			
2011	Jon Bauer	Rocks in the Belly	Winner	
2012	Anna Funder	All That I Am	Winner	
2012	Favel Parrett	Past the Shallows	Finalist	
2012	Rohan Wilson	The Roving Party	Finalist	
2012	Adrienne Ferreira	Watercolours	Finalist	
2013	M. L. Stedman	The Light Between Oceans	Winner	
2013	Paul D. Carter	Eleven Seasons	Finalist	
2013	Peter Twohig	The Cartographer	Finalist	
2013	Hannah Richell	Secrets of the Tides	Finalist	
2014	Hannah Kent	Burial Rites	Winner	
2014	Inga Simpson	Mr Wigg	Finalist	
2014	Graeme Simsion	The Rosie Project	Finalist	
2014	Fiona McFarlane	The Night Guest	Finalist	
2015	Maxine Beneba Clarke	Foreign Soil	Winner	
2015	Brooke Davis	Lost & Found	Finalist	
2015	Emily Bitto	The Strays	Finalist	
2015	Christine Piper	After Darkness	Finalist	
2016	Lucy Treloar	Salt Creek	Winner	
2016	Shirley Barrett	Rush Oh!	Finalist	
2016	Robyn Cadwallader	The Anchoress	Finalist	
2016	Antonia Hayes	Relativity	Finalist	
2017	Jane Harper	The Dry	Winner	
2017	Melissa Ashley	The Birdman's Wife	Finalist	
2017	David Dyer	The Midnight Watch	Finalist	
2017	Holly Throsby	Goodwood	Finalist	
2018	Mark Brandi	Wimmera	Winner	
2018	Melanie Cheng	Australia Day	Finalist	
2018	Dennis Glover	The Last Man in Europe	Finalist	
2018	Sarah Schmidt	See What I Have Done	Finalist	
2019	Trent Dalton	Boy Swallows Universe	Winner	
2019	Chris Hammer	Scrublands	Finalist	
2019	Heather Morris	The Tattooist of Auschwitz	Finalist	
2019	Christian White	The Nowhere Child	Finalist	

=== 2020– ===
Indie Book Awards Book of the Year – Debut Fiction
Year	Author	Title	Result	Ref.
2020	Suzanne Daniel	Allegra in Three Parts	Winner	
2020	Anne Brinsden	Wearing Paper Dresses	Finalist	
2020	Felicity McLean	The Van Apfel Girls Are Gone	Finalist	
2020	Molly Murn	Heart of the Grass Tree	Finalist	
2021	Pip Williams	The Dictionary of Lost Words	Winner	
2021	Kyle Perry	The Bluffs	Finalist	
2021	Nardi Simpson	Song of the Crocodile	Finalist	
2021	Jessie Tu	A Lonely Girl is a Dangerous Thing	Finalist	
2022	Lyn Yeowart	The Silent Listener	Winner	
2022	Hannah Bent	When Things Are Alive They Hum	Finalist	
2022	Campbell Mattinson	We Are Not Men	Finalist	
2022	Diana Reid	Love & Virtue	Finalist	
2023	Tracey Lien	All That's Left Unsaid	Winner	
2023	Shelley Burr	Wake	Finalist	
2023	Omar Sakr	Son of Sin	Finalist	
2023	Hayley Scrivener	Dirt Town	Finalist	
2024	Jane Harrison	The Visitors	Winner	
2024	Madeleine Gray	Green Dot	Finalist	
2024	Kerryn Mayne	Lenny Marks Gets Away With Murder	Finalist	
2024	Molly Schmidt	Salt River Road	Finalist	
2025	Lauren Keegan	All the Bees in the Hollows	Winner	
2025	Susannah Begbie	The Deed	Finalist	
2025	Anna Johnston	The Borrowed Life of Frederick Fife	Finalist	
2025	Louise Milligan	Pheasants Nest	Finalist	
2026	Emma Pei Yin	When Sleeping Women Wake	Winner	
2026	Madeleine Cleary	The Butterfly Women	Finalist	
2026	Stefanie Koens	Daughters of Batavia	Finalist	
2026	Angie Faye Martin	Melaleuca	Finalist	
