= The Darkest Hour (Howell novel) =

2008 crime novel by Australian author Katherine Howell

- Author: Katherine Howell
- Language: English
- Series: Ella Marconi
- Genre: Crime novel
- Publisher: Pan Macmillan
- Publication date: 1 July 2008
- Publication place: Australia
- Media type: Print
- Pages: 384 pp.
- Awards: 2009 Davitt Award, Readers Choice, winner
- ISBN: 9781405038324
- Preceded by: Frantic
- Followed by: Cold Justice

The Darkest Hour is a 2008 crime novel by Australian author Katherine Howell.

It is the second novel in the author's Ella Marconi series of crime novels.

It was the winner of the Davitt Award for Best Adult Novel in 2009.

== Synopsis ==
Paramedic Laureen Yates has been threatened by her sister's ex-partner after a stabbing, fearing for her life and her family. But when the same man, Miles Werner, is implicated in another murder she finds Detective Ella Marconi pursuing her.

== Critical reception ==
Reviewing the novel for the AustCrimeFiction website Karen Chisholm was initially worried about this being the author's second book, but found the author had "managed to do it again". She concluded that "Katherine Howell writes a damn good story – her plot is faultless, tension and suspense balanced with small havens of down time for both the characters and reader."

== Publication history ==
After the novel's initial publication in 2008 by Pan Macmillan it was reprinted by Pan Books in the UK in 2014. The novel was also translated into Dutch in 2009 and German in 2010.

== Awards ==
- 2009 Davitt Award for Readers Choice, winner

== Notes ==
- The author was interviewed about the book and he writing career by Doug Parrington for The Gold Coast Bulletin.

== See also ==
- 2008 in Australian literature
