= Streetsweeper (disambiguation) =

A streetsweeper is either a person's occupation or a machine that cleans streets.

Streetsweeper may also refer to:

- Street sweeper (shotgun) a variant of the Armsel Striker, a type of shotgun based on revolver principles
- Streetsweepers Entertainment, label specialized in releasing street mixtapes
- The Streetsweeper, Vol. 1, 2003 album by DJ Kay Slay, or the title track
- The Streetsweeper, Vol. 2, 2004 album by DJ Kay Slay
- "Street Sweeper", a bonus track from Gunna's 2020 album Wunna
- The Street Sweeper, a 2011 novel by Elliot Perlman

== See also ==
- Street Sweeper Social Club, an American rap/rock supergroup
