= Crossing the Lines (Gentill novel) =

Crime novel by Australian writer Sulari Gentill

- Author: Sulari Gentill
- Language: English
- Genre: Fiction
- Publisher: Pantera Press, Australia
- Publication date: 2017
- Publication place: Australia
- Media type: Print
- Pages: 272 pp
- ISBN: 9781921997860
- Preceded by: The Prodigal Son
- Followed by: A Dangerous Language

Crossing the Lines (2017) is a crime novel by Australian writer Sulari Gentill. It was published in the US in 2020 under the title After She Wrote Him.

It won the 2018 Ned Kelly Award for Best Fiction, and was shortlisted for the 2018 Davitt Award for Best Adult Crime Novel.

== Abstract ==
"When Madeleine d’Leon conjures Ned McGinnity as the hero in her latest crime novel, she makes him a serious writer simply because the irony of a protagonist who’d never lower himself to read the story in which he stars, amuses her. When Ned McGinnity creates Madeleine d’Leon, she is his literary device, a writer of detective fiction who is herself a mystery to be unravelled. As Ned and Madeleine play out their own lives while writing the other’s story, they find themselves crossing the lines that divide the real and the imagined. This is a story about two people trying to hold onto each other beyond reality." (Publication summary)

== Critical reception ==
In The Newtown Review of Books Karen Chisholm noted that the novel was "intricate, immersive and elegantly delivered with switching viewpoints that are seamless, and often effected, as in the above quotation, mid-paragraph. There’s nothing jolting about this device, though, the prose is light and captivating and the movement segues so beautifully that you don’t see it, and really don’t care."

The reviewer in Kirkus Reviews concluded: "In this intriguing and unusual tale, a stunning departure from Gentill’s period mysteries (Give the Devil His Due, 2015, etc.), the question is not whodunit but who’s real and who’s a figment of someone’s vivid imagination."

== See also ==
- 2017 in Australian literature
