= Indie Book Awards Book of the Year – Children's & YA =

Australian annual book award

The Indie Book Awards Book of the Year – Children's & YA is a prize category in the annual Indie Book Awards (Australia) presented by Australian Independent Booksellers.

The award was established in 2008. It was split into two separate awards (Indie Book Awards Book of the Year – Children's and Indie Book Awards Book of the Year – Young Adult) in 2016.

== Winners and shortlists ==
Indie Book Awards Book of the Year – Children's & YA
Year	Author	Title	Result	Ref.
2008	Shaun Tan	Tales From Outer Suburbia	Winner	
2009	Sally Murphy & Heather Potter (Illus)	Pearl Verses The World	Winner	
2010	Not awarded			
2011	Jeannie Baker	Mirror	Winner	
2012	Anh Do & Suzanne Do & Bruce Whatley (Illus)	The Little Refugee	Winner	
2012	Graeme Base	The Jewel Fish of Karnak	Finalist	
2012	Andrew McGahan	The Coming of the Whirlpool	Finalist	
2012	Andy Giffiths & Terry Denton (illus)	The 13-Storey Treehouse	Finalist	
2013	Margo Lanagan	Sea Hearts	Winner	
2013	Maureen McCarthy	The Convent	Finalist	
2013	Andy Griffiths & Terry Denton (illus)	The 26-Storey Treehouse	Finalist	
2013	Tohby Riddle	Unforgotten	Finalist	
2014	Alison Lester	Kissed by the Moon	Winner	
2014	Hilary Bell & Antonia Presenti	Alphabetical Sydney	Finalist	
2014	Andy Griffiths & Terry Denton (illus)	The 39-Storey Treehouse	Finalist	
2014	Anh Do	Weirdo	Finalist	
2015	Judith Rossell	Withering-by-Sea	Winner	
2015	Andy Griffiths & Terry Denton (illus)	The 52-Storey Treehouse	Finalist	
2015	Aaron Blabey	Pig the Pug	Finalist	
2015	Alice Pung	Laurinda	Finalist	
