= Rupetta =

2013 novel by Nike A. Sulway

- Author: Nike Sulway
- Language: English
- Genre: Science fiction
- Publisher: Tartarus Press
- Publication date: 2013
- Publication place: Australia
- Media type: Print
- Pages: 352
- ISBN: 9781905784509

Rupetta (2013) is a science fiction novel by Australian writer Nike Sulway, who has previously published work under the pseudonym Nicole Bourke. The novel won the 2013 James Tiptree, Jr. Award.

== Plot summary ==
The novel follows the story of Rupetta, a mechanical woman built in rural France in 1619 and endowed with sentience and immortality. In order for Rupetta to function properly, she must be "wound" like a clock. The responsibility for this "wynding" falls on the female descendants of Rupetta's creator Eloise. The novel explores the interactions over the generations between Rupetta and her "wynders".

== Reviews ==
George Williams in The Australian found: "The book is notable not just for its original story but its form. It is written in an unusual, lilting style that somehow manages to capture the emotional resonance of the scene, whether it be happy, melancholy, earnest or reflective. The style brings to mind a children's fairytale...Rupetta is a rich, complex work wrapped in an engaging style. It is not a book that can be pigeonholed. It has elements of fantasy, romance and even gothic horror in the mould of Mary Shelley's Frankenstein. At the same time, it contains lengthy discussions on questions such as the meaning of knowledge."

The James Tiptree, Jr. Award jury noted that the novel was: "A deft blend of fantasy, science fiction, romance, and even gothic horror, this beautifully written story challenges the reader’s expectations about gender and of a gendering society. It examines power and what makes an object of power, relationships and love, sexuality and identity, and how culture is shaped and history is made."

== Awards and nominations ==
- 2013 shortlisted Aurealis Award for best science fiction novel
- 2013 winner International Awards – James Tiptree, Jr. Award First Australian work to win the James Tiptree, Jr Award.
- 2014 winner Norma K. Hemming Award
- 2014 runner-up (shortlisted) IAFA William L. Crawford Fantasy Award

== See also ==
- 2013 in Australian literature
