= The Butterfly Man (novel) =

2005 crime novel by Australian author Heather Rose

- Author: Heather Rose
- Language: English
- Genre: Crime novel
- Publisher: University of Queensland Press
- Publication date: 1 January 2005
- Publication place: Australia
- Media type: Print
- Pages: 317 pp.
- Awards: 2006 Davitt Award, Best Adult Novel, winner
- ISBN: 0702235350

The Butterfly Man is a 2005 crime novel by Australian author Heather Rose.

It was the winner of the Davitt Award for Best Adult Novel in 2006.

== Synopsis ==
On 7 November 1974 Sandra Rivett, nanny to the children of Lord Lucan and his wife, was murdered in the couple's home; Lucan subsequently disappeared and was declared dead in 1999. This novel proposes that Lucan fled Britain and settled in Tasmania where he took the name of Henry Kennedy. Now, in 1995 in his late 50s, Kennedy has been diagnosed with deadly brain tumours and is starting to make mistakes and let slip details of his past life.

== Critical reception ==
In The Courier-Mail Mary Philip noted: "By linking the seasons in the Tasmanian landscape with Henry's stages of dying and his evolving relationships with those around him, Rose builds a quietly powerful story. As with all good creative fiction, The Butterfly Man fills out the characters of the Lucan drama in a way reams of newspaper and magazine articles about this mystery don't."

Liam Davison in The Weekend Australian commented: "Risky as the novel's premise is, Rose uses it as an effective platform to launch an enthralling investigation into the nature of truth and the lies and deceptions with which we live. While there are moments where the reader may question the plausibility of Bingham's [Lucan's] transformation, the real measure of Rose's success is that we can sympathise and empathise with this warm and humane man's plight, despite knowing about his former life."

== Awards ==
- 2006 Davitt Award for Best Adult Novel, winner

== Notes ==
- Dedication: For Rowan
- Epigraph: A single event can awaken within us a stranger totally unknown to us. (Antoine de Saint-Exupery)
- Daphne Guinness interviewed the author about the novel for The Sydney Morning Herald

== Publication history ==
After the novel's initial publication by University of Queensland Press in 2005 it was reprinted by the same publisher in 2007.

== See also ==
- 2005 in Australian literature
