= Once There Were Wolves =

2021 novel by Australian author Charlotte McConaghy

- Author: Charlotte McConaghy
- Language: English
- Genre: Literary novel
- Publisher: Hamish Hamilton
- Publication date: 3 August 2021
- Publication place: Australia
- Media type: Print
- Pages: 258 pp.
- Awards: 2022 Indie Book Awards Book of the Year – Fiction, winner; 2022 Davitt Award – Best Adult Novel, winner
- ISBN: 9781761043222

Once There Were Wolves is a 2021 novel by the Australian author Charlotte McConaghy.

It was the winner of the 2022 Indie Book Awards Book of the Year – Fiction.

== Synopsis ==
Inti is the head of Cairngorms National Park's Wolf Project in Scotland. The project aims to release 14 wolves into the park as a part of their rewilding project. The project is met with opposition from local farmers who worry about their sheep flocks. Then a dead body is discovered and Inti begins to suspect a local policeman of the murder.

== Critical reception ==
Writing in The Newtown Review of Books Ann Skea was impressed with the novel: "Charlotte McConaghy draws the reader into the lives of her characters, and realistically coveys the closeness, secrets, fears and mutual support of a small community where people have grown up together and know each other well...Ecology, climate change and self-sufficiency are casually woven in as underlying themes, but it is the creatures – human and wolf – that are the heart of the story."

== See also ==
- 2021 in Australian literature

== Notes ==
- Dedication: "For my little one"
- Epigraph: "One beast and only one howls in the woods by night." - Angela Carter

== Publication history ==
After the novel's initial publication by Hamish Hamilton it was reprinted as follows:

- 2021 Flatiron Books, USA
- 2022 Chatto and Windus, UK

The novel was also translated into Swedish, German, Finnish, Dutch and Danish in 2022, Greek in 2023, and French in 2024.

== Awards ==
- 2022 Indie Book Awards Book of the Year – Fiction, winner
- 2022 Davitt Award – Best Adult Novel, winner
