= Christopher Brennan Award =

Australian award for lifetime achievement in poetry

- Description: Lifetime achievement in Australian poetry
- Country: Australia
- Presented by: Fellowship of Australian Writers
- Formerly called: Robert Frost Medallion/Robert Frost Prize
- Reward: Bronze plaque
- First award: 1973
- Final award: 2015

The Christopher Brennan Award (formerly known as the Robert Frost Prize after American writer Robert Frost) is an Australian award given for lifetime achievement in poetry. The award, established in 1973, takes the form of a bronze plaque which is presented to a poet who produces work of "sustained quality and distinction". It was awarded by the Fellowship of Australian Writers and named after the poet Christopher Brennan. The most recent award was made in 2015.

== Recipients ==
Year	Recipient	Reference
1974	R. D. Fitzgerald	
1975	Judith Wright	
1976	A. D. Hope	
1977	Gwen Harwood	
1978	Rosemary Dobson	
1979	Not awarded	
1980	John Blight	
1981	Not awarded	
1982	Vincent Buckley	
1983	Bruce Dawe	
1984	Not awarded	
1985	Les Murray	
1986	Not awarded	
1987	Not awarded	
1988	Roland Robinson	
1989	Chris Wallace-Crabbe	
1990	Not awarded	
1991	Elizabeth Riddell	
1992	Oodgeroo Noonuccal	
1992	R. A. Simpson	
1993	Geoffrey Dutton	
1994	Judith Rodriguez	
1995	Robert Adamson	
1995	Thomas Shapcott	
1996	Dorothy Hewett	
1997	Not awarded	
1998	Jennifer Maiden	
1999	Kevin Hart	
2000	J. S. Harry	
2001	Dorothy Porter	
2002	Dimitris Tsaloumas	
2003	Philip Salom	
2004	Kris Hemensley	
2005	Fay Zwicky	
2006	Geoff Page	
2007	John Kinsella	
2009	Jennifer Strauss	
2010	Peter Steele	
2011	Jennifer Harrison	
2012	Tim Thorne	
2013	Judith Beveridge	
2014	Alan Wearne	
2015	Gig Ryan	

The award has been given posthumously to Francis Webb, James McAuley and David Campbell.

== See also ==
- List of Australian literary awards
- Australian poetry

== See also ==
- Wilde, W., Hooton, J. & Andrews, B (1994) The Oxford Companion of Australian Literature 2nd ed. South Melbourne, Oxford University Press
- National Awards - current information on Christopher Brennan Award posted by FAW's Victorian branch.
