= Helene Young =

Australian author

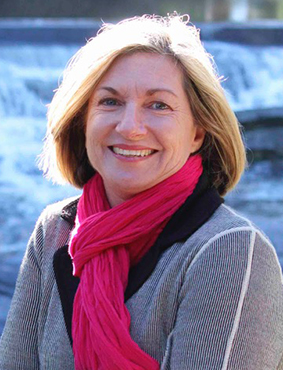
- Occupation: Novelist
- Writing career
- Language: English
- Genre: Romantic suspense
- Subject: Australian Fiction
- Website: www.heleneyoung.com

Helene Young is an Australian author of seven romantic suspense novels.

== Career ==
Young’s debut novel Wings of Fear (formerly known as Border Watch) was published in 2010 and won the Australian Romance Readers Association (ARRA) Favourite Romantic Suspense award in 2010 and the Romance Writers of Australia (RWA) Romantic Book of the Year in 2011. It is the first book in a trilogy focusing on coastal surveillance around Australia.

The second book in the series, Shattered Sky, won the RWA Romantic Book of the Year award in 2012 and was shortlisted for the Davitt Award, also in 2012.

The final book in the series, Burning Lies, was shortlisted for Daphne du Maurier Award Mystery/Suspense in 2013 and the 2013 RWA Romantic Book of the Year.

Young was voted the Australian Romance Readers Association’s favourite romantic suspense writer in 2010, 2011, 2013, 2014 and 2015.

She says her inspiration comes from her colleagues in the aviation industry, her personal experiences, living in regional Australia and meeting people and strong women characters.

== Personal ==
In 2017, ill health cut Young's 28-year career in the aviation industry, which included being a pilot, Grade One Flight Instructor, Check and Training Captain for QantasLink and Queensland Regional Flying Manager for QantasLink. She and her husband Graham now sail the Coral Sea on their catamaran while she continues to write. She also conducts writing courses for the Queensland Writers Centre and speaks at book clubs, writing and community groups, schools and libraries.

== Bibliography ==
- Wings of Fear (Formerly Border Watch) – 2010 Hachette Australia
- Shattered Sky – February 2011 – Hachette Australia
- Burning Lies – 2012 – Penguin Australia
- Half Moon Bay, 22 May 2013 – Penguin Australia
- Safe Harbour, 26 March 2014 – Penguin Australia
- Northern Heat, 27 May 2015 – Penguin Australia
- Return to Roseglen, 2 July 2018 - Penguin Random House Australia
