= Undertow (novel) =

2006 crime novel by Australian author Sydney Bauer

- Title page for Undertow
- Author: Sydney Bauer
- Language: English
- Series: David Cavanagh
- Genre: Crime novel
- Publisher: Pan Macmillan
- Publication date: 1 January 2005
- Publication place: Australia
- Media type: Print
- Pages: 425 pp.
- Awards: 2007 Davitt Award, Best Adult Novel, winner
- ISBN: 1405037113
- Preceded by: -
- Followed by: Gospel

Undertow is a 2006 crime novel by Australian author Sydney Bauer.

It is the first novel in the author's David Cavanagh series of crime novels.

It was the winner of the Davitt Award for Best Adult Novel in 2007.

== Synopsis ==
A birthday boating trip taken at Cape Ann in Massachusetts turns into a disaster when a young woman, Christina Hayes, dies after being thrown from the boat. The last person she spoke to was lawyer Rayna Martin who left the girl, after being told she was all right, to attend to the other people who had gone overboard. Hayes's father, a US senator, is unconvinced by Martin's story and pressures the Boston legal system to have her charged with murder. Martin is defended in court by David Cavanagh.

== Critical reception ==
A review in The Canberra Times noted that "The opening sections are a little slow, but once the trial begins the pace picks up considerably and Bauer proves herself to be adept at writing exciting courtroom scenes that zip along and take the reader with them."

In The Age Cameron Woodhead describes the book as "Sydney Bauer has done a Grisham, producing a fast-paced and suspenseful legal thriller."

== Awards ==
- 2007 Davitt Award for Best Adult Novel, winner
- 2007 Australian Book Industry Awards (ABIA) — Australian Newcomer of the Year, shortlisted

== Notes ==
- Dedication: To Jarrod, for everything.
- "Sydney Bauer" is the pen-name of Kimberly Scott, an Australian TV executive and publicity director.

== See also ==
- 2006 in Australian literature
