= Eye to Eye (Shaw novel) =

2000 crime novel by Australian author Caroline Shaw

- Author: Caroline Shaw
- Language: English
- Genre: Crime novel
- Publisher: Random House
- Publication date: 2000
- Publication place: Australia
- Media type: Print
- Pages: 314 pp.
- Awards: 2001 Davitt Award, Best Adult Novel, winner
- ISBN: 1863252576
- Preceded by: Cat Catcher
- Followed by: -

Eye to Eye is a 2000 crime novel by the Australian author Caroline Shaw.

It is the second novel in the author's "Lenny Aaron" series following Cat Catcher which was published in 1999.

It was the winner of the inaugural Davitt Award for Best Adult Novel in 2001.

== Synopsis ==
Lenny Aaron is a "cat catcher", who undertakes some private investigations on the side. Here she is employed by an insurance firm to go undercover as a student at Aquinas School of Film in inner-north Melbourne. The school has been experiencing a number of series of thefts of expensive equipment. Then a body is found, murdered in a rather gruesome manner. And then another, and Aaron is dragged into that investigation as well.

== Critical reception ==
In The Age Stuart Coupe was particularly intrigued by the author's sense of place: "Eye to Eye is Chandleresque-droll, well paced and, occasionally, side-splittingly funny. I read it not too much for the plot, superbly maintained as it is, but for the sense of presence, the observations, the insights and the characterisations."

Sue Turnbull, writing in Australian Book Review noted: "The Lenny character and the novels are sustained by the unresolved contradictions she increasingly articulates about herself: can her rejection of other people and her Swiftian repugnance at human uncleanliness continue to overcome her desire for contact and for love, whatever that might mean?"

== See also ==
- 2000 in Australian literature
