= Green Dot (novel) =

2023 novel by Madeleine Gray

- Author: Madeleine Gray
- Language: English
- Genre: Literary fiction
- Publisher: Allen & Unwin
- Publication date: 3 October 2023
- Publication place: Australia
- Media type: Print
- Pages: 384 pp.
- ISBN: 9781761068614

Green Dot is Australian author Madeleine Gray's debut novel, published in 2023. It won the Matt Richell Award for New Writer at the ABIA Awards in 2024, and was shortlisted for several other awards.

== Book ==
Green Dot was published by Allen & Unwin in 2023, becoming very popular as well as attracting critical acclaim.

The protagonist of the novel is a queer, intelligent, educated 24-year-old woman, Hera Stephen, who begins to fall into madness after beginning a relationship with an older, married colleague. Green Dot has been labelled as "sad girl fiction".

== Author ==
Madeleine Gray is an Australian novelist, who has worked at a bookstore.

She graduated from the University of Sydney and University of Oxford, and as of 2024 was undertaking a PhD in literary theory at the University of Manchester in Manchester, England.

== Awards ==
Year	Award	Category	Result	Ref.
2024	Australian Book Industry Awards (ABIA)	The Matt Richell Award for New Writer	Won	
2024	Australian Book Industry Awards (ABIA)	Australian General Fiction Book of the Year	Shortlisted	
2024	APA Book Design Awards	Designed Commercial Fiction Cover (designed by Alissa Dinallo)	Longlisted	
2024	Booksellers Choice Award Book People Book of the Year	Adult Fiction Book of the Year	Shortlisted	
2024	British Book Awards	Debut	Shortlisted	
2024	Indie Book Awards	Debut Fiction	Shortlisted	
2025	Russell Prize for Humour Writing	— wonstyle="background: #FE9; color:black; vertical-align: middle; text-align: center; " class="table-no2"|Shortlisted		

== See also ==
- 2023 in Australian literature
