= Forbidden Fruit (novel) =

2009 crime novel by Australian author Kerry Greenwood

- Author: Kerry Greenwood
- Language: English
- Series: Corinna Chapman
- Genre: Crime novel
- Publisher: Allen & Unwin
- Publication date: October 2009
- Publication place: Australia
- Media type: Print
- Pages: 301
- Awards: 2010 Davitt Award, Readers Choice, winner
- ISBN: 9781741759822
- Preceded by: Trick or Treat
- Followed by: Cooking the Books

Forbidden Fruit is a 2009 crime novel by Australian author Kerry Greenwood.

It is the fifth novel in the author's Corinna Chapman series of crime novels.

It was the winner of the Readers Choice Davitt Award in 2010.

== Synopsis ==
Corinna Chapman's lover Daniel, the Israeli ex-soldier and now private investigator, is attempting to track down two teenage runaways. He is doing so because he's been engaged by the pregnant girl's parents, and Corinna joins in because she is worried about the girl.

== Critical reception ==
Reviewing the novel for The Age newspaper Jeff Glorfeld concluded: "Greenwood shows us that monsters don't need to pack automatic weapons to wreak fearful damage, and that all too often the most abject victims are the weak, the dispossessed, and the innocent children. If all that sounds frightfully heavy, fear not: Greenwood knows a proper feast includes the savoury and the sweet. Hers is a unique voice in crime fiction."

Karen Chisholm, writing for the AustCrimeFiction website, was not as impressed: "There are some glimpses of parallels between elements of these books and the Phyrne Fisher series that were interesting - a similar sort of independent, feisty female character with an abandonment of normal conventions. But in FORBIDDEN FRUIT everything just seemed a little too over the top, a little too arch, a little too preachy for comfort."

== Publication history ==
After the novel's initial publication in Australia by Allen & Unwin in 2006 it was reprinted by Poison Pen Press in the US in 2010.

== Awards ==
- 2010 Davitt Award Readers Choice, winner

== See also ==
- 2009 in Australian literature

== Notes ==
- Epigraph: For unto us a Child is born, Unto us a Son is given. - GF Handel, Messiah.
