= Tamam Shud: The Somerton Man Mystery =

2012 non-fiction book by Australian author Kerry Greenwood

- Author: Kerry Greenwood
- Language: English
- Genre: Non-fiction
- Publisher: NewSouth Publishing
- Publication date: 1 December 2012
- Publication place: Australia
- Media type: Print
- Pages: 221
- Awards: 2013 Davitt Award, Readers Choice, winner
- ISBN: 9781741759822

Tamam Shud: The Somerton Man Mystery is a 2012 non-fiction book by Australian author Kerry Greenwood.

It was the winner of the Readers Choice Davitt Award in 2013.

== Synopsis ==
The author investigates the case of the "Somerton Man", an unidentified man whose body was found on 1 December 1948 on the beach at Somerton, a suburb of Adelaide, South Australia.

The book also contains a Phryne Fisher story about the mystery.

== Critical reception ==
In The Advertiser newspaper Katherine England commented: "This is a very Greenwood book; gossipy, personal, sometimes a little silly and endlessly but purposefully discursive, always coming round to some aspect of the crime or theory about its solution. The last word on the case, and a second imaginative elucidation, is given to the fabulous Phryne Fisher - a Phryne aged by her Resistance work during the war, her black hair slightly silvered in her late 40s, her memories haunted, but her instinct and feminist ethics still safely intact."

Reviewing the book for the Sydney Review of Books Jennifer Mills saw it as a missed opportunity: "Someone in love with their form can see infinite potential within it, and Greenwood’s storytelling is impeccable, engaging, great fun. But someone in love with their form can also miss the potential that lies in breaking away from it, shifting familiar parameters to suit the demands of a different kind of story. Greenwood’s curiosity is so infectious, her stories so interesting, and the mystery of Somerton Man so fascinating, that this flaw can easily slip past us."

== Awards ==
- 2013 Davitt Award Readers Choice, winner

== See also ==
- 2012 in Australian literature
