= A Decline in Prophets =

2011 crime novel by Sulari Gentill

- Author: Sulari Gentill
- Language: English
- Series: Rowland Sinclair
- Genre: Crime novel
- Publisher: Pantera Press
- Publication date: 1 July 2011
- Publication place: Australia
- Media type: Print
- Pages: 353
- Awards: 2012 Davitt Award, Best Adult Novel, winner
- ISBN: 9780980741896
- Preceded by: A Few Right Thinking Men
- Followed by: Miles Off Course

A Decline in Prophets is a 2011 crime novel by Australian author Sulari Gentill. It was originally published in Australia by Arena.

It is the second installment in the author's Rowland Sinclair series of novels, following A Few Right Thinking Men (2010).

The novel was the winner of the Davitt Award for Best Adult Novel in 2012.

== Synopsis ==
Rowland Sinclair is travelling on a luxury liner, along with a large number of religious figures; clergymen and members of the Theosophical Society. One of these "prophets" is found stabbed to death by Sinclair's walking stick and he, of course, is implicated.

== Critical reception ==
Writing in The Age newspaper Cameron Woodhead noted, "There's an Evelyn-Waugh-meets-Agatha-Christie feel about this series, though it perhaps bears closer comparison to that celebrated contemporary author of period crime, the Russian Boris Akunin."

Kirkus Reviews called this novel "A delightful period piece."

== Publication history ==
After the novel's initial publication by Pantera Press in Australia in 2011 the novel was reprinted as follows:

- 2016 Poisoned Pen, USA
- 2017 Pantera Press, Australia
- 2020 Oldcastle Books, UK

== Awards ==
- 2012 Davitt Award — Best Adult Crime Novel, winner

== Notes ==
- Dedication: To all the prophets and profiteers I have known.

== See also ==
- 2011 in Australian literature
