= Nine Days (novel) =

2012 novel by Australian author Toni Jordan

- Author: Toni Jordan
- Language: English
- Genre: Literary novel
- Publisher: Text Publishing
- Publication date: 2012
- Publication place: Australia
- Media type: Print
- Pages: 247 pp.
- Awards: 2013 Indie Book Awards Book of the Year – Fiction, winner
- ISBN: 1921922834

Nine Days is a 2012 novel by the Australian author Toni Jordan.

It was the winner of the 2013 Indie Book Awards Book of the Year – Fiction.

== Synopsis ==
The novel tells the stories of the Westaways, a working-class Richmond family, across several generations. It follows nine characters, each of whose story is told in a separate chapter, with each dealing with one day in the life of its principal character.

== Critical reception ==
Reviewing the book for Australian Book Review Donata Carrazza noted that in spite of the novel's serious themes "this is an easy book to read, with many observations about families and their foibles, comic scenarios involving objects and underwear, sharp repartee between mothers and sons, twin siblings, and neighbourhood louts...Jordan is clear that what binds us to one another and to a meaningful life is simply valuing the life you have been given and the family that is yours and yours alone."

Emma Perry, for ArtsHub was clearly impressed with the work: "The structure of Nine Days allows for creative overlapping of each narrative. It cleverly demands involvement from the reader to piece together the story and the fate of the characters as it unfolds...This is an ambitious novel; skillfully crafted and intelligent. Jordan's trademark wit and ability to manipulate the narrative is a triumph."

== Awards ==
- 2013 Indie Book Awards Book of the Year – Fiction, winner

== Publication history ==
After the novel's initial publication in 2012 in Australia by Text Publishing, it was reprinted as follows:

- Sceptre, UK, 2013
- Text Publishing, Australia, 2013

It was also translated into German in 2012, and Hebrew and Dutch in 2013.

== Notes ==
- Dedication: For Robbie, for everything, of course.
- Author's note: This novel was inspired by a photograph from the State Library of Victoria's Argus newspaper collection of war photographs. The couple in the photograph are unidentified. Connie Westaway and Jack Husting are entirely fictitious and their fates are not those of the photograph's subjects.

== See also ==
- 2012 in Australian literature
