= Frantic (novel) =

2007 crime novel by Australian author Katherine Howell

- Author: Katherine Howell
- Language: English
- Genre: Crime novel
- Publisher: Pan Macmillan
- Publication date: 1 May 2007
- Publication place: Australia
- Media type: Print
- Pages: 282 pp.
- Awards: 2008 Davitt Award, Best Adult Novel, winner
- ISBN: 9781405037976
- Preceded by: -
- Followed by: The Darkest Hour

Frantic is a 2007 crime novel by Australian author Katherine Howell.

It is the first novel in the author's Ella Marconi series of crime novels.

It was the winner of the Davitt Award for Best Adult Novel in 2008.

== Synopsis ==
Sophie Phillips, a Sydney-based paramedic, has had her policeman husband shot and her child abducted. Her case is taken up by Detective Ella Marconi. It appears that Sophie's family has become the victim of police corruption that seems to cover the whole of the police department, right to the top.

== Critical reception ==
Discussing recent Australian crime fiction in The Canberra Times reviewer Jeff Popple called this novel "a busy page-turner full of action and dramatic incidents. The pacing is brisk and the plotting is not too subtle".

In The Courier-Mail Reg Anderson found the novel to be "a ripper of a yarn, told with verve and feeling for the characters and place."

== Publication history ==
After the novel's initial publication in 2007 by Pan Macmillan it was reprinted by the same publisher in 2008 and in 2011.

The novel was also translated into German in 2008 and French in 2009.

== Awards ==
- 2008 Davitt Award for Best Adult Novel, winner

== Notes ==
- Dedication: For Phil H. and Phil G.

== See also ==
- 2007 in Australian literature
