= Mad Men, Bad Girls and the Guerilla Knitters Institute =

2012 crime novel by Maggie Groff

- Author: Maggie Groff
- Language: English
- Series: Scout Davis Investigation
- Genre: Crime novel
- Publisher: PanMacmillan Australia
- Publication date: 1 March 2012
- Publication place: Australia
- Media type: Print
- Pages: 359
- Awards: 2013 Davitt Award, Best Adult Novel, winner
- ISBN: 9781742610795
- Preceded by: -
- Followed by: Good News, Bad News

Mad Men, Bad Girls and the Guerilla Knitters Institute is a 2012 debut crime novel by Australian author Maggie Groff. It was originally published in Australia by PanMacmillan.

It is the first installment in the author's Scout Davis Investigation series of novels, preceding Good News, Bad News (2013).

The novel was the winner of the Davitt Award for Best Adult Novel in 2013.

== Synopsis ==
Scout Davis is a middle-aged freelance writer living in Byron Bay, New South Wales. Her husband is a war correspondent working for Reuters in Afghanistan, her daughter has recently moved to Sydney, and she is a member of the Guerilla Knitters Institute, a group who produce knitted artworks. An American cult has moved into the area and Scout is commissioned by a newspaper to write an article about them. While doing so she encounters a woman who has lost a daughter to the cult and the two set out to expose the cult's leader.

== Critical reception ==
Sue Turnbull, in The Sydney Morning Herald, described the novel as being "all a bit chick-litty, Janet Evanovichy and perilously close to cute - but fun, especially the knitting."

Reviewing the novel for The Age, Thuy On saw similar connections: "Though Maggie Groff deals with some fairly heavy material such as brainwashing cults and adolescent bullying, there's a humorous strain that carries the narrative to its outlandish climax. Scout is a likeable protagonist, feisty and intrepid: think Janet Evanovich's Stephanie Plum but with an Australian drawl."

== Publication history ==
After the novel's initial publication by PanMacmillan in Australia in 2012 the novel was reprinted by the same publisher in 2013. The novel was also translated into German in 2014.

== Awards ==
- 2013 Davitt Award — Best Adult Crime Novel, winner
- 2013 Davitt Award — Best Debut Crime Novel, winner

== Notes ==
- Dedication: For Hannah Kay Follow your dreams, darling girl.
- Fran Metcalf, of The Courier-Mail newspaper, spoke to the author about the writing of the book.

== See also ==
- 2012 in Australian literature
