= Davitt Award =

Australian literary award

Davitt Awards
- Awarded for: Excellence in Australian crime fiction, adult and young adult
- Country: Australia
- Presented by: Sisters in Crime, Australia
- First award: 2001
- Website: www.sistersincrime.org.au/node/2

The Davitt Awards are literary awards which are presented annually by the Sisters in Crime, Australia association. The awards are named in honour of Ellen Davitt (1812–1879) who wrote Australia's first mystery novel, Force and Fraud in 1865. They are presented for Australian crime fiction, by women, for both adults and young adults. They were established in 2001 to mark the 10th anniversary of the association.

== Categories ==
- Adult Novel
- Young Adult Novel
- True Crime
- Debut Crime
- Readers' Choice

== Previous winners ==
=== 2000s ===
Davitt Award winners 2000-2009
Year	Category	Author	Title	Ref
2001	Adult Novel	Caroline Shaw	Eye to Eye	
2002	Adult Novel	Carolyn Morwood	A Simple Death	
2002	Young Adult Novel	Kerry Greenwood	The Three-Pronged Dagger	
2002	Readers' Choice	Lindy Cameron	Bleeding Hearts	
2003	Adult Novel	Gabrielle Lord	Baby Did a Bad Bad Thing	
2003	Adult Novel	Alex Palmer	Blood Redemption	
2003	Young Adult Novel	Natalie Jane Prior	Fireworks and Darkness	
2003	Readers' Choice	Cathy Cole	Skin Deep	
2004	Adult Novel	Janette Turner Hospital	Due Preparations for the Plague	
2004	Young Adult Novel	Ruth Starke	Muck-Up Day	
2004	Readers' Choice	Lindy Cameron	Thicker Than Water	
2005	Adult Novel	Kathryn Fox	Malicious Intent	
2005	Young Adult Novel	Joanna Baker	Devastation Road	
2005	Readers' Choice	Leigh Redhead	Peepshow	
2006	Adult Novel	Heather Rose	The Butterfly Man	
2006	Young Adult Novel	Catherine Jinks	Evil Genius	
2006	Readers' Choice	Kerry Greenwood	Heavenly Pleasures	
2006	Readers' Choice	Leigh Redhead	Rubdown	
2007	Adult Novel	Sydney Bauer	Undertow	
2007	Young Adult Novel	Jaclyn Moriarty	The Betrayal of Bindy Mackenzie	
2007	True Crime	Karen Kissane	Silent Death: The Killing of Julie Ramage	
2007	Readers' Choice	Kerry Greenwood	Devil's Food	
2007	Readers' Choice	Karen Kissane	Silent Death: The Killing of Julie Ramage	
2008	Adult Novel	Katherine Howell	Frantic	
2008	Young Adult Novel	Mandy Sayer	The Night Has a Thousand Eyes	
2008	True Crime	Janet Fife-Yeomans	Killing Jodie	
2008	Readers' Choice	Lindy Cameron	Scarlet Stiletto: The First Cut	
2009	Adult Novel	Malla Nunn	A Beautiful Place to Die	
2009	Young Adult Novel	Catherine Jinks	Genius Squad	
2009	True Crime	Chloe Hooper	The Tall Man: Death and Life on Palm Island	
2009	Readers' Choice	Katherine Howell	The Darkest Hour	

=== 2010s ===
Davitt Award winners 2010-2019
Year	Category	Author	Title	Ref
2010	Adult Novel	Marianne Delacourt	Sharp Shooter	
2010	Young Adult Novel	Justine Larbalestier	Liar	
2010	True Crime	Ellen Connolly and Candace Sutton	Ladykiller	
2010	Readers' Choice	Kerry Greenwood	Forbidden Fruit	
2011	Adult Novel	Katherine Howell	Cold Justice	
2011	Young Adult Novel	Penny Matthews	A Girl Like Me	
2011	True Crime	Colleen Egan	Murderer No More	
2011	Readers' Choice	P. M. Newton	The Old School	
2012	Adult Novel	Sulari Gentill	A Decline in Prophets	
2012	Young Adult Novel	Meg McKinlay	Surface Tension	
2012	True Crime	Liz Porter	Cold Case Files: Past Crimes Solved by New Forensic Science	
2012	Debut Novel	Jaye Ford	Beyond Fear	
2012	Readers' Choice	Y. A. Erskine	The Brotherhood	
2012	Readers' Choice	Jaye Ford	Beyond Fear	
2013	Adult Novel	Maggie Groff	Mad Men, Bad Girls and the Guerilla Knitters Institute	
2013	Young Adult Novel	Jennifer Walsh	The Tunnels of Tarcoola	
2013	True Crime	Pamela Burton	The Waterlow Killings	
2013	Debut Novel	Maggie Groff	Mad Men, Bad Girls and the Guerilla Knitters Institute	
2013	Readers' Choice	Kerry Greenwood	Tamam Shud: The Somerton Man Mystery	
2014	Adult Novel	Honey Brown	Dark Horse	
2014	Young Adult Novel	Karen Foxlee	The Midnight Dress	
2014	Children's Novel	Jen Storer	Spooked!	
2014	True Crime	Anna Krien	Night Games: Sex, Power and Sport	
2014	Debut Novel	Hannah Kent	Burial Rites	
2014	Readers' Choice	Hannah Kent	Burial Rites	
2015	Adult Novel	Liane Moriarty	Big Little Lies	
2015	Young Adult Novel	Ellie Marney	Every Word	
2015	Children's Novel	Judith Rossell	Withering-By-Sea	
2015	True Crime	Caroline Overington	Last Woman Hanged	
2015	Debut Novel	Christine Bongers	Intruder	
2015	Readers' Choice	Sandi Wallace	Tell Me Why	
2016	Adult Novel	Emma Viskic	Resurrection Bay	
2016	Young Adult Novel	Fleur Ferris	Risk	
2016	Children's Novel	R. A. Spratt	Friday Barnes, Under Suspicion	
2016	True Crime	Alecia Simmonds	Wild Man	
2016	Debut Novel	Emma Viskic	Resurrection Bay	
2016	Debut Novel	Fleur Ferris	Risk	
2016	Readers' Choice	Emma Viskic	Resurrection Bay	
2017	Adult Novel	Jane Harper	The Dry	
2017	Young Adult Novel	Shivaun Plozza	Frankie	
2017	Children's Novel	Judith Rossell	Wormwood Mire: A Stella Montgomery Intrigue	
2017	True Crime	Megan Norris	Look What You Made Me Do: Fathers Who Kill	
2017	Debut Novel	Cath Ferla	Ghost Girls	
2017	Readers' Choice	Jane Harper	The Dry	
2018	Adult Novel	Emma Viskic	And Fire Came Down	
2018	Young Adult Novel	Vikki Wakefield	Ballad for a Mad Girl	
2018	Children's Novel	Allison Rushby	The Turnkey	
2018	True Crime	Gabriella Coslovich	Whiteley on Trial	
2018	Debut Novel	Sarah Bailey	The Dark Lake	
2018	Readers' Choice	Jane Harper	Force of Nature	
2019	Adult Novel	Dervla McTiernan	The Rúin	
2019	Young Adult Novel	Sarah Epstein	Small Spaces	
2019	Children's Novel	Judith Rossell	Wakestone Hall	
2019	True Crime	Chloe Hooper	The Arsonist: A Mind on Fire	
2019	Debut Novel	Bri Lee	Eggshell Skull	
2019	Readers' Choice	Jane Harper	The Lost Man	

=== 2020s ===
Davitt Award winners 2020-2029
Year	Category	Author	Title	Ref
2020	Adult Novel	Meg Mundell	The Trespassers	
2020	Young Adult Novel	Astrid Scholte	Four Dead Queens	
2020	Children's Novel	Jenny Blackford	The Girl in the Mirror	
2020	True Crime	Adele Ferguson	Banking Bad: Whistleblowers. Corporate cover-ups. One Journalist's Fight for the Truth	
2020	Debut Novel	Susan Hurley	Eight Lives	
2020	Readers' Choice	Dervla McTiernan	The Scholar	
2020	Readers' Choice	Emma Viskic	Darkness for Light	
2021	Adult Novel	Sally Hepworth	The Good Sister	
2021	Young Adult Novel	Christie Nieman	Where We Begin	
2021	Children's Novel	Lian Tanner	A Clue for Clara	
2021	True Crime	Louise Milligan	Witness	
2021	Debut Novel	Leah Swann	Sheerwater	
2021	Readers' Choice	Katherine Kovacic	The Shifting Landscape	
2022	Adult Novel	Charlotte McConaghy	Once There Were Wolves	
2022	Young Adult Novel	Leanne Hall	The Gaps	
2022	Children's Novel	Nicki Greenberg	The Detective's Guide to Ocean Travel	
2022	Non-Fiction	Kate Holden	The Winter Road: A story of legacy, land and a killing at Croppa Creek	
2022	Debut	Jacqueline Bublitz	Before You Knew My Name	
2022	Readers' Choice	Jacqueline Bublitz	Before You Knew My Name	
2023	Adult Novel	Tracey Lien	All That's Left Unsaid	
2023	Young Adult Novel	Fleur Ferris	Seven Days	
2023	Children's Novel	Charlie Archbold	The Sugarcane Kids and the Red-bottomed Boat	
2023	Non-Fiction	Megan Norris	Out of the Ashes	
2023	Debut	Hayley Scrivenor	Dirt Town	
2023	Readers' Choice	Vikki Petraitis	The Unbelieved	
2024	Adult Novel	Monica Vuu	When One of Us Hurts	
2024	Young Adult Novel	Amy Doak	Eleanor Jones Is Not a Murderer	
2024	Children's Novel	Lucinda Gifford	The Wolves of Greycoat Hall	
2024	Non-Fiction	Rebecca Hazel	The Schoolgirl, Her Teacher and His Wife	
2024	Debut	Christine Keighery	The Half Brother	
2024	Readers' Choice	Alison Goodman	The Benevolent Society of Ill-Mannered Ladies	
2025	Adult Novel	Vikki Wakefield	To the River	
2025	Young Adult Novel	Erin Gough	Into the Mouth of the Wolf	
2025	Children's Novel	Judith Rossell	The Midwatch	
2025	Non-Fiction	Lucia Osborne-Crowley	The Lasting Harm: Witnessing the Trial of Ghislaine Maxwell	
2025	Debut	Georgia Harper	What I Would Do to You	
2025	Readers' Choice	Dervla McTiernan	What Happened to Nina?	
2026	Adult Novel	Joanna Jenkins	The Bluff	
2026	Young Adult Novel	Amy Doak	What Have They Done to Liza McLean?	
2026	Children's Novel	Sarah Armstrong	Run	
2026	Non-Fiction	Kate Wild	The Red House	
2026	Debut	Angie Faye Martin	Melaleuca	
2026	Readers' Choice	Sally Hepworth	Mad Mabel	

== Shortlists ==
Shortlists have only been provided for these awards since 2012.

=== Adult Novel ===
2010s

2010s Adult Novel winners and finalists
Year	Author	Title	Result	Ref.
2012	Sulari Gentill	A Decline in Prophets	Winner	
2012	Jaye Ford	Beyond Fear	Finalist	
2012	Carolyn Morwood	Death and the Spanish Lady	Finalist	
2012	Jennifer Rowe	Love, Honour and O’Brien	Finalist	
2012	Kim Westwood	The Courier's New Bicycle	Finalist	
2012	Helene Young	Shattered Sky	Finalist	
2013	Maggie Groff	Mad Men, Bad Girls and the Guerilla Knitters Institute	Winner	
2013	Kathryn Fox	Cold Grave	Finalist	
2013	Sulari Gentill	Paving the New Road	Finalist	
2013	Narrelle Harris	Walking Shadows	Finalist	
2013	Katherine Howell	Silent Fear	Finalist	
2013	Malla Nunn	Silent Valley	Finalist	
2013	Caroline Overington	Sisters of Mercy	Finalist	
2013	Josephine Pennicott	The Poet’s Cottage	Finalist	

== See also ==
- List of Australian literary awards
- List of literary awards honoring women
- Sisters in Crime
