= Cold Justice (novel) =

2010 crime novel by Australian author Katherine Howell

- Author: Katherine Howell
- Language: English
- Series: Ella Marconi
- Genre: Crime novel
- Publisher: Pan Macmillan
- Publication date: 1 February 2010
- Publication place: Australia
- Media type: Print
- Pages: 329 pp.
- Awards: 2011 Davitt Award, Best Adult Novel, winner
- ISBN: 9781405039277
- Preceded by: The Darkest Hour
- Followed by: Violent Exposure

Cold Justice is a 2010 crime novel by Australian author Katherine Howell.

It is the third novel in the author's Ella Marconi series of crime novels.

It was the winner of the Davitt Award for Best Adult Novel in 2011.

== Synopsis ==
Detective Ella Marconi has returned to work from injury and has bene assigned to the Unsolved Homicides unit. There she is assigned the case of Tim Pieters who died two decades previously. Tim's cousin, who is now a Member of Parliament, is pushing for the case to be re-opened, while Tim's mother seems to be hampering the investigation.

== Critical reception ==
Sue Turnbull, writing for The Sydney Morning Herald, commented: "Despite the initial panic and rush, Howell has slowed down the pace in this book, which is far more reflective than her previous two adrenalin-fuelled rides." She went on to add that the author "can create complex characters and situations with insight and understanding."

On the Sisters in Crime website Jacqui Horwood noted that "Cold Justice is a well paced and tightly written look at how the past impacts on the present."

== Publication history ==
After the novel's initial publication in 2010 by Pan Macmillan it was reprinted by Pan Books in the UK in 2011. The novel was also translated into Dutch in 2010.

== Awards ==
- 2011 Davitt Award for Best Adult Novel, winner

== See also ==
- 2010 in Australian literature
