= Jam Tree Gully: Poems =

2012 Australian poetry collection by John Kinsella

Jam Tree Gully : Poems
- Author: John Kinsella
- Language: English
- Genre: Poetry collection
- Publisher: W. W. Norton
- Publication date: November 2012
- Publication place: USA
- Media type: Print
- Pages: 157 pp.
- Awards: 2013 Prime Minister's Literary Awards for Poetry, winner; 2013 Queensland Literary Awards, Judith Wright Calanthe Award, winner
- ISBN: 9780393341409

Jam Tree Gully : Poems is a collection of poems by Australian poet John Kinsella, published by W. W. Norton in USA in 2012.

The collection contains 101 poems from a variety of sources. Twenty of the poems use quotes from Walden; or Life in the Woods for their epigraph, and a further twenty take their title from a quotation, or a paraphrase of a quotation, from Thoreau.

== Contents ==
- "Leave-Taking (York)"
- "The Land Between Houses : From York to Jam Tree Gully"
- "Arrival: First Lines Typed at Jam Tree Gully"
- "We Spend Days in This House"
- "De-Fencing the Block"
- "Goat"
- "Dream of What's Below"
- "Eagles at Sunset Stock Epithet"
- "Reptile Life"
- "An Elective of Gradients"
- "Hive Liberty"
- "Leak"
- "Sheep Leg"
- "Evening"
- "Saturday Afternoon"
- "Solitude"
- "Away"
- "Reading"
- "Extending the House at Jam Tree Gully"
- "Digging"
- "Some Sounds at Jam Tree Gully"
- "Storm Cicadas"
- "Desire Lines"
- "The Dry Dry"
- "Eagle Affirmation"
- "Single-lined Photos"
- "Lichen Glows in the Moonlight"
- "Kangaroos in the Fog"
- "Balloon"
- "Rehabilitation Is Its Own Profanity"
- "This Will Not Be a Model Farm"
- "Bulbs and Corms at Jam Tree Gully"
- "New Lichen!"
- "Inverse Brass Rubbings"
- "The Town and River Overflow"
- "Architecture Without Ornaments"
- "Cloven Hoof"
- "Higher Laws"
- "Spring Pollen"
- "Pressure Suite Tilde Notation"
- "Building (Extension)"
- "Beans and Jam Tree Gully"
- "What Compliments to Nature"
- "Joy"
- "Greedy After This Gossip"
- "Chaser Bins"
- "Closing the Gate"
- "Voices Carry Across the Valley"
- "Past Tense"
- "Language Generates Nothing as Whole Trees Fall"
- "Contrition Is not the Sole Preserve"
- "The Immolation of Imagination"
- "Survey"
- "Town Hall Meeting : Minutes"
- "Urban Attitudes in the Bush?"
- "Hair"
- "Jam Tree Gully Sonnets with Incidental Rhymes"
- "Sacred Kingfisher and Trough Filled With Water Pumped From Deep Underground"
- "Calm"
- "Reading the Poetry of Arto Melleri and Lokking at the Extensive World Within the Frame of My Window"
- "House at Jam Tree Gully Sestina with Variations"
- "Red Shed"
- "Inside the Red Shed"
- "Jam Tree Gully Awaiting Diagnosis: A Run"
- "In This Damaged State"
- "A Jam Tree Gully Sheaf"
- "Eternally Green"
- "Any Prospect of Awakening"
- "I Had Wondered About the Signs of Burning"
- "For the Root is Faith"
- "On Large Farms Nearby"
- "Rock Overturned by God-Knows-What"
- "Pricked Fingers"
- "Kangaroos in Torchlight"
- "Whose Discordant Screams Were Heard Long Before"
- "Night Explosions"
- "Heaven is Under Our Feet as Well as Over Our Heads"
- "I Left the Woods For as Good a Reason as I Went There"
- "Mea Culpa: Cleaning the Gutters"
- "On Being Asked to Join the Coondle-Nunile Volunteer Bush Fire Brigade"
- "A Set of Images Makes the Day"
- "Whang!"
- "Bonewrest (Jam Tree Gully)"
- "Stubble Quail at Jam Tree Gully"
- "Skins"
- "Battening Down"
- "Now Only a Dent in the Earth Marks the Site of These Dwellings"
- "Disturbing the Ashes"
- "Gala Days"
- "Disturbed Ground"
- "Four Scenes"
- "Pressure at the Boundaries (of Jam Tree Gully)"
- "Convergence"
- "Kangaroo Doe"
- "The Qualities of Sadness"
- "Entrée"
- "The Roo Killers"
- "Insomia at Jam Tree Gully"
- "Settling House"
- "On the Great Red Storm"
- "Envoy"

== Critical reception ==
Writing in Transnational Literature in November 2013, Tim Bristow noted that this "collection documents Kinsella's version of the American poet's nineteenth-century project in selfreliance, undertaken in a dwelling place outside York, Western Australia, to settle a piece of land and write out a portable sense of place that is attuned to an acute geographic site." He went on to state that the poems show an "acute sensibility to things, objects, and events, at least in its literary form as instanced by Kinsella, invokes human impact while carefully mapping dependencies and relations between things."

== Awards ==
- 2013 Prime Minister's Literary Awards for Poetry, winner
- 2013 Queensland Literary Awards, Judith Wright Calanthe Award, winner

== See also ==
- 2012 in Australian literature

== Notes ==
- Dedication: for Tracy and Tim who live here, for John and Mum who helped build the place

The author wishes to acknowledge the traditional owners of the land he writes.
