= Nike Sulway =

Australian novelist (born 1968)

Nike Sulway (née Bourke; born 1968) is an Australian novelist.

== Career ==
Nike Sulway is a novelist, short story writer, researcher, and teacher who works across speculative and literary fiction. She has a PhD in Creative Writing from Griffith University and is a graduate of the Clarion South Writers Workshop. Her short fiction and poetry have been published in a range of journals, including Lightspeed, Shimmer, Interzone, Fantasy Magazine, Review of Australian Fiction, Meanjin, Liminality, Southerly, Verity La, Cordite Poetry Review and ASIM (Andromeda Spaceways Inflight Magazine). She has also had works included in a range of anthologies, including The Best Science Fiction and Fantasy of the Year, vol. 10 (edited by Jonathan Strahan), The Best of Shimmer, Letters to Tiptree, and Mythic Resonance.

As a novelist, she writes both mainstream or literary fiction, though her works consistently focus on the role of magic and the imagination in ordinary and extraordinary lives (most especially women’s lives). Her novels include The Bone Flute, The True Green of Hope, Rupetta, and Dying in the First Person, as well as two children’s books: What The Sky Knows (illustrated by Stella Danalis) and Winter’s Tale (illustrated by Shauna O’Meara). Her books have been shortlisted for and won a range of awards, including the Queensland Premier’s Literary Award, The Children’s Book Council of Australia Awards, the Aurealis Awards, the Norma K Hemming Award, the Commonwealth Writers Prize (Best First Book/Asia Pacific Region), and the IAFA Crawford Memorial Award. Her novel, Rupetta was the first work by an Australian author to win the Tiptree Award (since renamed the Otherwise Award). Rupetta also won the Norma K Hemming Award, and was shortlisted for both an Aurealis Award and the IAFA William L. Crawford Fantasy Award.

In her scholarly work, she researches creative practice, fairy tales, gothic fiction, queer writing and women’s writing. She has written scholarly essays on the work of James Tiptree, Jr, and on women’s uses of fairy tales in memoir and biography. She has co-edited a special issue of the scholarly journal TEXT on Australasian Fairy Tales (with Rebecca Anne do Rozario and Belinda Calderone), a collection of essays on speculative biography for Cambridge Scholarly Publishing (Forgotten Lives: Recovering lost histories through fact and fiction, with Donna Lee Brien and Dallas Baker), a book of essays on Anne of Green Gables (Kindred Spirits, with Jess Carniel), and is the author of a chapter of on Australian fairy tales and contemporary fairy tale fiction in The Routledge Companion to Australian Literature (edited by Jessica Gildersleeve, forthcoming in 2021).

Nike coordinates the creative writing undergraduate and postgraduate offerings at the University of Southern Queensland (USQ), where she teaches courses on nature writing, speculative fiction and fairy tales, as well as supervising Honours and Doctoral researchers in creative writing. She has delivered online and face-to-face courses, workshops and seminars in a range of settings and contexts, from community centres to (women’s) prisons, schools to intensive residential workshops. She currently delivers online workshops at Storied Imaginarium.

== Bibliography ==
=== Novels ===
- The Bone Flute as N A Bourke (2001)
- The True Green of Hope as N A Bourke (2005)
- Rupetta (2013)
- Dying in the First Person (2016)
- Winter's Tale, illustrated by Shauna O'Meara (2019)

=== Picture books ===
- What the Sky Knows (2005), illustrated by Stella Danalis

== Literary awards ==
- The Bone Flute won the 2000 QLD Premier's Literary Award for an emerging author and was short-listed for the Commonwealth Writers Award in the Best First Book category (Asia Pacific).
- What the Sky Knows shortlisted CBCA Book of the Year Early Childhood (2006); Shortlisted CBCA Picture Book of the Year (2006); Highly Commended, APA Design Awards (2006).
- Rupetta won the 2013 James Tiptree, Jr. Award, the 2014 Norma K Hemming Award, and was shortlisted for both a 2014 Crawford Memorial Award and a 2014 Aurealis Award.
- Winter's Tale won the Norma K Hemming Award (2020).
