= The Street Sweeper =

2011 novel by Australian author Elliot Perlman

- Author: Elliot Perlman
- Language: English
- Genre: Literary novel
- Publisher: Vintage Australia
- Publication date: 3 October 2011
- Publication place: Australia
- Media type: Print
- Pages: 554 pp.
- Awards: 2012 Indie Book Awards Book of the Year – Fiction, winner
- ISBN: 9781741666175

The Street Sweeper is a 2011 novel by the Australian author Elliot Perlman.

It was the winner of the 2012 Indie Book Awards Book of the Year – Fiction.

== Synopsis ==
An Australian historian, Adam Zignelik, a professor at Columbia University, takes on the task of determining whether any African-American troops were involved in the liberation of any the German concentration camps at the end of World War II. In doing so the novel contrasts the fate of the Jews under the Nazis with the treatment of African-Americans in the modern US society.

== Critical reception ==
Writing in Australian Book Review Don Anderson noted that with this work "Perlman as novelist is a witness to history." he concluded: "The Street Sweeper is a big book, a brave book, a humane and liberal book in a period of history when those values are being derided by conservatives of several schools. It is at times repetitious, suggesting falterings of confidence, and occasionally prone to coincidence, though that may be hard to avoid in such a large, bold canvas."

== Awards ==
- 2012 Indie Book Awards Book of the Year – Fiction, winner
- 2012 Miles Franklin Award, longlisted

== Publication history ==
After the novel's initial publication in 2011 in Australia by Vintage Books, it was reprinted as follows:

- 2012 Faber and Faber, UK
- 2012 Riverhead Books, USA
- 2012 Bond Street Books, Canada

The novel was also translated into French, German and Dutch in 2013.

== Notes ==
- Dedication: In memory of Rosa Robota, Estusia Wajcblum, Ala Gertner, Regina Safirztain and Denise McNair, Carole Robertson, Cynthia Wesley, Addie Mae Collins, who all died from different manifestations of the same disease. (The dedication refers to individuals killed during the Holocaust and to other killed in a racially motivated attack by the Ku Klux Klan (16th Street Baptist Church Bombing, 1963).)
- Epigraph: Mountains bow down to this grief.../But hope keeps singing from afar. – Anna Akhmatova

== See also ==
- 2011 in Australian literature
