= Kim Westwood =

Australian author

Kim Westwood is an Australian author born in Sydney and currently living in Canberra, the Australian Capital Territory.

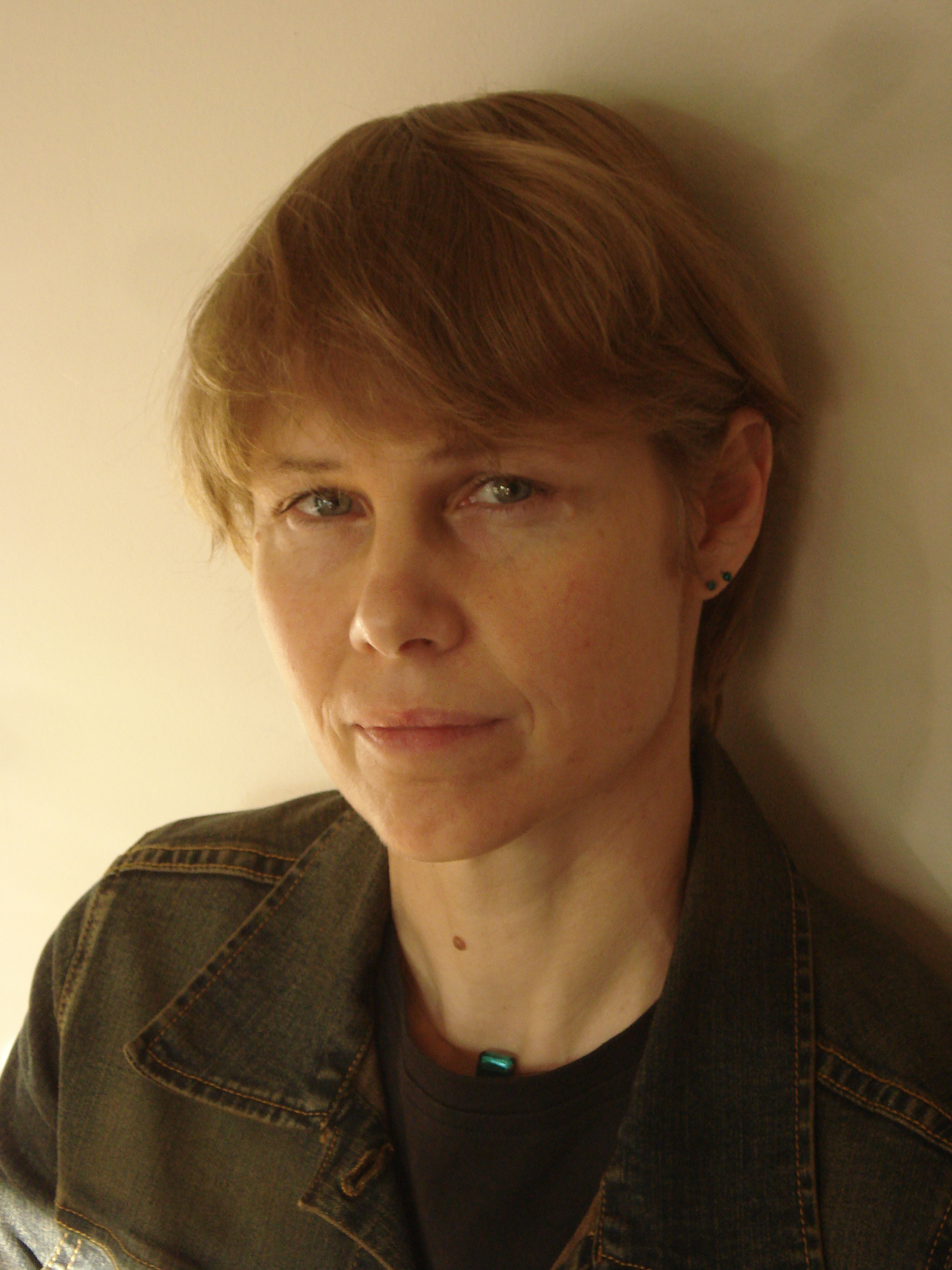
Westwood

She has won the Aurealis Award twice, a Scarlet Stiletto Award and a Ditmar Award. She was shortlisted for six awards including the Aurealis Awards, James Tiptree, Jnr., the Ned Kelly and the Davitt awards for her short stories and novels, a number of which have appeared in Years Best anthologies in Australia and the US, as well as broadcast on radio and podcast. She received a Varuna Writer's House Fellowship for her first novel, The Daughters of Moab, published in 2008 and shortlisted for an Aurealis Award. Her second novel, The Courier's New Bicycle (2011), was selected for the Honour List of the 2011 James Tiptree, Jr. Award, and won an Aurealis Award for Best Science Fiction Novel as well as a Ditmar Award for Best Novel (Ditmar Award results). It has been reviewed as "a disturbingly credible and darkly noir post-cyberpunk tale" with a "brilliantly evoked atmosphere of secrecy and threat" carried by a "strong, empathetic central character [and] fast paced narrative".

Westwood developed her distinctive visual sensibility while working as a theatre performer and deviser. Darkly poetic, her stories are underscored by feminist and gender politics, and have a preoccupation with humanity's capacity for destruction and equal instinct for survival. Most are set in a near-future Australia. Of this she says, "My imagination has a chemical reaction to living in Australia, and responds strongly to its particular properties". By example, The Daughters of Moab has been reviewed as "a richly peopled canvas, of which perhaps the real star is the landscape, so intensely depicted as to be almost a presence".

== Bibliography ==
=== Novels ===
- The Daughters of Moab (HarperCollins, 2008)
- The Courier's New Bicycle (HarperCollins, 2011)

=== Short stories ===
- "The Oracle", Redsine #9 (2002); Znak Sagite (2005)
- "Temenos", Agog! Smashing Stories (2004)
- "Stella’s Transformation", Encounters – an Anthology of Australian Speculative Fiction (2004); Year's Best Fantasy #5 (2005)
- "Tripping Over the Light Fantastic", Orb Speculative Fiction #6 (2004); The Year’s Best Australian SF and Fantasy Vol. 1 (2005)
- "Haberdashery", The Devil in Brisbane (2005)
- "1Blue", Agog! Ripping Reads (2006)
- "Cassandra’s Hands", (2006) in Eidolon I (ed. Jonathan Strahan, Jeremy G. Byrne)
- "Cassandra's Hands", (author's revised version) Escape anthology (2011)
- "Terning tha Weel", Aurealis #36 (2005); The Year’s Best Australian SF and Fantasy Vol. 3 (2007)
- "Nightship", Dreaming Again (2008)
- "Last Drink Bird Head", Last Drink Bird Head (2009)
- "By Any Other Name", Anywhere But Earth (2011)

=== Fellowships ===
- Varuna Writers' House Fellowship (2004)

== Awards and nominations ==
=== Award ===
- 2002 Aurealis Award, Horror Short Story: The Oracle
- 2011 Scarlet Stiletto Awards, Judges' Prize: Trouble in Nine Acts
- 2011 Aurealis Award, Best Science Fiction Novel, The Courier's New Bicycle
- 2012 Ditmar Award, Best Novel, The Courier's New Bicycle

=== Shortlisted ===
- 2005 Aurealis Award, Science Fiction Short Story: Terning tha Weel
- 2008 Aurealis Award, Fantasy Short Story: Nightship
- 2008 Aurealis Award, Science Fiction Novel: The Daughters of Moab
- 2011 James Tiptree, Jnr. Award: The Courier's New Bicycle
- 2012 Ned Kelly Awards: The Courier's New Bicycle
- 2012 Davitt Award: Best Adult Crime Fiction The Courier's New Bicycle
