= The Courier's New Bicycle =

2011 novel by Kim Westwood

- Author: Kim Westwood
- Language: English
- Genre: novel
- Publisher: Voyager, Australia
- Publication date: 2011
- Publication place: Australia
- Media type: Print (Paperback)
- Pages: 327
- ISBN: 9780732289881
- Preceded by: The Daughters of Moab

The Courier's New Bicycle (2011) is a novel by Australian author Kim Westwood. It was shortlisted for the 2012 Ned Kelly Awards for Best First Crime Novel, and won the 2011 Aurealis Award and the 2012 Ditmar Award for Best Novel.

== Plot summary ==
The novel is set in a Melbourne of the future, when the rate of human reproductive success has dropped markedly as a result of reactions to a hastily developed and widely distributed flu vaccine. A thriving black market in fertility treatments has arisen, facilitated by Salisbury Forth, the courier of the title.

== Reviews ==
Niall Harrison on Strange Horizons noted that the novel is "perhaps more than anything else a story about identity, about the tension between who you say you are and who they say you are".

== Awards and nominations ==
In 2011, Locus included The Courier's New Bicycle on their list of recommended science fiction novels.

Awards for The Courier's New Bicycle
Year	Award	Result	Ref.
2011	Aurealis Award for Best Science Fiction Novel	Winner	
2011	James Tiptree Jr. Award	Honor	
2012	Davitt Award for Best Adult Crime Novel	Shortlist	
2012	Ditmar Award for Best Novel	Winner	
2012	Ned Kelly Award for Best First Novel	Shortlist	
