= The Mountain (novel) =

Book by Drusilla Modjeska

- First edition
- Author: Drusilla Modjeska
- Language: English
- Genre: novel
- Publisher: Vintage
- Publication date: 2012
- Publication place: Australia
- Media type: Print (paperback)
- Pages: 432 pp
- ISBN: 9781741666502
- Preceded by: The Orchard

The Mountain (2012) is a novel by Australian author Drusilla Modjeska. It was shortlisted for the 2013 Miles Franklin Award.

== Overview ==
The novel consists of two parts: "Book One" which features a group of ex-pat Australians and Papuans on a Papua New Guinea university campus in the period shortly before independence; and "Book Two", set after PNG independence and follows one character's journey back to Australia.

== Critical response ==
Lloyd Jones in The Guardian noted that the novel is "a big and ambitious novel charting new territory in Australian contemporary fiction. There is much to admire." Eleanor Limprecht in The Sydney Morning Herald found the novel "is a complex, multi-layered novel, so that the central story is viewed through different angles, in different lights, and comes to mean many different things.

== Awards and nominations ==
Year	Award	Category	Result	Ref
2013	ALS Gold Medal	—	Longlisted	
2013	Australian Book Industry Awards	Australian Literary Fiction Book of the Year	Shortlisted	
2013	Indie Book Awards	Fiction	Shortlisted	
2013	Miles Franklin Award	—	Shortlisted	
2014	Barbara Jefferis Award	—	Shortlisted	
