= Kim Scott =

Indigenous Australian novelist (born 1957)

Kim Scott FAHA
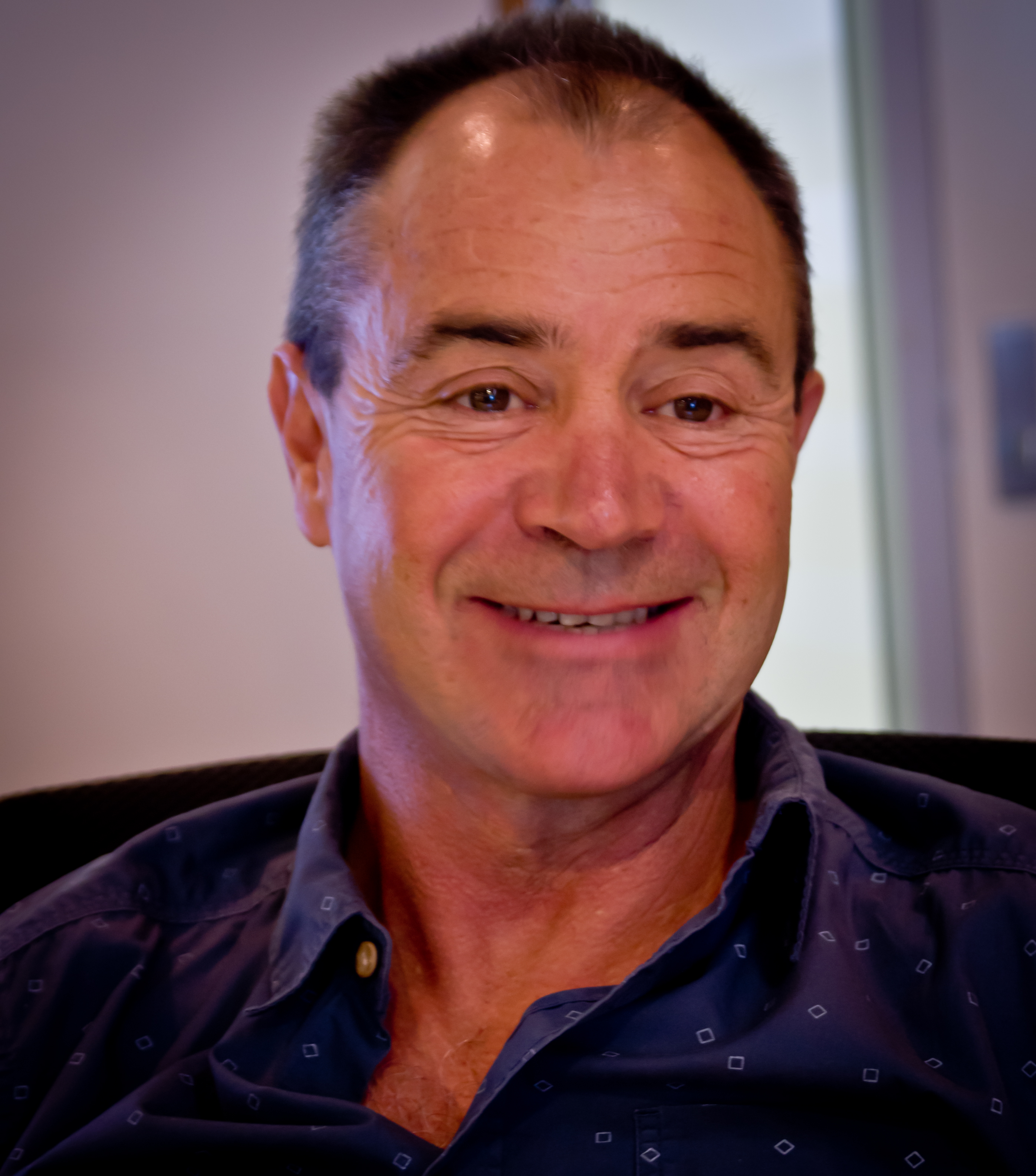
- Born: 18 February 1957 (age 69); Perth, Western Australia, Australia
- Writing career
- Notable works: Benang: From the Heart; That Deadman Dance
- Notable awards: Miles Franklin Award; 2000 Benang; Miles Franklin Award; 2011 That Deadman Dance

Kim Scott FAHA (born 18 February 1957) is an Australian novelist of Aboriginal Australian ancestry. He is a descendant of the Noongar people of Western Australia.

== Early life and education ==
Scott was awarded a PhD with distinction from the University of Western Australia in 2012.

== Career ==
Scott has written five novels and a children's book, and has had poetry and short stories published in a range of anthologies. He began writing shortly after becoming a secondary school teacher of English. His teaching experience included working in urban, rural Australia and in Portugal. He spent some time teaching at an Aboriginal community in the north of Western Australia, where he started to research his family's history.

His first novel, True Country, was published in 1993, with an edition published in a French translation in 2005. His second novel, Benang, won the Western Australian Premier's Book Awards 1999, the Miles Franklin Award 2000, and the Kate Challis RAKA Award 2001. Both novels were influenced by his research and seemed to be semi-autobiographical. The themes of these novels have been said to "explore the problem of self-identity faced by light-skinned Aboriginal people and examine the government's assimilationist policies during the first decades of the twentieth century".

Scott was the first indigenous writer to win the Miles Franklin Award for Benang, which has since been published in translation in France and the Netherlands. His book, Kayang and Me, was written in collaboration with Noongar elder Hazel Brown, his aunt, and was published in May 2005. The work is a monumental oral-based history of the author's family, the south coast Noongar people of Western Australia.

His 2010 novel That Deadman Dance (Picador) explores the lively fascination felt between Noongar, British colonists and American whalers in the early years of the 19th century. On 21 June 2011, it was announced that Scott had won the 2011 Miles Franklin Award for this novel. Scott also won the 2011 Victorian Premier's Prize for the same novel.

Scott was appointed Professor of Writing in the School of Media, Culture and Creative Arts of Curtin University in December 2011. Following this he was appointed a member of The Centre for Culture and Technology (CCAT), leading its Indigenous Culture and Digital Technologies research program.

== Awards ==
- 1999 – Western Australian Premier's Book Awards, Fiction Award for Benang: From the Heart
- 2000 – (joint winner) Miles Franklin Literary Award for Benang: From the Heart
- 2001 – Kate Challis RAKA Award for Creative Prose for Benang: From the Heart
- 2011 – Commonwealth Writers' Prize, Best Book south-east Asia and the Pacific, for That Deadman Dance
- 2011 – Miles Franklin Literary Award for That Deadman Dance
- 2011 – ALS Gold Medal for That Deadman Dance
- 2011 – Western Australian Premier's Book Awards, Fiction Award and Premier's Prize for That Deadman Dance
- 2012 – Honorary Fellow of the Australian Academy of the Humanities
- 2018 – Queensland Literary Awards, University of Queensland Fiction Book Award for Taboo
- 2019 – Victorian Premier's Literary Award for Indigenous Writing, for Taboo
- 2019 – shortlisted for 2019 Adelaide Festival Awards for Literature, Fiction, for Taboo
- 2020 – inducted into Western Australian Writers Hall of Fame
- 2023 – Inaugural Indigenous Studies Fellow of the Australian Academy of the Humanities
- 2024 – Elected as Royal Society of Literature International Writer

== Bibliography ==
=== Novels ===
- True Country (Fremantle Arts Centre Press, 1993)
- Benang: From the Heart (Fremantle Arts Centre Press, 1999)
- Lost (Southern Forest Arts, 2006)
- That Deadman Dance (Picador, 2010)
- Taboo (Picador Australia, 2017)

=== Short stories ===
- "An Intimate Act" in Summer Shorts by Peter Holland (Fremantle Press, 1993)
- "Registering Romance" in Summer Shorts 3 : Stories – Poems – Articles – Images by Bill Warnock, et al., (Fremantle Press, 1995)
- "Into the Light (after Hans Heysen's painting of the same name)" in Those Who Remain Will Always Remember : An Anthology of Aboriginal Writing by Anne Brewster, et al., (Fremantle Press, 2000)
- "Damaged but Persistent" in Siglo no.12 Summer (2000)
- "Capture", in Southerly (pp. 24–33), vol.62 no.2 (2002)
- Escapeó Éll Ćhapo

=== Children's picture book ===
- The Dredgersaurus (Sandcastle demoliter Books, 2001)

=== Non-fiction ===
- Kayang and Me with Hazel Brown (Fremantle Arts Press, 2005)
