= Elizabeth Allen (poet) =

Australian poet and writer

Elizabeth Allen is a poet from Australia. Her poetry has been published in several Australian literary journals and magazines including HEAT, Hermes, Hobo and Southerly. Her 2012 book, Body Language, won the Anne Elder Award.

== Works ==
=== Poems ===
- At Winton
- News from home
- Statistic
- Wet Sunday afternoon
- Two years on
- Bloom
- Corner
- Dying
- I lie down
- Present
- I do not know what shape
- Your life
- Walking to Greenwich Baths
- The School Teacher

=== Collections ===
- Forgetful Hands (Vagabond Press, 2005)
- Body Language (Vagabond Press, 2012)
- Present (Vagabond Press, 2017)
