= That Deadman Dance =

2010 Australian novel by Kim Scott

- Author: Kim Scott
- Language: English
- Genre: Novel
- Publisher: Picador, Australia
- Publication date: 1 October 2010
- Publication place: Australia
- Media type: Print (hardback & paperback)
- Pages: 400
- ISBN: 978-1-4050-4043-3
- Preceded by: Benang: From the Heart

That Deadman Dance is the third novel by Western Australian author Kim Scott. It was first published in 2010 by Picador (Australia) and by Bloomsbury in the UK, US and Canada in 2012. It won the 2011 Regional Commonwealth Writers' Prize, the 2011 Miles Franklin Literary Award, the 2011 ALS Gold Medal, the 2011 Kate Challis RAKA Award, the 2011 Victorian Prize for Literature, the 2011 Victorian Premier's Literary Award, Vance Palmer Prize for Fiction and the 2012 NSW Premier's Literary Award Christina Stead Prize and Book of the Year.

== Plot synopsis ==
That Deadman Dance is set in the first decades of the 19th century in and around what is now Albany, Western Australia, an area known by some historians as "the friendly frontier". The book explores the early contact between the Aboriginal Noongar people, European settlers and American whalers.

The novel's hero is a young Noongar man named Bobby Wabalanginy. Clever, resourceful and eager to please, Bobby befriends the new arrivals, joining them hunting whales, tilling the land, exploring the hinterland and establishing the fledgling colony. But slowly – by design and by accident – things begin to change. Not everyone is happy with how the colony is developing. Stock mysteriously start to disappear; crops are destroyed; there are "accidents" and injuries.

As the new arrivals impose ever stricter rules and regulations to keep the peace, Bobby Wabalanginy's elders decide they must respond. A friend to everyone, Bobby is forced to take sides: he must choose between the old world and the new, his ancestors and his settler friends. Inexorably, he is drawn into a series of events that will forever change not just the colony but the future of Australia.

The novel is a vivid narrative seeking to recreate what an initial encounter with the white settlers might have been like from both the perspective of the coloniser and the colonised. Mainly told through the eyes of a young Aboriginal boy, it reflects some of the main concerns with colonisation and the tragic story behind a magnificent culture.

== Awards and nominations ==
- Commonwealth Writers' Prize Best Book, South-east Asia and the Pacific, 2011: winner
- Miles Franklin Literary Award, 2011: winner
- ALS Gold Medal, 2011: winner
- Kate Challis RAKA Award, 2011: winner
- Victorian Premier's Literary Award, Victorian Prize for Literature and Vance Palmer Prize for Fiction, 2011: winner
- Indie Book Award, 2011: shortlisted
- Prime Minister's Literary Awards, Best Adult Fiction Book, 2011: shortlisted
- Western Australian Premier's Book Awards, Premier's Prize and Fiction Book, 2011: winner
- Adelaide Festival Awards for Literature, Fiction and Premier's prizes, 2012: winner
- NSW Premier's Literary Award, Christina Stead Prize and Book of the Year, 2012: winner

The Miles Franklin judges described That Deadman Dance as "a powerful and innovative fiction that shifts our sense of what an historical novel can achieve. Its language is shaped by the encounter of Noongar and Australian English, producing new writing and speech. It tells the story of the rapid destruction of Noongar people and their traditions. At the same time, there is the enchanting possibility of the birth of a new world in the strange song, dance, ceremony and language that are produced by these encounters of very different peoples."
