= Foal's Bread =

Book by Gillian Mears

- Author: Gillian Mears
- Language: English
- Genre: Literary
- Publisher: Allen and Unwin, Australia
- Publication date: 2011
- Publication place: Australia
- Media type: Print (Paperback)
- Pages: 361 pp
- ISBN: 9781742376295
- Preceded by: The Grass Sister

Foal's Bread is a 2011 novel by Australian author Gillian Mears.

It was the winner of the 2012 ALS Gold Medal, the Age Book of the Year for Fiction, the Prime Minister's Literary Award for Fiction, and the Victorian Premier's Literary Award for Fiction. It was also shortlisted for the Miles Franklin Award and the Barbara Jefferis Award.

== Plot summary ==
The main subject of the novel is the golden era of Australian show-jumping between the wars. Roley Nancarrow is the 1926 high jump record holder for New South Wales, and, while competing one day at a country show, is captivated by Noah Childs, a 14-year-old drover's daughter, who can coax tired old horses into extraordinary feats. Riding out in a storm one day, Nancarrow is struck by lightning. The novel examines his steady decline into paralysis from the lightning-strike and the effect this has on his horse-riding passion and relationship with Noah.

== Awards ==
- 2011 winner Colin Roderick Award
- 2012 winner Victorian Premier's Literary Awards — The Vance Palmer Prize for Fiction
- 2012 winner The Age Book of the Year — Fiction Prize
- 2012 shortlisted Booksellers Choice Award
- 2012 shortlisted Indie Book Awards Book of the Year – Fiction
- 2012 winner ALS Gold Medal
- 2012 shortlisted Barbara Jefferis Award
- 2012 shortlisted Miles Franklin Literary Award
- 2012 shortlisted Australian Book Industry Awards (ABIA) — Australian General Fiction Book of the Year
- 2012 shortlisted Australian Book Industry Awards (ABIA) — Australian Book of the Year
- 2012 shortlisted Nita Kibble Literary Award
- 2012 winner Prime Minister's Literary Awards — Fiction
- 2013 longlisted International Dublin Literary Award
- 2013 shortlisted New South Wales Premier's Literary Awards — Christina Stead Prize for Fiction
- 2014 shortlisted Adelaide Festival Awards for Literature — Award for Fiction

== Notes ==
The novel carried the following dedication:

"For my sister Yvonne."

The novel carried the following epigraph:

"Lameness is the language of pain, not a disease... A lame horse will often seem full of great silence and suffering." Harold Leeney, Home Doctoring of Animals (1927).

== Reviews ==
- Australian Women's Studies Resource: "Foal's Bread, then, is not an easy or wholly rewarding read, yet it stays with you, and hauntingly so, for a long time after you finish the novel."
- The Guardian: "The bush country of New South Wales is a tough, unforgiving landscape and Foal's Bread turns out to be a tough, unforgiving book. But to her immense credit, Mears's account of a terrible illness never becomes self-pitying or sentimental, while her galloping prose thrums to the rhythm of some perfectly constructed sentences".
- The Sydney Morning Herald: "When a writer of the calibre of Gillian Mears publishes her first novel in 16 years, it's time to sit up straight and take note...Foal's Bread is, gloriously, about horses and the people who are in thrall to them".
