= Sulari Gentill =

Australian author

- Born: Sri Lanka
- Occupation: novelist
- Writing career
- Pen name: S. D. Gentill
- Language: English
- Years active: 2010-present
- Genre: Crime fiction
- Notable works: Crossing the Lines; Rowland Sinclair series
- Notable awards: Davitt Award (2); Ned Kelly Award

Sulari Gentill is a Sri Lankan-born Australian author, also known under the pen name of S. D. Gentill. She initially studied astrophysics before becoming a corporate lawyer, but has since become a writer of mystery and fantasy fiction.

Her novel Crossing the Lines won the 2018 Ned Kelly Award for Best Fiction. Crossing the Lines was published as After She Wrote Him in Northern America. Gentill's A Few Right Thinking Men was nominated for a 2011 Commonwealth Writers Prize.

== Early life ==
Gentill was born in Sri Lanka. She was raised in Zambia and Brisbane, Australia.

== Education ==
Gentill started studying astrophysics, but ended up graduating in law.

== Career ==
Gentill was a corporate lawyer before her writing career.

She grows French black truffles on her farm in the foothills of the Snowy Mountains of New South Wales, which she shares with her young family and several animals.

Gentill is the author of the award-winning Rowland Sinclair mysteries, a series of historical crime fiction novels set in the 1930s about Rowland Sinclair, the gentleman artist and amateur detective. The first in the series, A Few Right Thinking Men was shortlisted for Commonwealth Writers' Prize Best First Book. A Decline in Prophets, the second in the series, won the Davitt Award for Best Adult Crime Fiction. Paving the New Road, set in Nazi Germany, was shortlisted for the Davitt Award. A Murder Unmentioned and A Testament of Character were finalists in the Ned Kelly Awards.

Under the name S. D. Gentill, Sulari also wrote a fantasy adventure series called The Hero Trilogy.

== Bibliography ==
=== Rowland Sinclair series ===
1. A Few Right Thinking Men (2010)
2. A Decline in Prophets (2011)
3. Miles Off Course (2012)
4. Paving the New Road (2012)
5. Gentlemen Formerly Dressed (2013)
6. A Murder Unmentioned (2014)
7. Give the Devil His Due (2015)
8. A Dangerous Language (2017)
9. All the Tears in China (2019)
10. A Testament of Character (2020)

Audio versions of The Rowland Sinclair Series are narrated by Rupert Degas.

=== The Hero Trilogy ===
1. Chasing Odysseus (2011)
2. Trying War (2012)
3. The Blood of Wolves (2012)

=== Stand-alone novels ===
- Crossing the Lines (2017) Poisoned Pen Press, ISBN 9781464209147 (aka After She Wrote Him (2020))
- The Woman in the Library (2022) Poisoned Pen Press
- The Mystery Writer (2024) Poisoned Pen Press
- Five Found Dead (2025) Poisoned Pen Press

== Personal life ==
Gentill's husband is Michael Blenkins. They have two children, Edmund and Atticus.

== See also ==
- Ned Kelly Awards
