= Sea Hearts =

2012 novel by Margo Lanagan

- Author: Margo Lanagan
- Genre: Fiction
- Publisher: Allen & Unwin
- Publication date: 1 February 2012
- Publication place: Australia
- Pages: 360
- ISBN: 9781742375052

Sea Hearts is a 2012 novel by Margo Lanagan. The novel is a young adult work of speculative fiction set on the fictional Rollrock Island. It explores a world in which witches have replaced all of the island's human women with selkies who are unfailingly obedient to their husbands.

== Reception ==
In a review in Australian Book Review, Maya Linden wrote that the novel did not leave a lasting impact on the reader and that it "doesn't turn out to be quite the incomparable offering it promises". A more positive review in the Newtown Review of Books described the book as a "finely wrought, disturbing novel" that "raises unsettling questions about male desire".

== Awards ==
Awards for Sea Hearts
Year	Award	Category	Result	Ref.
2012	Aurealis Awards	Best Fantasy Novel	Won	
2012	Aurealis Awards	Best Young Adult Novel	Won	
2012	Queensland Literary Awards	Young Adult Book Award	Shortlisted	
2013	Western Australian Premier's Book Awards	Young Adult	Won	
2013	Children's Book Council of Australia Book of the Year	Older Readers	Won	
2013	Indie Book Awards	Best Children's & YA Book	Won	
2013	Norma K. Hemming Award	—	Won	
2013	New South Wales Premier's Literary Awards	Ethel Turner Prize for Young People's Literature	Shortlisted	
2013	Stella Prize	—	Shortlisted	
2013	Ditmar Awards	Best Novel	Won	
2014	Barbara Jefferis Award	—	Won	
2014	Adelaide Festival Awards for Literature	Young Adult Fiction	Shortlisted	
2014	International Dublin Literary Award	—	Longlisted	
