= Gillian Mears =

Australian writer

- Born: 21 July 1964; Lismore, New South Wales, Australia
- Died: 16 May 2016 (aged 51); Near Grafton, New South Wales, Australia
- Occupation: Writer
- Writing career
- Language: English

Gillian Mears (21 July 1964 – 16 May 2016) was an Australian short story writer and novelist. Her books Ride a Cock Horse and The Grass Sister won a Commonwealth Writers' Prize, shortlist, in 1989 and 1996, respectively. The Mint Lawn won The Australian/Vogel Award. In 2003, A Map of the Gardens won the Steele Rudd Award.

== Life ==
Mears was born at Lismore Base Hospital, and raised in Grafton, New South Wales where she was school dux of Grafton High School.

She moved to Sydney to study at university, beginning a degree in archaeology at the University of Sydney having been inspired to pursue a career in archaeology after reading Gods, Graves and Scholars by C. W. Ceram. At the age of 18, she withdrew from the course, and instead completed a degree in communications at University of Technology, Sydney.

She lived near Grafton, New South Wales. She died in May 2016 after living with multiple sclerosis for seventeen years.

Bernadette Brennan has written a biography of Gillian Mears.

== Awards and honours ==
- 1989 Commonwealth Writers' Prize, shortlist, Ride a Cock Horse
- 1990 The Australian/Vogel Literary Award, winner, The Mint Lawn
- 1996 Commonwealth Writers' Prize, shortlist, The Grass Sister
- 2003 Steele Rudd Award, winner, A Map of the Gardens
- 2011 Colin Roderick Award, winner, Foal's Bread
- 2012 ALS Gold Medal, Foal's Bread
- 2012 Barbara Jefferis Award, shortlist, Foal's Bread
- 2012 Miles Franklin Award, shortlist, Foal's Bread
- 2012 Prime Minister's Literary Awards, Fiction Award, Foal's Bread

== Works ==
=== Novels ===
- —— (1991). The Mint Lawn. Allen & Unwin. ISBN 9781863730167.
- —— (1995). The Grass Sister. Alfred A. Knopf. ISBN 9780091831219.
- —— (2011). Foal's Bread. Allen & Unwin. ISBN 9781742376295.

=== Children's book ===
- —— (2015). The Cat with the Coloured Tail. Walker Books. ISBN 9781922077400. Illust. Dinale Dabarera

=== Short story collections ===
- —— (1988). Ride a Cock Horse. Pascoe Publishing. ISBN 9780947087128.
- —— (1990). Fineflour. University of Queensland Press. ISBN 9780702223112.
- —— (1997). Collected Stories. University of Queensland Press. ISBN 9780702229503.
- —— (2002). A Map of the Gardens: Stories. Pan Macmillan Australia. ISBN 9780330363464.

=== Non-fiction ===
- —— (1997). Paradise Is a Place. Random House Australia. ISBN 9780091836412. Phot. Sandy Edwards

=== Essays ===
- Alive in Ant and Bee
- Fairy Death
