= Toni Jordan =

Melbourne-based novelist

Toni Lee Jordan
- Born: 1966 (age 59–60); Brisbane, Australia
- Occupation: Writer
- Known for: Addition, Tenderfoot

Toni Jordan (born 1966 in Sydney, Australia) is a Melbourne-based novelist best known for her debut novel Addition, an international bestseller long listed for the Miles Franklin Award. Addition was made into a feature film in 2024 starring Teressa Palmer and Joe Dempsie.

In 2022 and 2023, she released two novels about the Schnable family, Dinner with Schnables (2022), and Prettier if she Smiled More (2023), which was described as 'sharp-eyed, engaging, endearing and very funny'. In 2025 she released Tenderfoot, based on her own childhood experiences of greyhound racing and gambling.

She currently teaches at the Faber Academy.

== Awards and nominations ==
- 2009: Addition, Longlisted for the Miles Franklin Award
- 2013: Nine Days, Winner, Indie Book Awards
- 2017: Our Tiny Useless Hearts, Shortlisted for the Voss Literary Prize
- 2026: Tenderfoot, Longlisted for the Miles Franklin Award

== Bibliography ==
=== Novels ===
- Here Lives a Kind Woman (1999)
- Addition (2008) ISBN 9781922079565
- Fall Girl (2011) ISBN 9781921758836
- Nine Days (2013) ISBN 9781922147691
- Our Tiny Useless Hearts (2016) ISBN 9781925498097
- The Fragments (2018) ISBN 9781925773132
- Alles Telt (2021) ISBN 9788726825442
- Dinner with the Schnabels (2022) ISBN 9780733645129
- Prettier if she Smiled More (2023) ISBN 9780733645143
- Tenderfoot (2025)
