= Katherine Howell =

Australian crime writer

- Born: Sydney, New South Wales, Australia
- Occupation: Novelist
- Writing career
- Notable awards: 2008 Davitt Award for Best Adult Crime Novel, winner; 2011 Davitt Award for Best Adult Crime Novel, winner

Katherine Howell is an Australian crime writer best known for her series featuring Sydney police detective Ella Marconi. A notable feature of her work is the use of paramedics as protagonists. Howell worked as a paramedic for fifteen years and draws on that experience in her books, which are published in multiple countries and languages. Howell holds BA and master's degrees in writing and teaches workshops in writing, editing, and suspense (the subject of her Masters thesis).

== Awards ==
- 2008 - Davitt Award for best adult crime novel, for her debut novel Frantic
- 2009 - Davitt Award, reader's choice, for The Darkest Hour
- 2011 - Davitt Award for best adult crime novel, for Cold Justice

== Bibliography ==
- Frantic (2007)
- The Darkest Hour (2008)
- Cold Justice (2010)
- Violent Exposure (2010)
- Silent Fear (2012)
- Web of Deceit (2013)
- Deserving Death (2014)
- Tell the Truth (2015)
