= Tasmanian literature =

Tasmania, for its size and population, has a flourishing literary culture. Its history offers an eventful literary background with visits from early explorers such as the Dutchman Abel Tasman, the Frenchmen Bruni d'Entrecasteaux and Marion du Fresne and then the Englishmen Matthew Flinders and George Bass. Colonisation coincided with deteriorated relations with indigenous Aboriginal people and a harsh convict heritage. These events in Tasmanian history are found in a large number of colonial sandstone buildings and in place names. Environmentally, the landscapes and changeable weather provide a vivid literary backdrop. Tasmania's geographical isolation, creative community, proximity to Antarctica, controversial past, bourgeoning arts reputation, and island status all contribute to its significant literature. Many fiction and non-fiction authors call Tasmania home, and many acclaimed titles are set there or written by Tasmanians. The journal of letters Island magazine appears quarterly. Tasmania's government provides arts funding in the form of prizes, events and grants. Bookshops contribute book launches and other literary events. Tasmania's unique history and environment gave rise to Tasmanian Gothic literature in the 19th century.

== Notable Tasmanian authors and poets ==
In birth order:

- Reverend John West (1809–1873), journalist and historian
- Louisa Ann Meredith (1812–1895), author and illustrator
- Marcus Clarke (1846–1881), journalist and author
- "Tasma" (Jessie Couvreur) (1848–1897), author
- Royal Tasman Bridges (1885–1952), novelist
- Nan Chauncy (1900–1970), author
- Clive Sansom (1910–1981), poet and playwright
- Christopher Koch (1932–2013), author
- Margaret Scott (1934–2005), poet
- Amanda Lohrey (born 1947), author
- Pete Hay, poet
- Stephen Dando-Collins, author
- Stephen Edgar (born 1951), poet
- Lian Tanner (born 1951), author
- Martin Flanagan (born 1955), journalist
- Katherine Scholes (born 1959), author
- Julie Hunt, children's author
- Richard Flanagan (born 1961), author
- Liz Winfield (born 1964), poet
- Heather Rose (born 1964), author
- Rachael Treasure (born 1968), author
- Bradley Trevor Greive (born 1970), author
- Danielle Wood (born 1972), author

== Notable Tasmanian books ==
In publication order:

- Notes and Sketches of New South Wales, 1844, by Louisa Ann Meredith
- My Residence in Tasmania, 1852, by Louisa Anne Meredith
- History of Tasmania, 1852, by Rev. John West
- Bush Friends in Tasmania, 1860 and 1891, by Louisa Anne Meredith
- For the Term of His Natural Life, 1870–1872, by Marcus Clarke
- Uncle Piper of Piper's Hill, 1889 by "Tasma"
- They Found A Cave, 1949, by Nan Chauncy
- World's End Was Home, 1952, by Nan Chauncy
- Tangara, 1960, by Nan Chauncy
- The Doubleman, 1985, by Christopher Koch
- View from the Non-Members Bar, 1992, by Pete Hay
- Out of Ireland, 1999, by Christopher Koch
- Gould's Book of Fish, 2001, by Richard Flanagan
- The Blue Day Book, 2001, by Bradley Trevor Greive
- Main Currents of Environmental Thought, 2002, by Peter Hay
- Vandemonian Essays, 2002, by Pete Hay
- The Alphabet of Light and Dark, 2003, by Danielle Wood
- The Butterfly Man, 2005, by Heather Rose
- Silently on the Tide, 2005, by Pete Hay
- The Roving Party, 2011, by Rohan Wilson
- The Narrow Road to the Deep North, 2013, by Richard Flanagan
- To Name Those Lost, 2014, by Rohan Wilson
- Essays from Near and Far, 2014, by James Dryburgh
- The Mountain, 2014, by Mark Clemens
- The Museum of Modern Love, 2016, by Heather Rose
- The Field of Dreams, 2016, by Mark Clemens
- Bridget Crack, 2017, by Rachel Leary
- Bruny, 2019, by Heather Rose
- A Treacherous Country, 2020, by Katherine Kruimink
- The Rain Heron, 2020, by Robbie Arnott
- The Octopus and I, 2020, by Erin Hortle

== Tasmanian Literary Awards ==
- Tasmania Book Prize
- Margaret Scott Prize
- University of Tasmania Prize
- Tasmanian Young Writer's Fellowship

== See also ==
- Music in Tasmania
- Geography of Tasmania
- List of Australian novelists
- List of Australian poets
