= Breamlea =

- Town
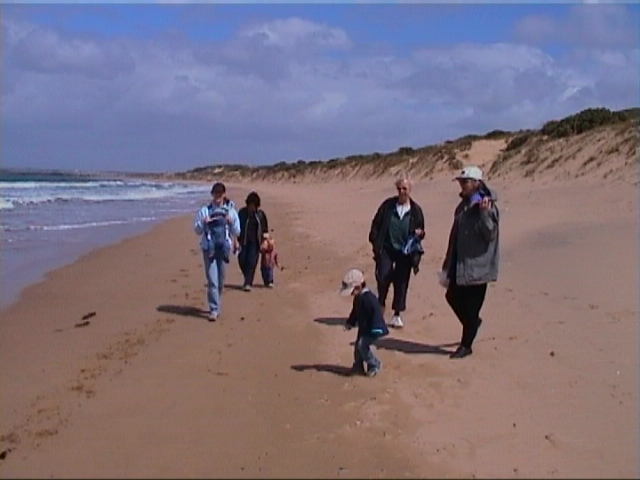
- Main beach at Breamlea

- Coordinates: 38°18′S 144°23′E
- Country: Australia
- State: Victoria
- LGAs: Surf Coast Shire; City of Greater Geelong
- Location: 93 km (58 mi) SW of Melbourne; 19 km (12 mi) S of Geelong; 11 km (6.8 mi) NE of Torquay

Government
  - State electorate: South Barwon
  - Federal division: Corangamite

Population
  - Total: 162 (2016 census)
- Postcode: 3227
Localities around Breamlea
Connewarre	Connewarre	Connewarre
Torquay	Breamlea	Bass Strait
Bass Strait	Bass Strait	Bass Strait

Breamlea is a locality in Surf Coast Shire, Victoria, Australia. It is located on the south coast of the Bellarine Peninsula, 18 kilometres south of Geelong, and halfway between Barwon Heads and Torquay. It is divided between the City of Greater Geelong and the Surf Coast Shire. In the 2016 census, Breamlea had a population of 162.

== Geography ==
Breamlea is nestled in the sand dunes between Thomsons Creek and the beach.

Thomsons Creek, also known as Bream Creek, runs through a natural network of reedy canals and widens before it enters Buckleys Bay. At the mouth of the creek is Point Impossible which is a well-known longboard surfing break.

The patrolled surf beach at Breamlea is called Bancoora, and is the closest surf beach to Melbourne. The beach was named after the SS Bancoora, that ran aground on the main beach in 1891. Other non-patrolled beaches along this stretch of coast are not heavily used.

== History ==
The area was once populated by the Mon Mart Clan of Wathaurong people. The rock shelves on the coast in the area have always been rich in shellfish, and large middens of discarded shells can be seen on the headland between Buckleys Bay and Stingray Bay. William Buckley lived in the area, and across the road from the caravan park is a well that he is supposed to have used.

The clipper ship Victoria Tower, on its maiden voyage to Melbourne, was wrecked on rocks at Point Impossible in 1869. It had been encountering problems with its compasses during its 85-day voyage to Australia. The wreck is one of many included in Victoria's Underwater Shipwreck Discovery Trail.

On 14 July 1891, the SS Bancoora ran aground on Breamlea Beach. The cargo included a young elephant, a rhinoceros, monkeys and parrots. All were landed safely and taken by lorry to Geelong, although the rhinoceros unfortunately only survived for two days. The Bancoora was re-floated by two steam tugs and assisted by them to the Alfred Graving Dock at Williamstown.

Thomsons Creek attracted campers and fishermen from the 1870s onwards and, by the 1920s, makeshift huts were being built by regular campers. During the Great Depression, squatters constructed more permanent buildings, rate-free, and eked out meals from the creek and the ocean.

The existence of the settlement, hitherto known as Bream Creek, was formally acknowledged by the government in October 1941 when it was proclaimed in the Government Gazette and renamed Breamlea, creating a small linear township huddled behind the high, Moonah-covered sand dunes. The proclamation paved the way for the sale of the first freehold land in 1942. A Post Office opened on 1 July 1947. Breamlea was only connected to the electricity grid in the late 1960s.

Breamlea State School opened in the local hall on 27 May 1952 and moved to a standalone site on 31 January 1955. It closed on 14 January 1966.

In 1962, a surf life saving club was formed at Bancoora Beach, with clubrooms being built in 1963. On 8 April 1987, the original clubhouse was gutted by fire. For the next four seasons the club operated from a tin shed, until the present building was opened on 25 October 1992.

== Township ==
Breamlea has around 100 houses nestled in the sand dunes between Thomsons Creek and the beach. The main street, Horwood Drive, is located at the base of the dunes, with Blyth Street above. Houses are located on the south side of Horwood Drive, and the north side of Blyth Street.

There is also a caravan park, and small general store with basic supplies. Halfway along Horwood Drive is a recreation reserve with an oval, children's playground, barbecue facilities and toilet.

The area is underdeveloped and many residents want to keep it that way. The architecture of Breamlea is a mix of fibro-cement beach shacks built in the 1950s and 1960s, and modern, architect-designed houses.

== Sewage outfall ==
Barwon Water's Black Rock sewage treatment plant is located to the north-east of Breamlea, processing effluent from Geelong and surrounding areas. Black Rock was chosen as the ocean outfall for Geelong's sewage in 1912, with the outfall sewer being built during the next three years. Initially, the sewage was left untreated before being discharged into the ocean, increasingly polluting several adjacent beaches. A basic comminutor was installed at the outlet in the 1970s but, in the 1980s, the treatment plant was built, along with a 1.2-kilometre-long ocean outfall. In 1997, the plant was further upgraded, with secondary filtration being provided, and a pipeline was installed to allow recycled water to be used on a flower farm at Torquay.

== Bancoora Surf Life Saving Club ==
The Bancoora Surf Life Saving Club (SLSC) conducts seasonal surf patrols over the summer period, and the beach has lifeguards on duty every day in January. Each summer, a nipper program is run to educate and enhance the surf skills of young members. Bancoora SLSC hosted the Australian Surf Lifesaving Championships during the Easter of 1977. Due to the heavy surf during the championships, many events were relocated to Fisherman's Beach in Torquay.

The club celebrated its fiftieth anniversary in 2013.

== Wind generator ==
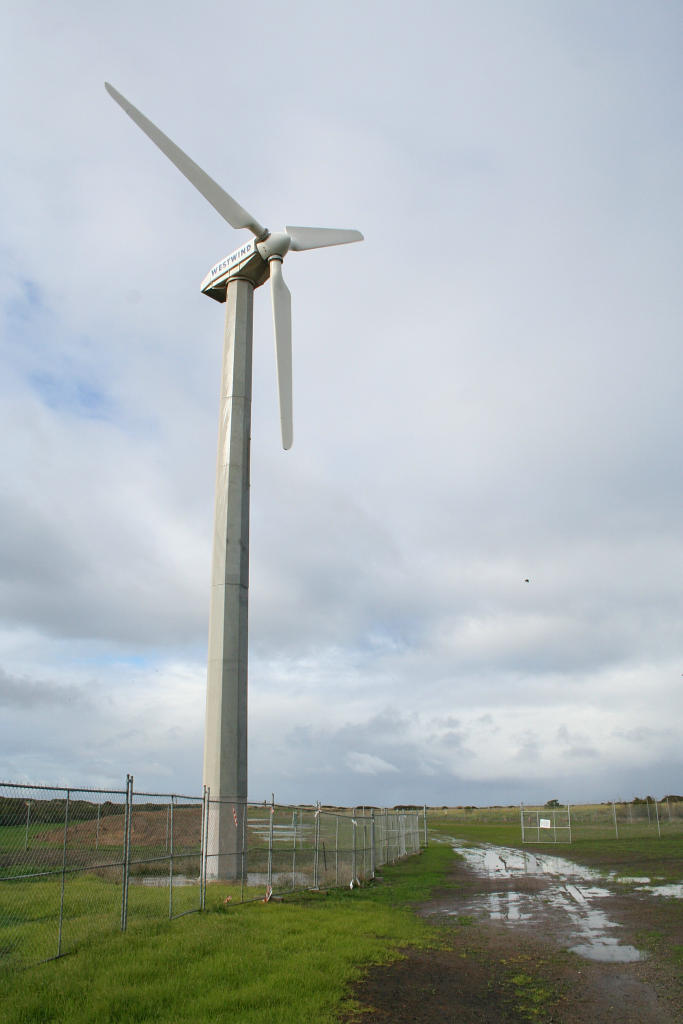
Wind generator at Breamlea in 2007

A wind generator, located on Black Rock Road, was erected in November 1987 by the State Electricity Commission of Victoria and the Victorian Solar Energy Council (now Energy Victoria), as a demonstration unit. The turbine, atop a 22-metre monopole, was of 60 kW capacity, and was manufactured by Westwind of Western Australia.

As a consequence of the privatisation of electricity supply in Victoria, the generator was sold in 1994 to the Alternative Technology Association of Melbourne. December 1995 saw it sold again, to Michael Gunter, a member of the previous organisation. Electricity production ceased at 1200hrs on 17 May 2003, due to an electrical generator burn-out, caused by moisture, salt, and electrical flash-over.

Local water utility, Barwon Water, bought the turbine the same year, restoring it to service in early 2004. It generates approximately 80,000 kWh per year for the grid, with an estimated 90-95 per cent availability, and produces between 7 kW and 10.3 kW of average power.
