= Limberlost (novel) =

2022 novel by Australian author Robbie Arnott

- Author: Robbie Arnott
- Audio read by: Zoe Carides
- Cover artist: W H Chong
- Language: English
- Genre: Literary fiction
- Publisher: Text Publishing
- Publication date: 5 October 2022
- Publication place: Australia
- Media type: Print, ebook, audiobook
- Pages: 240 pp.
- Awards: 2023 The Age Book of the Year
- ISBN: 9781922458766
- Preceded by: The Rain Heron
- Followed by: Dusk

Limberlost is a 2022 novel by the Australian author Robbie Arnott.

== Synopsis ==
Ned West is a young man living on his family's apple orchard, Limberlost, near a large river in the north of Tasmania. His father runs the property while his two older brothers are away at the Second World War. His sister, also older, lives there as well, and always in the background is the presence of his dead mother, dead so long that Ned has no memory of her. This novel tells the story of Ned as an adolescent, trapping and shooting rabbits over his summer school holidays to sell their pelts in order to raise money so he can buy a boat. And while Ned's work towards owning that boat is the story's main motive force it is really a story of his relationship to the land on which he lives, the animals, fish and whales which inhabit it, its other human occupants, and its indigenous history.

== Publishing history ==
After its initial publication in Australia by Text Publishing in 2022, it was reprinted as follows:

- 2022, UK, Atlantic Books

The novel was also translated into Norwegian and Italian in 2023.

== Dedication ==
- Dedication: "For my family."

== Critical reception ==
In the Australian Book Review Jennifer Mills wrote: "There is a vivid, sensory physicality in the texture of timber, apples, or pesticide spray on the skin, and a few of the grotesque infections that remind us of his characters’ vulnerability to rot. In an otherwise elegiac and plaintive novel, there are also colourful descriptions, like that of a man ‘made mostly of lint, capillaries and brandy vapour’, that artfully sketch whole characters and provide some levity...Limberlost is a book of difficult small choices: about what to care for, and what to hang on to, and what it's like to love things and people and animals and places you are powerless to save. Even as it looks back over the twentieth century, there is an Anthropocene tilt to this book's sense of a world slipping away, its appreciation of human inadequacy."

Jen Webb, writing for The Conversation noted the novel receiving enthusiastic response: "Its writing is alert to the language and imagery of mythology, and attuned to the living world. As such, Limberlost fits neatly within the rubric of eco-fiction: literature in which the natural world plays a major role, and where the associations and dependencies between human and natural worlds take centre stage."

== Awards ==
Year	Award	Category	Result	Ref
2023	The Age Book of the Year	Fiction	Won	
2023	Australian Book Industry Awards	Literary Fiction	Shortlisted	
2023	ALS Gold Medal	—	Shortlisted	
2023	Dylan Thomas Prize	—	Shortlisted	
2023	Indie Book Awards	Fiction	Shortlisted	
2023	Miles Franklin Award	—	Shortlisted	
2023	Victorian Premier's Literary Awards	Fiction	Highly commended	
2025	Tasmanian Literary Awards	Fiction	Shortlisted	

== See also ==
- 2022 in Australian literature
- Tasmanian apples
