= Anne Kellas =

Australian poet, reviewer and editor

Anne Kellas is an Australian poet, reviewer and editor, who was born in South Africa and emigrated to Australia in 1986.

== Poetry life ==
Anne Kellas was born in South Africa, in Germiston in 1951 in what was then the Transvaal, now Gauteng, and emigrated to Australia in 1986. Her earliest work appeared in 1968 but she began writing seriously in 1975 when she joined a group of writers associated with Lionel Abrahams who at one stage called themselves the Circle of Eight. This group gathered around Lionel Abrahams had included at various times the writers Anne Schuster, the Beat poet Sinclair Beilis, Basil Du Toit, Debbie Aarons, novelist, critic and editor Ivan Vladislavic, academic and publisher Shirley Pendlebury, Michael Gardiner, Francis Faller, and others. An earlier incarnation of this group had included Robert and Eva Royston, who later moved to the UK.

Anne Kellas's first book of poetry, Poems from Mt Moono, was published by Shirley Pendlebury's Hippogriff Press in 1989. By this time Kellas and her husband, the journalist/photographer/writer Giles Hugo had already emigrated to Australia. In Tasmania she served for many years as poetry editor for the small magazine Famous Reporter and from circa 2003 was web content editor for Island (formerly Island magazine).

Her second collection, Isolated States, received funding from Tasmania's arts funding body in 1993 and was published by Australian poet/publisher Tim Thorne. Thorne's Cornford Press was active until 2004 in publishing poets on the political left and/or non-mainstream poets, such as Liz Winfield and the late Selwyn Hughes, Jenny Boult/Magenta Bliss and many others.

Her third collection, The White Room Poems, received funding from the Australia Council and was published in 2015 by Walleah Press. The Netted Air, a collection in the Picaro Poets series from Ginninderra Press, followed in 2018.

In 1995 Anne Kellas and Giles Hugo had set up one of the first Australian online magazines, The Write Stuff, which they jointly edited. Among its other content, such as book reviews and interviews with writers, their web site documented the vivid poetry landscape of Tasmania, with an online Showcase of Tasmanian poetry holding vignettes of over 40 Tasmanian poets. The site was archived through the National Library of Australia's Pandora Archive. In 2006 after the tragic death of the editors' younger son, the site, which included the "Showcase of Tasmanian Poets" was formally closed.

In 2004 Kellas had established Roaring Forties Press, a small literary press which, though based in Tasmania, Australia, published the posthumous collection of poetry by Lionel Abrahams, Chaos Theory of the Heart, produced in conjunction with Jacana Media in Johannesburg. They also published the Australian short story-writer Geoffrey Dean's seventh collection, The Literary Lunch. As with The Write Stuff, this press was closed after the death of Anne's younger son.

In 2017, her third collection, The White Room Poems, was shortlisted for the Margaret Scott Prize as part of the Tasmanian Premier's Literary awards. The collection also received one of two $10,000 awards from the small press Blue Giraffe. (States of Poetry series 2, poetry by Anne Kellas, in the Australian Book Review, 2018.)

The Australian composer Scott McIntyre is currently setting The White Room Poems to music. Some of Kellas' earlier poems have been set to music and recorded by Australian composer Matthew Dewey (Isolated States, a song cycle based on the poetry of Anne Kellas)

Ways to Say Goodbye was shortlisted for the Tim Thorne Poetry at the 2025 Tasmanian Literary Awards.

== Personal life ==
Kellas is married to the photographer Giles Hugo and has two children (one of whom died at the age of 21) and three grandchildren. She studied at the University of the Witwatersrand where she obtained a Bachelor of Arts in English and German, and a higher diploma in education. She also studied at the University of Cape Town where she obtained a higher diploma in librarianship. She worked in libraries, mostly at the Australian Clearinghouse for Youth Studies (ACYS) where she was information manager for many years (until 2009). She participated in a national youth roundtable convened by then Prime Minister Kevin Rudd in order to establish a national youth policy for Australia in late 2009. After leaving ACYS to write full-time, she then embarked on a master's degree by research in 2014 at the University of Tasmania and was awarded her M.Ed. in 2017.

== Books ==
- Poems from Mt. Moono (Johannesburg, Hippogriff Press, 1989) ISBN 978-0620140119
- Isolated States (Launceston Tasmania, Cornford Press, 2001) ISBN 978-0957756564
- The White Room Poems (Hobart, Tasmania, Walleah Press, 2015) ISBN 978-1877010224
- The Netted Air (Port Adelaide, South Australia, Picaro Press, 2018) ISBN 978-1760414931
- Ways to Say Goodbye (Seddon, Victoria, Liquid Amber Press, 2023) ISBN 978-0-6457130-1-5

== Anthologies ==
- A writer in Stone (Cape Town, 1998); ISBN 978-0864864284
- Like a house on Fire: Contemporary Women's Writing, Art, and Photography From South Africa (Johannesburg, COSAW 1986); ISBN 978-1874879268
- Moorilla Mosaic (Hobart, Bumblebee Books, 2000);
- River of Verse: a Tasmanian Journey 1800 - 2004 (Hobart, Back River Press, 2005); ISBN 978-0646441825
- This vision thing Melbourne Poets Union anthology, 2004; ISBN 978-0-9580576-2-2
- Dodecahedron Poets Union anthology (Sydney). 2010; ISBN 978-0-9804323-1-2
- Metabolism Australian Poetry's members anthology, 2012; ISBN 978-0-9871-7650-9
- To end all wars Puncher and Wattmann, 2018; ISBN 978-1-92578-027-7
- Mountain secrets Ginninderra Press, 2019; ISBN 978-1-76041-800-7
- The sky falls down: An anthology of loss Ginninderra Press, 2019; ISBN 978-1-76041-730-7
