= Gumm =

Gumm is a surname. Notable people with the surname include:

- Frances Gumm (1922–1969), better known as Judy Garland, American actress, singer, and vaudevillian
- James Gumm, Australian explorer
- Jay Paul Gumm (born 1963), American politician
