= Bancoora Beach =

Beach in Breamlea, Victoria, Australia

Bancoora Beach Breamlea Surf Beach
- Beach
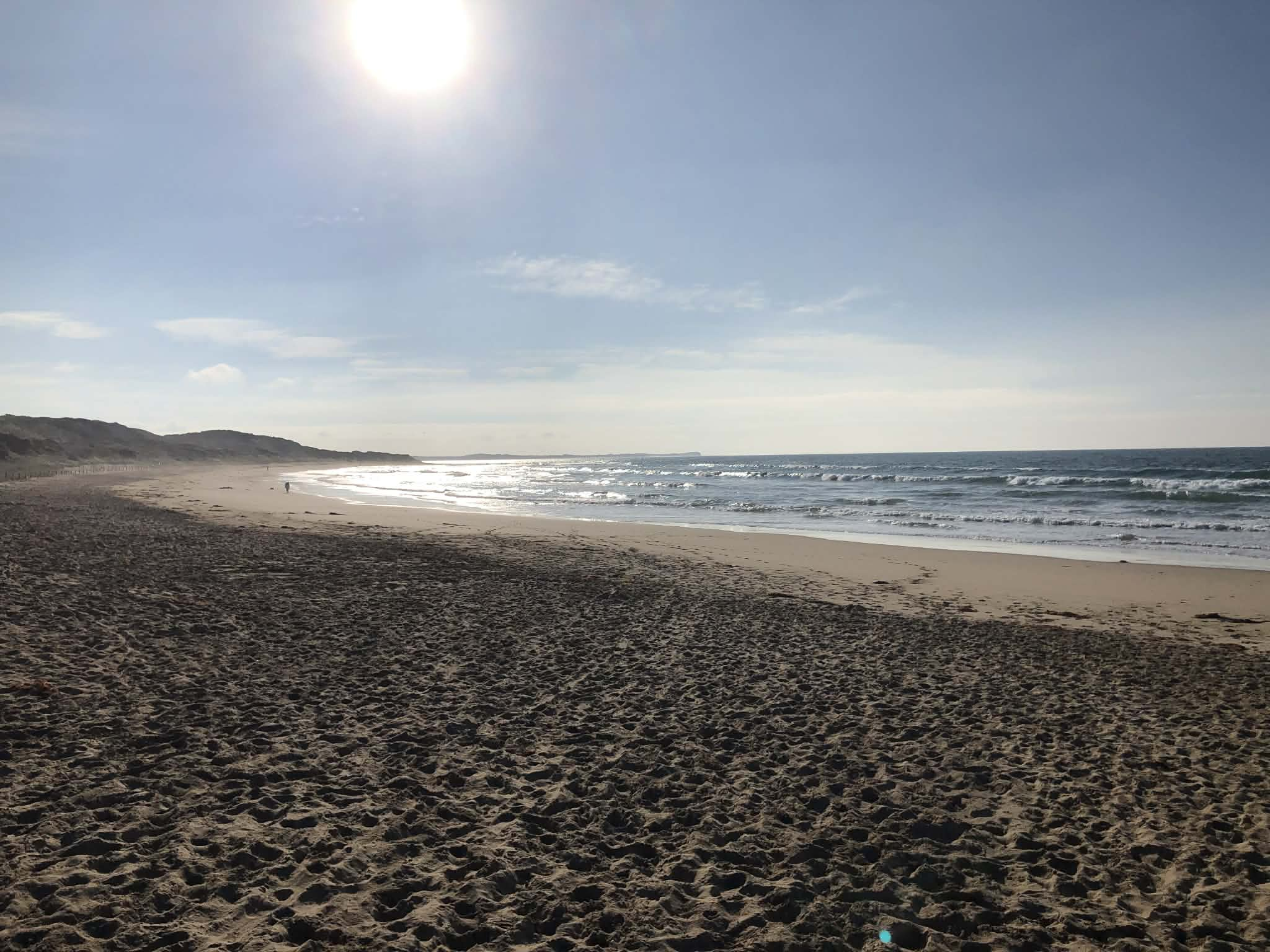
- Bancoora Beach
- Interactive map of Bancoora Beach
- Coordinates: 38°17′30″S 144°24′22″E
- Location: Breamlea, Victoria, Australia
- Water bodies: Bass Strait

Dimensions
  - Length: 1 kilometre (0.62 mi)
- Patrolled by: SLSA
- Hazard rating: 5/10 (moderately hazardous)
- Access: Surf Club Lane

Bancoora Beach is a patrolled coastal beach facing the Bass Strait in Breamlea, Victoria, Australia. The beach, named after the SS Bancoora which ran aground on the adjacent Breamlea Beach in 1891, is a popular destination for holidaymakers in the summer, owing to the nearby caravan park, as well as the low-to-moderate surf conditions. The beach area is Public land managed by the City of Greater Geelong.

== History ==
Several middens containing a variety of shellfish have been found in the dunes, left by the Wathaurong Aboriginal people.

By the early 1900s, Breamlea became a popular camping area for holidaymakers, arriving from Geelong and surrounds.

The Bancoora Surf Life Saving Club was formed in 1962, and clubrooms were built in 1963.

In 1977 the Australian Surf Life Saving Championships was held at Bancoora Beach, but due to very rough surf, the swimming events were moved to Fishermans Beach, Torquay.

== Geography and features ==
The beach stretches for 1 kilometre, facing south-east. Either end of the beach is marked by basaltic points. Waves are, on average, 1.3 metres, and typically create three rips across the sandbar, which is 80 metres wide. Permanent rips exist against the rocks at the ends of the beach. The southern point, in times of high surf, can create a right-hand point beak. 10 people are rescued each year, on average.

Fishing is a popular pastime here, particularly in the rip holes and at the rocky points.

The beach is surrounded by vegetated dunes, the vegetation largely consisting of spinifex grass and moonah trees. The beach also sees birds such as the red-capped plover and the hooded plover, the latter being endangered. Other birds include the migratory double-banded plover from New Zealand and the ruddy turnstone from Russia. A lookout sits on top of the dunes, which overlooks the beach.

== Access ==
Access to the beach is via Surf Club Lane, which reaches Brealmea Road, the main thoroughfare in and out of the township. The car park is offset behind the beach, with a small sandy track leading to the beach, also used by emergency vehicles.

== See also ==
- Thirteenth Beach
- Torquay Surf Beach
- Torquay Front Beach
- Jan Juc Beach
- Great Ocean Road
