= To Name Those Lost =

2014 novel by Australian author Rohan Wilson

- Author: Rohan Wilson
- Language: English
- Genre: Literary novel
- Publisher: Allen and Unwin
- Publication date: 2014
- Publication place: Australia
- Media type: Print
- Pages: 297 pp.
- Awards: 2015 Victorian Premier's Prize for Fiction, winner
- ISBN: 9781743318324
- Preceded by: The Roving Party

To Name Those Lost is a 2014 novel by the Australian author Rohan Wilson.

The novel is a sequel to the author's 2011 novel The Roving Party.

It was the winner of the 2015 Victorian Premier's Prize for Fiction.

== Synopsis ==
The novel is set in Tasmania in 1874, forty-five years after the events depicted in The Roving Party. Thomas Toosey is now sixty-years-old and has decided to give up his old life and search for his motherless 12-year-old son in Launceston.

== Critical reception ==
In The Saturday Paper the reviewer JF described the novel as "There is a justice in Wilson's resolution of this dark and vigorous tale; though the ex-convicts don't escape the fatal shore, there is redemption for the next generation. Wilson's superbly taut novel keeps up its pace with spare punctuation and brutal dialogue in a vigorously drawn landscape feverish with the heat of a bushfire summer."

David Whish-Wilson, writing in Australian Book Review noted that "Wilson's characters are not ciphers standing in for [...] broader social forces and themes. All of them are fully humanised, their motives and hopes and frailties convincingly explored," and goes on conclude "There is a purity of vision in To Name Those Lost's consistency of tone and relentless drive to capture the dark poetry of dangerous times."

== Publication history ==
After the novel's initial publication in Australia by Allen and Unwin it was reprinted in the USA in 2017 by Europa Editions.

== Awards ==
- 2015 Victorian Premier's Prize for Fiction, winner
- 2015 Prime Minister's Literary Award, shortlisted
- 2015 Voss Literary Prize, shortlisted

== See also ==
- 2014 in Australian literature
