= William Buckley (convict) =

English convict

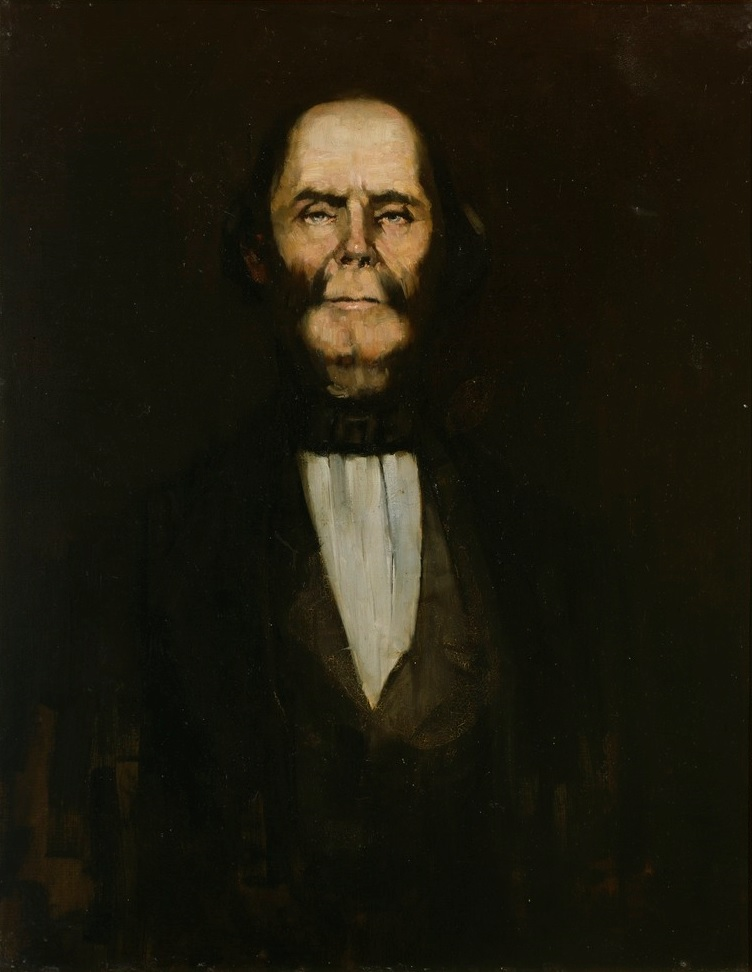
- William Buckley, State Library Victoria, H30879
- Born: 1776–1780; Marton, Cheshire, near Macclesfield, Cheshire, England
- Died: 30 January 1856 (aged 75–76); Hobart, Tasmania, Australia
- Occupations: bricklayer, soldier, Indigenous culture recorder, public servant
- Known for: "Wild white man" who lived with the Aboriginal Wallarranga tribe of the Wathaurong nation for 32 years
- Spouse(s): Julia Eager, then Julia Higgins when she and her husband came to Australia

William Buckley (born 1776–1780 – died 30 January 1856), also known as the "wild white man", was an English bricklayer, and served in the military until 1802, when he was convicted of theft. He was then transported to Australia, where he helped construct buildings for the fledgling penal settlement at Port Phillip Bay in what is now Victoria, Australia.

He escaped the settlement in 1803, and was given up for dead, while he lived among the Indigenous Wallarranga tribe of the Wathaurong nation for 32 years. In 1835, he was pardoned and became an Indigenous culture recorder. From 1837 to 1850 he was a public servant in Tasmania.

== Early life ==
William Buckley was born in 1776 or 1780 in the village of Marton in the Macclesfield area of Cheshire, England. (Note: Marton is 8 miles (13 km) from the town of Macclesfield.) His father was a farmer.

As a child, he was adopted by his mother's father, who lived in Macclesfield. His grandfather paid for his schooling, and at the age of 15 Buckley became an apprentice bricklayer working under Robert Wyatt. After his adoption, he was separated from his parents, two sisters, and a brother.

Buckley grew to the approximate (Note: Descriptions of the adult Buckley vary. According John Helder Wedge, who met him in 1835, 'with his long, matted hair, he was a most awfully savage-looking fellow, standing 6 feet 5 7/8 inches (197.8 cm) in height without shoes, erect in person, and well proportioned'. When Buckley appeared at their camp, Englishman James Gumm out of curiosity measured him as 6 feet 7 inches (201 cm) or 6 feet 8 inches (203 cm). Buckley himself records his height as being 6 feet 5 inches (196 cm). John Pascoe Fawkner, who was also at Sullivan Bay when he was 11 years old, states that Buckley's height was 6 feet 4 1/2 inches (194.3 cm). According to George Russell who met him near the Yarra River in 1836, Buckley stood 6 feet 4 inches (193 cm) tall, but numerous other heights are reported, ranging from 6 feet 3 inches (191 cm) to 6 feet 7 inches (201 cm).) height of 6 feet 6 inches (198 cm), which was very unusual for the time. According to an acquaintance George Russell, Buckley "was a tall, ungainly man ... and altogether his looks were not in his favour; he had a bushy head of black hair, a low forehead with overhanging eyebrows nearly concealing his small eyes, a short snub nose, a face very much marked by smallpox, and was just such a man as one would suppose fit to commit burglary or murder." That general description was echoed by other reports of the day, although not always as flattering. He was generally represented as being of low intelligence, but biographer Marjorie J. Tipping stated that "according to his easy assimilation into an unfamiliar way of life may also suggest that he was intelligent, shrewd and courageous".

At about 19, Buckley enlisted in the Cheshire Militia, beginning a four-year military career. He was later at the 4th (King's Own) Regiment of Foot. Because of his height, he was given the role of pivot man for the regiment. He had a good reputation with the officers. In 1799, his regiment went to The Netherlands to fight against Napoleon, under the command of the Duke of York. Buckley was severely wounded in his right hand.

The corps then was stationed at Chatham, where Buckley became restless and associated with several soldiers of bad character. (Note: According to the Hobart Town Almanack and Van Diemen’s Land Annual, he was among of group of mutineers from Gibraltar intent on shooting the Duke of Kent, but there is no corroboration of his involvement in that event.) According to Buckley, he was asked by a woman to carry a roll of cloth to the garrison where his regiment was stationed, not knowing that the fabric was stolen. Buckley was convicted on 2 August 1802 at the Sussex Assizes of knowingly receiving a roll of stolen cloth. He was sentenced to transportation to New South Wales for fourteen years or life. Due to the manner in which the military was prosecuted at the time, he was unaware of his final sentence. After his conviction, he neither saw nor heard from his family again.

== Transportation and escape from his wife ==
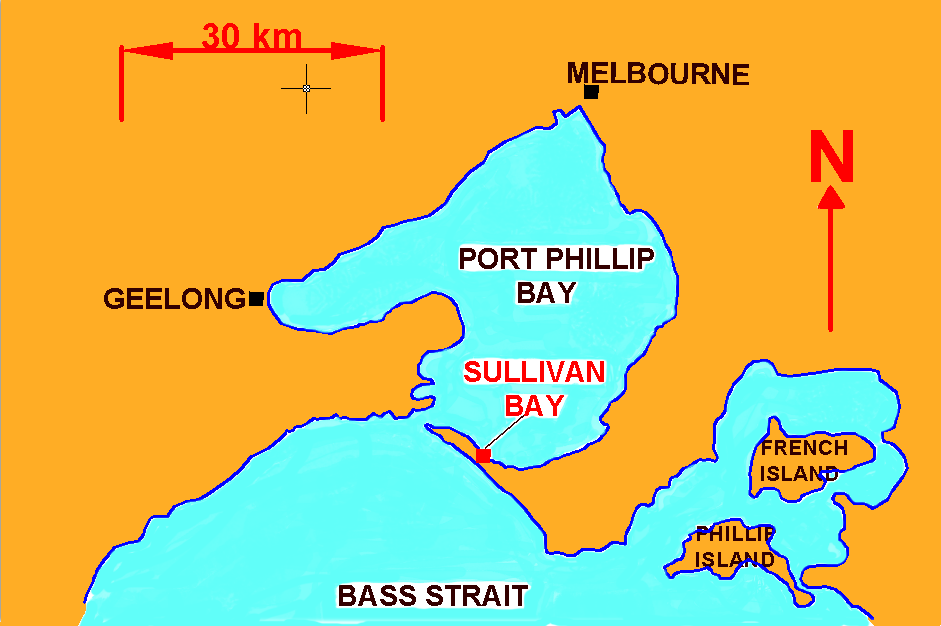
Sullivan Bay, Victoria where passengers of Calcutta landed in 1803. He later lived predominantly on Bellarine Peninsula over 32 years.

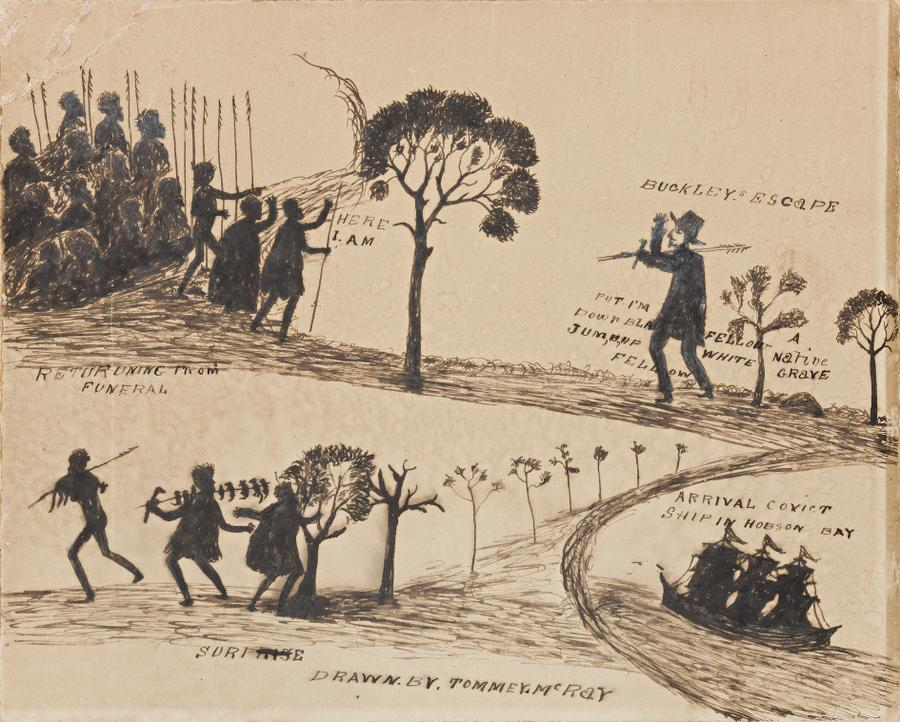
Buckley's transportation and escape as depicted by 19th-century Aboriginal artist Tommy McRae

Buckley left England in April 1803 aboard HMS Calcutta, one of two ships sent to Port Phillip to form a new settlement under Lieutenant-Colonel David Collins. (Note: Penal colonies of English convicts were established in Australia beginning in 1788. At the time, the Port Phillip Bay area was part of New South Wales.) They arrived at the eastern side of Port Phillip Bay in October 1803 and landed at one of its small bays, Sullivan Bay near what is now Sorrento. Royal Marines and labourers encamped together. Skilled labourers, including Buckley, lived in huts nearer building sites. The skilled labourers were given a degree of freedom because there was more than 600 miles (1,000 km) of wilderness to the nearest settlement at Sydney, which made escape treacherous.

The new settlement lacked fresh water and arable soil, and a decision was made a couple of months later (Note: McHugh said the decision was made a few weeks later, but they arrived in October and did not abandon the site until after December 1803. For more information, see Sullivan Bay, Victoria § History.) to abandon the site and move to Van Diemen's Land (Tasmania). Buckley and five others escaped during a rain storm on 27 December 1803, to avoid being sent to Tasmania, hoping to escape to Port Jackson (Sydney). Of the six, Charles Shaw was shot by a soldier and was captured with another convict. Daniel Allender surrendered to Lieutenant Governor David Collins on 16 January 1804. The three remaining men subsisted on rations of food that they brought with them as well as seafood and berries that they collected, but they struggled to find enough food and fresh water. After travelling along the coast of Port Phillip Bay to what is now Melbourne and across the plains to the Yawang Hills (today known as the You Yangs), the men finished the last of their rations. They realised that to survive they needed to return to the bay for food. They doubled back to the west side of the bay to what is now Corio, Victoria and then to Swan Island. Along the way, they avoided huts of Indigenous people. The men attempted to signal a ship anchored in Port Phillip Bay without success for a week. (Note: Buckley stated that the ship was the Calcutta, but it had left the area in mid-December, before they had escaped. The ship was likely the Ocean. The Calcutta and Ocean made up the first fleet of Victoria.) His two fellow travellers decided to walk back to the eastern edge of Port Phillips Bay (Sullivan Bay). Buckley decided to try his luck on his own.

Over the next several days, Buckley became increasingly ill due to dehydration, starvation, and painful sores from poor nutrition. Buckley was near death when he arrived at Aireys Inlet where he found embers from an earlier fire, fresh water, seafood, and a cave for shelter. He stayed awhile to build back his strength and then he followed the Victorian coast south to a spot near a stream where he established a hut for himself of tree branches and seaweed. He foraged for plants, berries, and seafood to sustain himself.

== Life with the Wathaurong people ==
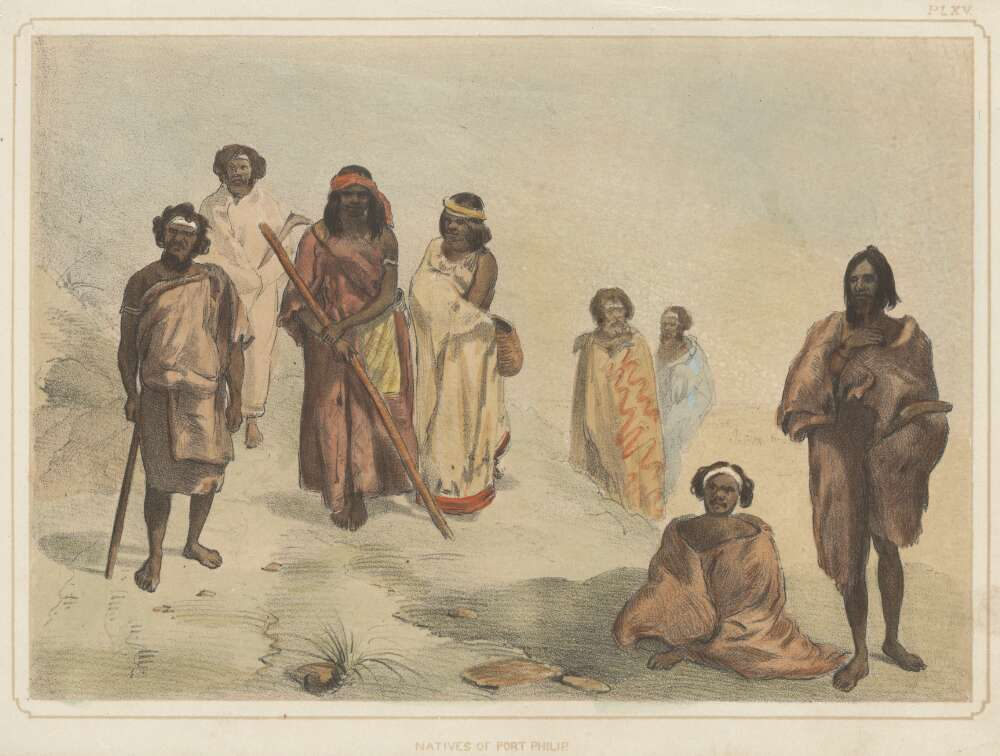
Aboriginal Australians of Port Phillip, Victoria

Buckley met three spear-carrying Wathaurong people, who befriended him at a place called Nooraki (Mount Defiance Lookout, Wye River, Great Ocean Road). His visitors made him a meal of crayfish. They then asked Buckley to follow him to their huts, where they arrived by nightfall. In the morning the trio went on further into the woods, but Buckley communicated that he would remain in the area.

He returned to his hut along the creek on the western side of Port Phillip Bay. Winter was approaching and he was finding it increasingly difficult to collect adequate amounts of food and keep warm. Lonely and worn-down, he journeyed to the eastern portion of the bay in the hope that there were some English escapees who remained in the area. On his journey, he found a burial mound with a spear sticking out of the ground. He took it and used it as a walking stick. Further on his trek, he stumbled while crossing a stream and he was carried away by the current. He managed to get to the shore but was too exhausted to walk. The next morning, still quite feeble, he walked to a lake or lagoon known as Maamart by the Indigenous people. There he met two women who realised that he needed help, and with assistance of their husbands, they led Buckley to their huts. The people were members of the Wallarranga tribe of the Wathaurong nation. They believed him to be the spirit of a deceased tribal chief, whose spear he had taken from the burial mound. Buckley was given the name Murrangurk, which McHugh says was the chief's name. Tim Flannery states that Muuranong guurk means "one who has been killed and brought back to life again".

For the next several days, there were ceremonies of mourning and rejoicing. He was cared for and given food specifically selected and prepared to strengthen him. Buckley was taken in by the former chief's brother, sister-in-law, and nephew. He was adopted into the tribe about one year after he had escaped. The Wallarranga tribe shared their food with him and taught him their language, customs, and bush skills. He learnt to catch fish and eels, cook in their manner, skin possums and kangaroo, and make thread from animal sinew. The tribe appeared to hunt and gather sufficient food. They had little illness and lived long lives. During the evenings, Buckley often shared his campfire with tribal members and told stories of life in England, on ships, and at war.

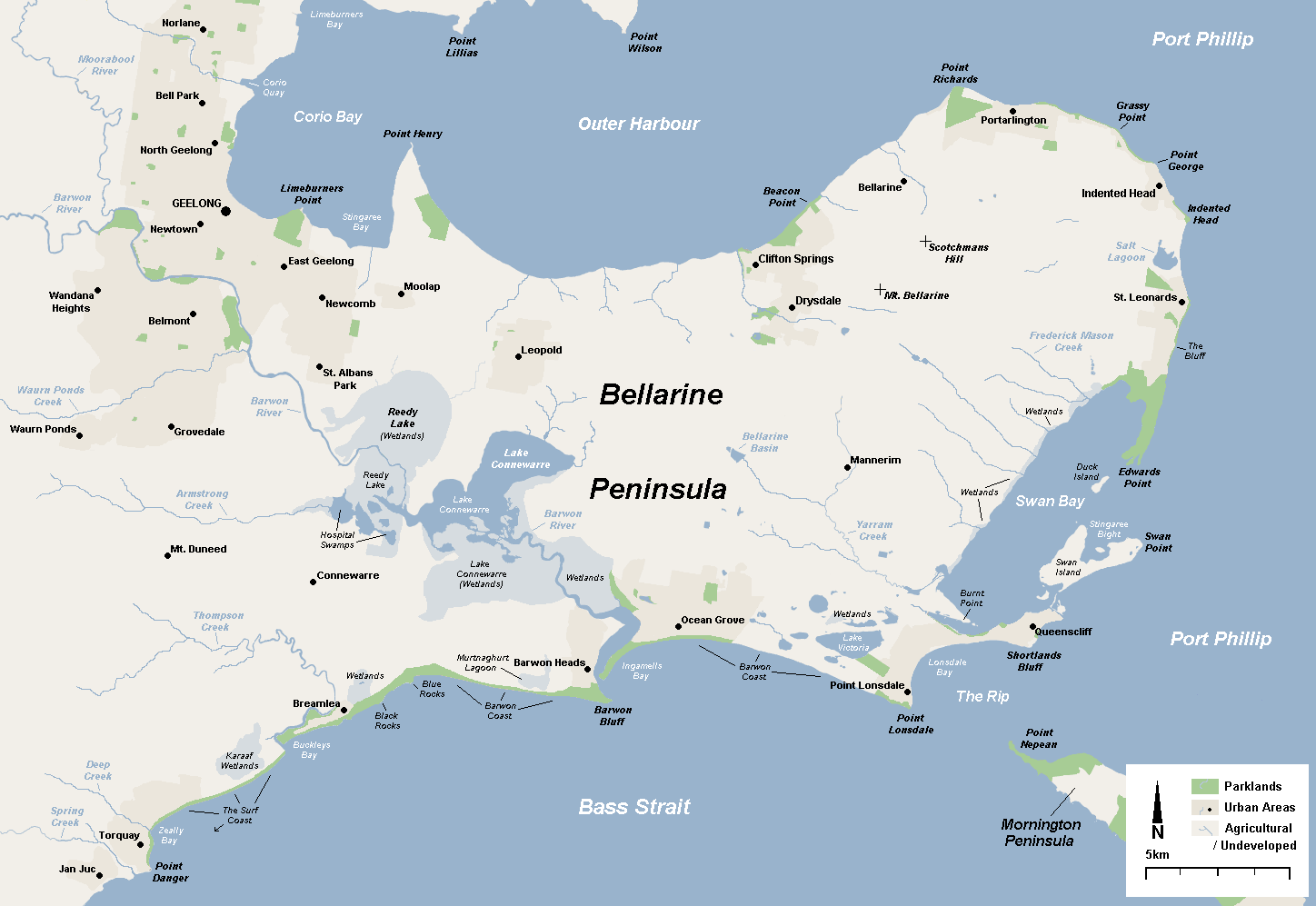
Bellarine Peninsula map. Breamlea and the Barwon area is on southwest coast of the peninsula

For thirty-two years, Buckley lived among the Wallarranga tribe of the Wathaurong nation on the Bellarine Peninsula of southern Victoria. He lived primarily near the mouth of Bream Creek, now known as Thompsons Creek, near present-day Breamlea and he also lived 2 kilometres (1.2 miles) east at the mouth of the Barwon River. (Note: Barwon River is spelled Barwin River in Flannery.) Living on the western side of the bay, he had access to fresh water, yam daisy (murnong), bream, seafood, and birds. His diet was supplemented with game—including kangaroo, wombat, koala, wallaby and turkey—that he hunted on the basalt plains. There were several shipwrecks along the coast in which no one survived. Buckley and other tribal members collected tools, blankets, and other items.

When Buckley showed himself to be a successful hunter, fisherman, and forager who provided for himself and the tribe, he was given a wife, with whom he had a daughter. (Note: According to Dawson, he had no children.) A Buninyong woman, Purranmurnin Tallarwurnin, was 15 years old when she met Buckley and became his wife and she may have been the mother of his daughter. By 1881, she lived in Victoria's Western District at the Framlingham Mission. (Note: In 1881, Purranmurnin Tallarwurnin gave an account of her life to the superintendent of the mission station. There are varying accounts with limited detail about Buckley's relationship with women over the three decades. According to George Langhorne, Buckley stated that he never lived with a native woman, but he also stated at some point that he had a daughter with a native woman.) He is also said to have been given a wife when he was single, but there was jealousy among some of the tribesmen and he was once again single.

External image
- Sketch of long-haired William Buckley with weapons and a cloak

He was treated with great affection and respect. "By virtue of his age and peaceful ways, Buckley ... became a Ngurungaeta, a person of considerable respect among his people and his voice was influential in deciding matters of war and peace." Buckley became an expert with Aboriginal weapons, though despite this, as a revered spirit, he was banned from participating in tribal wars. During one battle, the family who had taken him in and many other members of the clan were killed. Buckley then decided to live by himself, first along the Bass Strait coast and then along Bream Creek. He leveraged all that he had been taught about foraging for food, and then he figured out how to catch fish in greater number using a weir. He also began to dehydrate and preserve food. Members of the clan he had previously lived with joined him there. Over time, he forgot the English language and his hair grew very long.

Buckley had periods of time where he lived as a hermit, but he had become accustomed to his life among the Wallarranga tribe. For many years, he avoided meeting Europeans who visited or settled in the area. An escaped convict, he was afraid what would happen to him if he turned himself over to the Englishmen.

== Pardon ==
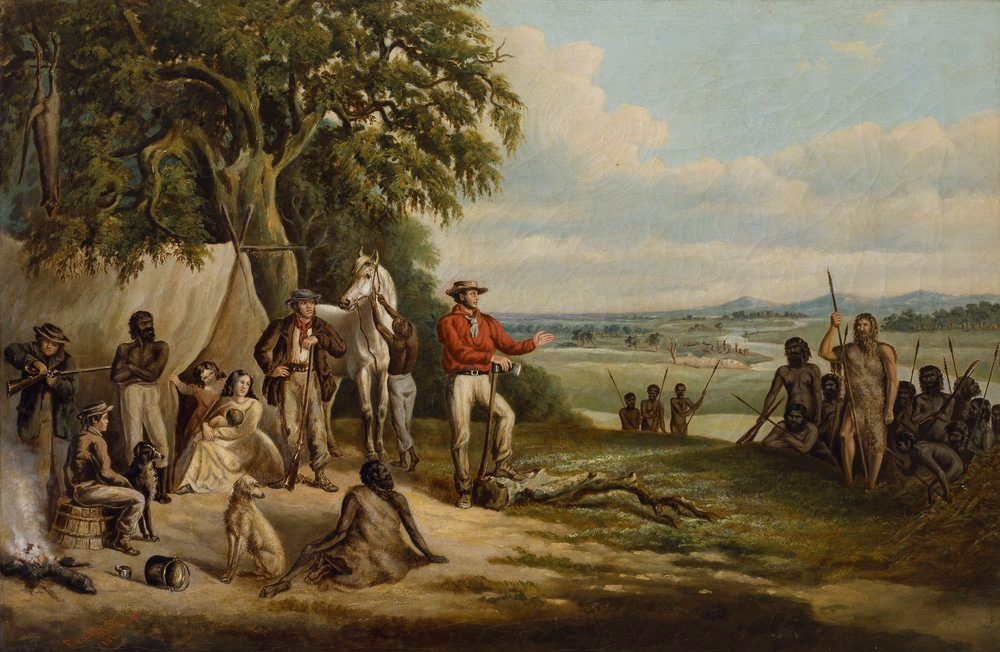
Frederick William Woodhouse, The first settlers discover Buckley, 1861, H26103 State Library Victoria

In July 1835, a ship arrived at Indented Head and Buckley learnt that some of the Aboriginal people intended to murder the English passengers and rob the ship. On 6 July 1835, William Buckley and a party of Indigenous people appeared at the camp site of John Batman's Port Phillip Association, led by John Wedge.

He wore kangaroo skins, carried Aboriginal weapons, and wore a tattoo with the initials 'W.B.' and tattoo marks. William Todd recalled in his journal entry for 6 July 1835:

About 2 o'C. a White Man came walking up to the Native huts, a most surprising hight [sic], Clad the same as the Natives. He seemed highly pleased to see us. We brought him a piece of bread, which he eat very heartily, & told us immedeatily [sic] what it was. He also informes us that he has been above 20 years in the Country, during which time he has been with the Natives....He then told us his name was William Buckley....being so long with the natives he has nearly forgot the English language – but the native languages he can speak fluently.

The tattoo of initials proved he was the convict William Buckley, who had been given up for dead three decades ago. Legally, he was still a convict and could be imprisoned again. Buckley had not used the English language for many years and had forgotten how to speak English, but it returned to him over time. Although still intent on raiding the Englishmen, Buckley convinced the Indigenous people not to attack the Englishmen, and he promised to reward them if they remained peaceful. Wedge obtained a pardon for Buckley through Lieutenant-Governor George Arthur.

== Return to Western culture ==
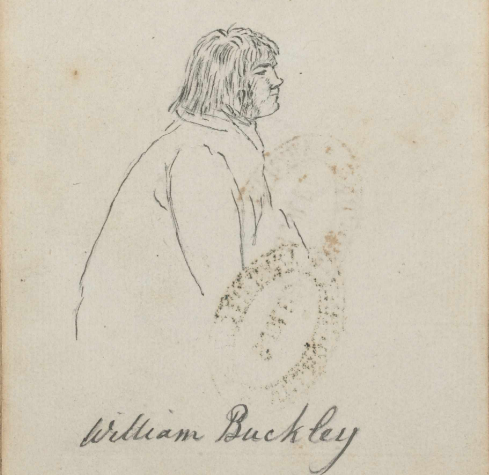
Sketch of William Buckley by John Helder Wedge

Buckley was employed by John Batman to be an interpreter and help build his house in Melbourne. He was then an Indigenous language interpreter for the government.

On 4 February 1836, William Buckley accompanied Joseph Gellibrand and his party, which included William Robertson, one of the financiers of the Port Phillip Association, on a trip west from Melbourne, heading toward Geelong, where they met with a group of Wathaurong people with whom Buckley had lived. From Gellibrand's diary:

February 5th, 1836: I directed Buckley to advance and we would follow him at a distance of a quarter of a mile. Buckley made towards a native well and after he had rode about 8 miles, we heard a cooey and when we arrived at the spot I witnessed one of the most pleasing and affecting sights. There were three men five women and about twelve children. Buckley had dismounted and they were all clinging around him and tears of joy and delight running down their cheeks.... It was truly an affecting sight and proved the affection which these people entertained for Buckley ... amongst the number were a little old man and an old woman, one of his wives. Buckley told me this was his old friend with whom he had lived and associated thirty years.

By this time, Buckley was wearing clothes of the Englishmen. As he prepared to leave the gathering, his friends were disheartened to realise that he would not be living with them again.

During the course of his career as an interpreter and mediator, he tried to manage his role working for the government while also being concerned about equitable treatment of Aboriginal people. He felt that Indigenous people and influential white men were suspicious of him and he decided to move to Van Diemen's Land. In December 1837, he left Port Phillip and on 10 January 1838 he arrived in Hobart in what was then known as Van Diemen's Land (Tasmania). He worked at the Immigrants' Home as assistant storekeeper. Four years later, (Note: Pyke states that Buckley received the position of gatekeeper a few months later.) he worked at the Female Factory as a gatekeeper.

On 27 June 1840, he was married to Julia Higgins, at St John's Church, New Town, Hobart, by the Reverend T. J. Ewing. According to a contemporary, George Russell, she is said to have been as short as he was tall—so much so that when out walking she was too short to even reach his arm. To remedy this problem he would tie two corners of his handkerchief together, and after fastening this to his arm, she would put her arm through the loop. Julia was the 26 year-old widow of Daniel Higgins (he changed his surname from Eagers to Higgins upon coming to Australia), who allegedly had been murdered by Aboriginal people while en route overland from Sydney to Port Phillip in 1839. He had met the Higgins family, Daniel, Julia, and their daughter when he worked at the Immigrant's Home. After Daniel's death, Buckley asked his widow to marry him.

Buckley lived in the Arthur Circus neighbourhood of Battery Point, Hobart. He retired in 1850. Buckley was seriously injured after he was thrown from his gig at Greenpond near Hobart. He died of his injuries on 30 January 1856 at the age of 76. Buckley was interred at the burial ground of St George's Anglican Church, Battery Point.

After his death, his widow Julia moved north to live with her daughter and son-in-law, William Jackson, and their family. Eventually they moved to Sydney. She died there at the Hyde Park Asylum on 18 August 1863.

== Legacy ==
A plaque commemorates him at Buckley's Rest, a small park in Sandy Bay, Hobart.

Buckley's Falls near Woorongo was named after Buckley by John Helder Wedge.

A pedestrian bridge connecting Barwon Heads and Ocean Grove was built parallel to the existing road bridge, and opened in 2011. It is named after William Buckley.

== John Morgan's The Life and Adventures of William Buckley as history ==
Almost all knowledge of Buckley's life with the Wathaurung people is based on the 1852 account written by John Morgan (1792–1866), Life and Adventures of William Buckley. Written when the illiterate Buckley was 72 years old, it was clearly intended to make money for the insolvent Morgan and Buckley. As a result, the account has sometimes been dismissed as more the product of Morgan's fertile imagination than a true representation of Buckley's experiences. Its references to the mythical Bunyip and tribe of copper-coloured, pot-bellied "Pallidurgbarrans" who supposedly lived in the Otway forests are often cited as evidence of this. However, while acknowledging its limitations, some scholars, such as Lester Hiatt, see it as consistent with "modern understandings of Aboriginal social life". Tim Flannery suggests that Buckley's story has been "ignored or mentioned only in passing by historians" because it is "so at odds with contemporary preconceptions". Another factor, he suggests, is that "studies of Aboriginal Victoria have long relied heavily on archaeological research". Flannery cites Edward Curr, an early author of Aboriginal studies, who claimed Morgan's book gave "a truer account of Aboriginal life than any work I have read".

== "You've got Buckley's chance" ==
Buckley's improbable survival is believed by many Australians to be the source of the vernacular phrase, "you've got Buckley's or none" (or simply "you've got Buckley's"), which means "no chance", or "it's as good as impossible". The Macquarie Dictionary supports this theory.

The Australian National Dictionary Centre deprecates a second theory: that the expression was originally a pun on the name of a now defunct Melbourne department store chain, Buckley & Nunn because this second explanation "appears to have arisen after the original phrase was established". This second usage seems to be a 20th century "local adaptation" in Melbourne of the earlier phrase that originated around Sydney.

“Buckley’s chance” is known from 1887 and “two chances...Buckley’s and None’s” from 1893.

The identity of the eponymous Buckley was lost over time and various Buckleys were nominated. In England Buckley was an Irishman struck by an Englishman. In 1893 the question was asked in several South Australian newspapers without a response. In 1912 a newspaper report of an address to the Australian Historical Society named escaped convict William Buckley. The article began:

"The explanation of the term “Buckley’s chance" was given in a reading of a paper “Early Port Phillip and Victoria in the Sixties” at a meeting of the Australian Historical Society last night."

The article recounts Buckley’s story briefly and concludes:

"for over 30 years he had lived with the tribe, not raising them to his level, but descending to theirs, and thus he alone of all the escapees had survived. Hence the term.”

The paper was read by J. H. Watson who had emigrated to Melbourne in 1864 and coincidently first worked there at Buckley and Nunn. The printed paper, published later, gives Buckley’s story but does not mention “Buckley’s chance” so the subject must have arisen as an aside by Watson or raised by a member of the audience. Watson was 70 at the time and he and many of his audience would have lived through the period that the expression became part of the language and for them the defining feature of Buckley’s life was not his providential survival and pardon in 1835 but his chances of survival in 1803, when with the abandonment of the settlement at Port Phillip, as Marcus Clarke wrote, “there could be no hope for the poor runaways”.

The phrase "Buckley’s chance" spread outward from Australia with emigration and into the vernacular of other countries. For example, John Kennedy O’Brien (1907–1979, AKA Jack O’Brien) used this phrase to highlight inter-town travel difficulties following New Zealand’s Murchison Earthquake of 1929; “...from what Mr O’Brien saw of the country, the...man had only Buckley’s chance of reaching his goal”. Although John himself was born in New Zealand, his father, Kennedy Hugh O’Brien (1874-1927), was a native of Victoria, Australia, having emigrated to New Zealand in the mid-1890s, bringing some forms of colloquial language with him. “Buckley’s chance”, it seems, came with him.

== See also ==
- List of convicts transported to Australia
- People rescued and taken in by Aboriginal people
  - Eliza Fraser
  - James Morrill (castaway)
  - Narcisse Pelletier
- Strandloper, a novel about Buckley by Cheshire author Alan Garner
