= Green Team =

- Type: Private
- Industry: Business Services
- Founded: 1993
- Headquarters: New York City
- Number of locations: 6 offices in 4 countries
- Key people: Founder: Hugh Hough; Partners: Milton Kapelus, Jimmie Stone
- Products: Marketing, advertising
- Website: greenteamglobal.com

Green Team is an independent strategic brand communications and creative agency with offices in New York, Sydney, Melbourne, Hobart, São Paulo and Mexico City. Founded in 1993, it is one of the first communications agencies to focus on the areas of sustainability and social responsibility.

Green Team president Hugh Hough was chosen as one of Al Gore's ambassadors for the Inconvenient Truth film in 2007.

== Awakening Consumer ==
Green Team coined the term 'Awakening Consumer', relating to consumers that consider a company's or brand's values in addition to the price/performance ratio, when making a purchase. The Awakening Consumer demographic is similar, though more expansive, to the market segment designated LOHAS.

== Green Team Australia ==
Green Team Australia was established in 2007. Independently owned and operated, it has offices located in Sydney, Melbourne and Hobart. Rowan Smith was co-founder, director and Creative Director of Green Team Australia, alongside Heather Rose, also a director of Green Team Australia, a businesswoman and author in Australia.
