= Mark Clemens =

Australian photographer and author

Mark Clemens (born 1961 in Kiama, NSW) is an Australian photographer and author. His first book The Mountain, a photographic monograph of Mount Wellington in Hobart, Tasmania, was published in 2014 by Peregrine Publishing.

== Books ==
The Mountain is Clemens' first book and comprises a series of photographs on and of Mount Wellington. The foreword was written by acclaimed Tasmanian author Heather Rose.

He self-published The Field of Dreams : walking in Tasmania's first national park in 2016.
