= Giles Hugo =

Australian photographer, writer and journalist

Giles Hugo is an Australian photographer, writer and journalist, and is a member of the International Photographers Alliance.

== Personal life ==
Hugo was born in 1949 in South Africa where he worked as a journalist and sub-editor on many newspapers. For four years he worked in advertising as a copywriter before returning to journalism in 1986 to work on a new Johannesburg-based newspaper, New Nation, that was editorially aligned with the African National Congress.

Hugo is married to Australian poet Anne Kellas.

Hugo decided to take his wife and young family to Australia in mid-1986 and worked for two decades as a sub-editor on the Hobart-based newspaper, The Mercury.

Between 1990 and 1994 Hugo wrote a regular book review column for The Mercury called The Write Stuff, as a side-line to his day job. He reviewed an average of 200 books a year in that period, including books by major Australian and overseas writers. He also conducted interviews with writers such as Vikram Seth, Gwen Harwood, Sarah Day, Peter Goldsworthy, Les Murray, Richard Flanagan, Elizabeth Jolly, Geoffrey Dean and Amy Witting, which were published in The Mercury.

When Hugo stopped reviewing books for The Mercury in 1994, his wife established the online website, The Write Stuff, where Hugo continued reviewing books until the site's focus changed to poetry.

== Photography ==
Hugo's interest in photography began in his childhood when an uncle taught him to use a camera. Throughout his working life and while supporting a growing family, Hugo built up his knowledge and photographic skill. He now devotes all his time to photography.

Working in newspapers both in South Africa and Swaziland allowed Hugo to hone his photographic skills; shooting, developing and printing a photo in under 45 minutes, tackling a wide variety of subjects like portraits, beauty pageants, soccer, motor sport, boxing, ghetto jazz and rock musicians, and street life. He worked mostly in black and white film, with an occasional roll of slide film for special projects and artistic exploration, until the 2000s when he moved to colour photography.

Hugo's first solo photographic exhibition was held in 2015 at the Nolan Gallery at the Salamanca Arts Centre in Hobart, Tasmania.
