= The Rain Heron =

2020 novel by Australian author Robbie Arnott

- Author: Robbie Arnott
- Language: English
- Genre: Novel
- Publisher: Text Publishing
- Publication date: June 2020
- Publication place: Australia
- Media type: Print
- Pages: 240
- Awards: The Age Book of the Year (2021)
- ISBN: 9781922268778
- Preceded by: Flames
- Followed by: Limberlost

The Rain Heron is a 2020 novel by the Australian author Robbie Arnott.

== Synopsis ==
In an unnamed country in an undocumented age a violent coup has overthrown the government and thrown the country under authoritarian military rule. A middle-aged woman named Ren has retreated to live a feral existence on a mountain wanting to remove herself from human contact. There she comes into contact with the heron of the title which she treats with utmost respect and whose existence she guards as jealously as her own. But the coup's army comes to the nearby town looking for the bird; the generals have an acquisitiveness in line with their lust for power. The troops are led by a young woman named Harker who, in her own way, is as physically and emotionally scarred as Ren. What follows is a story of ecological tension, survival and redemption.

== Publishing history ==
After its initial publication in Australia by Text Publishing in 2020, it was reprinted as follows:

- 2020, UK, Atlantic Books
- 2021, USA, Farrar, Straus and Giroux
- 2021 and 2022, Australia, Text Publishing

The novel was also translated into Norwegian in 2021 and French in 2022.

== Critical reception ==
Writing in The Australian Book Review, Laura Elizabeth Woollett wrote: "Although shifts in setting and perspective are handled gracefully, a level of trust in the author is a prerequisite, as the thrust of the narrative is not always clear. Such trust pays off generously. One of the starkest transitions – which takes the reader from the action in the mountains to a cold seaport where a girl learns the ancient art of harvesting squid ink – is also revelatory, its significance rippling outward to inform the wider narrative...[the novel's] environmental concerns, paired with its allegorical quality, could be didactic in less assured hands. By privileging the laws of his fictional universe without reference to contemporary debates, Arnott weaves a narrative that feels both timely and timelessly engaging."

Ellie Robins in the Los Angeles Review of Books noted that there are a number of "arresting visuals in a novel whose mode of narrative propulsion is to move from one striking image to the next. But let's be clear: the lack of interiority, the outward orientation of Arnott's eyeballs, doesn’t equate to shallowness here. These aren't special effects, the spectacle of the screen, or images for the pure sake of optical impact. This is the visuality of myth, in which images are important not for their beauty or grandeur but for their resonance, their power to encapsulate deep truths more fully and potently than any amount of exposition ever could." And concluded: "It's a powerful story, beautifully rendered."

== Awards ==
- The Age Book of the Year - Fiction, 2021 winner
- ALS Gold Medal, 2021 shortlisted
- Australian Book Industry Awards - Small Publishers' Adult Book of the Year, 2021 shortlisted
- Miles Franklin Award, 2021 shortlisted

== See also ==
- 2020 in Australian literature
