= The Roving Party =

2011 novel by Rohan Wilson

- First edition
- Author: Rohan Wilson
- Language: English
- Genre: Western, Historical novel
- Publisher: Allen & Unwin
- Publication date: 2011
- Publication place: Australia
- Media type: Print (Hardback & Paperback)
- Pages: 282
- ISBN: 9781742376530
- Followed by: To Name Those Lost

The Roving Party is a 2011 novel written by Tasmanian author Rohan Wilson. Wilson's first book, it is published by Allen & Unwin. The Roving Party won the 2011 Vogel Award. The novel was also shortlisted for the 2011 Victorian Premier's Literary Awards Vance Palmer Prize for Fiction.

== Plot summary ==
John Batman, ruthless, singleminded; four convicts, the youngest still only a stripling; Gould, a downtrodden farmhand; two free black trackers; and powerful, educated Black Bill, brought up from childhood as a white man. This is the roving party and their purpose is massacre. With promises of freedom, land grants and money, each is willing to risk his life for the prize. Passing over many miles of tortured country, the roving party searches for Aborigines, taking few prisoners and killing freely, Batman never abandoning the visceral intensity of his hunt. And all the while, Black Bill pursues his personal quarry, the much-feared warrior, Mannalargenna.

== Historical basis for novel ==
=== Black Bill and Catherine Kennedy ===
The novel is based on the life of William 'Black Bill' Ponsonby, of whom little survives in the historical record. What is known of William Ponsonby is that he was raised by James Cox of Clarendon, near Nile, in Northern Tasmania. It is unknown how Cox came by an indigenous child but the practice of child abduction was common at the colonial frontier in Tasmania. At some point Ponsonby was baptised and he appears to have worked on Clarendon farm, and became a capable farmer. A man who is highly likely to be Ponsonby is mentioned as a witness to a sexual assault at a farm near Freeman's Reach on the South Esk River in December 1825 and the next mention of him is in his assistance in capturing the Bushranger Thomas Jeffries in December 1826, with local settlers John Batman John Helder Wedge and John Charles Darke. It appears that around this time Ponsonby took up with John Batman as an employed hand.

William Ponsonby went on to assist John Batman with his commission to capture remnants of the Indigenous clans who were attacking settlers in the Ben Lomond district. On September 7, 1829, Ponsonby, in a party of assigned men and mainland Aboriginal men, attacked an indigenous encampment at the Break O'Day Plains (near modern day Fingal) capturing members of the plangermaireener clan as well as killing and wounding several others - the incident described in the novel. At or around this time also met Catherine Kennedy, another baptised Tasmanian Aboriginal raised by settlers at Cross Marsh (now Kempton), in the south of Van Diemens Land, and married her at Batsman's property on 16 August 1830. Shortly afterwards, and due to their success in the aforementioned roving party, John Batman appealed to Governor Arthur to have 100 acres of land granted to William and Catherine as a reward for his service, a controversial proposal at the time. Ponsonby appears to have sought a partner to help run the property but ultimately this land was never granted and was subsequently sold by Batman.

Little more is known of the fate of the couple; however, G.A. Robinson, in his diaries, and John Batman, in his letters, refer to a 'civilised' aboriginal woman at Ben Lomond who was subsequently abducted by hostile Aboriginal clans. James Simpson, police magistrate at Campbell Town wrote in 1831 that, 'Black Kate' left William Ponsonby after a domestic dispute and was 'forcibly taken by the blacks at Ben Lomond', even though she 'spoke nothing of the language'. A similar report in March 1831 described an Aboriginal woman 'brought up by whites' living with two sawyers at 'Stringybark Gully- 6 Miles from Massey's farm' (perhaps under Stringy Bark Tier, near Deddington) - whereupon she was captured when the sawyers were attacked by hostile clansmen. Despite a search party being organised by Massey, it was presumed that she was killed by her abductors .

Subsequently, Robinson reported in his diaries that Catherine Kennedy was killed by Maleteherbargener (probably Moulteherlargenner / Multiyalakina aka Eumarrah an Elder of the Tyerrernotepanner (Stony Creek) Nation.

As to Black Bill, John Glover stated to Robinson in January 1834 that 'Batman's former black absconded and headed a tribe.' but no mention is made of his fate.

=== John Batman ===
See the wikipedia entry for John Batman. John Batman was engaged to track and capture the (Tasmanian) Aboriginal at large that were harassing colonial settlers in the South-Esk and Ben Lomond region. He was initially permitted by Lieut-Governor George Arthur to select a party of nine men including two ‘Sydney Aborigines’ and three ticket-of –leave men commissioned to serve three years in the bush, or in the field police, before receiving conditional pardons. The six others might receive tickets of leave after 12 months service as dictated by Batman's appointment as a leader of a Roving Party under Thomas Anstey, Police Magistrate at Oatlands. Anstey was also responsible for the Roving Party led by Gilbert Robertson that had captured 5 Aboriginal people near Swanport on 7 November 1828. Arthur eventually approved a grant of 2000 acres for Batman after one year of service, making the commission a profitable venture for Batman.

=== The 'Dharug' ===
Pigeon and John Crook were two Aboriginal men employed by John Batman for the purposes of tracking Indigenous Tasmanians. In the novel they are described as 'Dharug', that is men of the Dharug Nation from the modern day Sydney Basin area. Pigeon and Crook emigrated to Van Diemens Land at Batman's request sometime before September 1829, however they were not Dharug men. Pigeon (Indigenous name Beewurher/Warroba) was a Yuin man from the Shoalhaven area and John Crook (Indigenous name Yunbai) was from the Illawarra or Tharrawal language group in southern NSW. After the success of the operation described in the novel, Pigeon and Crook accompanied Batman back to Sydney for the purposes of procuring more Indigenous men. Ultimately, 7 NSW Indigenous men were employed by Batman for Roving Parties over the 4 years between 1829-1833 and were based at his property at Kingston on the Ben Lomond Rivulet. Command of the NSW men, and further Roving Parties, was taken by Anthony Cottrell, a local constable and pound-keeper, but further successes may have been attributable to the employment of a Tasmanian Indigenous woman karnebutcher or 'Sall' rather than the presence of the NSW men. Pigeon and Crook were also reported to have been recommended land grants adjacent to Kingston but, although plans of the region show their grants, they never took up the land. It appears that Batman sold these allotments, along with William Ponsonby's, to help finance his expedition to Port Phillip and the founding of Melbourne. Due to the discontent of the men, and their perceived lack of efficacy by the colonial government, all of the NSW men were returned to NSW by March 1833.

=== James Gumm ===
James Gumm was a convict transported to Van Diemens Land in 1822. By the time of his employment with John Batman he was a'ticket of leave' man and he was employed by John Batman as a general farmhand or for the purposes of capturing hostile Indigenous clanspeople. He had a long relationship with Batman, after the events described in the novel he remained a roving party member under the leadership of Cottrell but probably still residing at Kingston. Gumm accompanied John Batman when he sailed to Port Phillip in the venture to establish a settlement that would eventually become the city of Melbourne.

== Awards and nominations ==
- 2011 shortlisted Victorian Premier's Literary Awards — The Vance Palmer Prize for Fiction
- 2011 winner The Australian/Vogel Literary Award (for an unpublished manuscript)
- 2012 winner New South Wales Premier's Literary Awards — UTS Award for New Writing
- 2012 shortlisted New South Wales Premier's Literary Awards — Christina Stead Prize for Fiction
- 2012 co-winner The Sydney Morning Herald Best Young Novelist of the Year
- 2012 shortlisted Australian Book Industry Awards (ABIA) — Australian Newcomer of the Year
- 2012 shortlisted The National Year of Reading 2012 Our Story Collection — Tasmania
- 2012 shortlisted Festival Awards for Literature (SA) — Award for Fiction
- 2012 shortlisted Indie Awards — Debut Fiction
- 2013 winner Tasmanian Premier's Literary Prizes — Margaret Scott Prize
- 2013 shortlisted Tasmania Book Prizes — Tasmania Book Prize
