= Bancoora Surf Life Saving Club =

Suf lifesaving club in Victoria, Australia

- Full name: Bancoora Surf Life Saving Club
- Nickname: Bancoora
- Sport: Surf lifesaving
- Founded: 10 January 1963
- Location: Bancoora Beach, Victoria, Australia
- Colours: Yellow, black and red
- Website: www.bancooraslsc.com.au

Bancoora Surf Life Saving Club is a volunteer surf lifesaving club located at Bancoora Beach in Breamlea, Victoria, Australia. Established in 1963, the club provides patrols along the exposed ocean beach. Both the club and the beach take their names from the SS Bancoora, a vessel wrecked on the adjacent Breamlea Beach in 1891 while transporting exotic animals to Geelong.

== History ==
Bancoora Surf Life Saving Club was founded on 10 January 1963 amid increasing recreational use of Bancoora Beach. Assistance during the club's establishment came from neighbouring surf lifesaving clubs including Torquay Surf Life Saving Club, Point Lonsdale Surf Life Saving Club and Anglesea Surf Life Saving Club. The Barwon Shire Council also supported the new organisation through works undertaken at the beach, including the removal of submerged rocks, and the provision of land for club facilities.

The club began with 42 members during its inaugural season. Early office bearers included C. Cameron as president, Graeme Long as secretary, C. Rogers as treasurer, and Les Inglis as club captain. Patrols commenced during the 1962–63 season after members completed Bronze Medallion training under instructor Kevin Roderick, who had previously been associated with the Lakes Entrance Surf Life Saving Club.

Construction of the club's first permanent facilities began in 1963. During the same period Bancoora received equipment donations from neighbouring clubs, including a surf reel from Torquay and a line from Anglesea. The club also acquired its first surfboat, "Gladys Bell", during the 1963–64 season. This has since been moved to England.

Additional community support developed through the formation of a ladies auxiliary in the mid-1960s. Bancoora held its first surf carnival in December 1964, while a club newsletter introduced in 1966 later became known as "Ebb Tide".

The original clubhouse was destroyed by fire on 8 April 1987, resulting in the loss of many of the club records and historical items. The club subsequently operated from a temporary tin shed until a replacement clubhouse began construction in 1989, and was completed in October 1992.

The club made 13 rescues during the 2020–2021 season, as well as totalling 2000 hours of patrols on the beach.

In the lead-up to the 2022 Victorian State Election, both the Liberals and Labor pledged funding for an upgrade to the clubrooms, owing to the growth in population in the region, particularly Armstrong Creek.
