= James Boyce (author) =

Australian author and historian

James Boyce is an Australian author and historian based in Tasmania. He has written four major books on Australian history and the history of Western thought.

== Early life and education ==
Boyce earned a PhD from the University of Tasmania in Geography and Environmental Studies.

== Career ==
Boyce is an honorary research associate at the University of Tasmania.

== Gambling industry ==
Following his writing of Losing Streak, Boyce became closely related to efforts to control the poker machine industry in Tasmania and in Australia. This work built on his previous career in social work and social policy research.

He has been called before parliamentary committees to give evidence about the harms of the industry as well as the history, as well as working with members of parliament with similar goals.

He has also written extensively in the Australian press on the topic, specifically about the deals that allowed Federal Group to gain a monopoly on Tasmania's two casinos and all the state's poker machines. He continued the fight against the Farrel family and their intervention into Tasmanian politics to ensure the continuation of their monopolies, and he was particularly scathing about their conduct during the 2018 Tasmanian state election, where Boyce claimed that "we are watching an election being bought before our eyes" due to the massive advertising blitz that the gambling industry poured into the campaign after the Labor Party promised to phase out all poker machines.

== Accolades ==
He has won several awards for his books, including The Age Book of the Year, the Tasmania Book Prize twice, and the Colin Roderick Award. His books have been shortlisted for various other awards, including the Prime Minister's Literary Award, and the Victorian, New South Wales and Western Australian Premier's Book Awards.

== Selected works ==
- Imperial Mud: The Fight for the Fens. Icon Books. 2020 ISBN 9781785786501
- Losing Streak: How Tasmania was gamed by the gambling industry. Black Inc. Redback. 2017. ISBN 978-1863959100
- Born Bad: Original Sin and the Making of the Western World. Black Inc 2015, Counterpoint. 2016. ISBN 978-1619024984
- 1835: The Founding of Melbourne & the Conquest of Australia. Black Inc. 2011. ISBN 978-1863956000
- Van Dieman’s Land. Black Inc. 2008. ISBN 978-1863954914
