= Flames (novel) =

2018 novel by Robbie Arnott

- First edition cover
- Author: Robbie Arnott
- Cover artist: W. H. Chong
- Language: English
- Genre: Magical realism
- Publisher: Text Publishing
- Publication date: May 2018
- Publication place: Australia
- Media type: Print
- Pages: 256
- ISBN: 978-1-922-26821-1
- Followed by: The Rain Heron

Flames is a 2018 debut magical realism novel by Australian author Robbie Arnott. First published by Text Publishing, the novel follows siblings Levi and Charlotte, who react differently to their mother's death.

Each chapter of the novel is written from a different character's perspective, in an attempt by the author to maintain reader's interest. Inspiration was drawn from multiple sources, mainly that of the Tasmanian landscape and how that landscape affects people.

The novel has won the Margaret Scott Prize in 2019 and has been shortlisted and longlisted for multiple literary awards. It has received generally positive praise since its publication.

== Plot ==
Two days after siblings Levi and Charlotte McAllister spread their mother Edith's ashes in Notley Fern Gorge, she returns to life. Edith, unresponsive to her children, walks to their father Jack's house and self immolates on his front lawn. Whilst Charlotte grows increasingly paranoid that the same thing may happen to her, Levi resolves to build her a coffin strong enough so that she may not return after burial. Upon the discovery of Levi's plans, Charlotte flees in terror. After fighting off a pair of miners in Tunbridge who had attempted to assault her, Charlotte decides to travel to Melaleuca, a secluded locality the miners had mentioned in conversation.

Levi, meanwhile, makes contact with Thurston Hough, an expert coffin maker, who claims to have killed a water rat whose pelt offers strange powers, granting confidence to those who possess it. In reality, the water rat was the Esk God, a deity presiding over the esk rivers of Tasmania. Hough reports that he cannot complete work on the coffin as the animals along the river have begun terrorising him, in retaliation over the Esk God's death.

Levi hires a detective to locate Charlotte. The detective travels to Tunbridge and meets the miners, who reveal Charlotte's plans to travel to Melaleuca. Charlotte, meanwhile, has begun working at a wombat farm in Melaleuca. The wombats are slowly being killed by a cormorant. The farm's manager, Allen Gibson, slowly descends into madness, eventually realising that he has been slaughtering the wombats, possessed by the cormorant's spirit. The possessed Allen attacks Charlotte, who begins to sprout flames from her body. Allen retreats into a cave, being followed by the flames. Charlotte and the other farmhand, Nicola, make contact with the ranger, who transports them out of Melaleuca. Meanwhile, the detective arrives as the farmland is burning. A man, Jack, walks towards the detective and tells her to leave his daughter, Charlotte, alone. Charlotte and Nicola travel to a stone cabin owned by Nicola's relative in Cradle Mountain, hiding out. A romance develops between them. Charlotte, who still produces flames from her body, realises that Nicola's touch is the only thing that prevents the flames from forming. The detective, meanwhile, arrives at the cabin and urges Charlotte to return to her brother.

Our mother returned to us two days after we spread her ashes over Notley Fern Gorge. She was definitely our mother—but, at the same time, she was not our mother at all. Since her dispersal among the fronds of Notley, she had changed.

— Robbie Arnott, Flames (2018)

Levi retrieves the half-finished coffin and the Esk God's pelt from Hough's house, discovering that Hough has been killed by the animals along the river. He returns home to find his father, Jack, in his house. Jack reveals to Levi that he is in reality an ancient fire spirit, who can teleport to and from any fire source and influence people to his will. Jack reveals that, when he first met Levi's mother Edith, he influenced her to begin loving him. Once Edith found out, despite loving Jack, she left him; he explains that this is the reason Jack has distanced himself from his children. Against his father's wishes, Levi, influenced by the pelt, travels to Notley Fern Gorge to complete the half-finished coffin.

The detective convinces Charlotte and Nicola to reunite with Levi. The travel to the gorge, where Levi is mentally unstable, focused solely on finishing the coffin. Charlotte, enraged at her brother, is unable to control the flames from her body, which ignite the nearby forest. Jack appears from the flames to whisper something to Charlotte, before leaving. Suddenly, a large downpour extinguishes the forest fire, the downpour being a manifestation of the Cloud God's grief for the Esk God's death; the two had been in love. Sometime later, Levi awakes in hospital. Charlotte informs him that the forest fire was extinguished by the largest flood in centuries. She also tells him that the detective has left, and Nicola is in the hospital for burn injuries. The siblings visit Nicola in her hospital room, where Levi breaks down and sobs. Nicola suggests he go fishing with her father, Karl.

Sometime later, Levi and Karl are looking for a seal pup on the river. Levi dives into the water and is united with a seal pup. Levi reveals that it has given him new meaning and purpose to his life.

== Principal characters ==
- Levi McAllister, brother of Charlotte, who builds a coffin for his sister after their mother's death.
- Charlotte McAllister, sister of Levi, who flees across Tasmania after discovering Levi's plans to build her a coffin.
- Jack McAllister, an ancient fire spirit who has taken on the form of a man after falling in love with Edith.
- Edith McAllister, recently deceased mother of Levi and Charlotte.
- Karl, a fisherman and Nicola's father.
- The Detective, a private investigator hired by Levi to locate Charlotte.
- Nicola; Karl's daughter who falls in love with Charlotte.
- Allen Gibson, manager of the wombat farm at Melaleuca.
- The Esk God, deity of the esk rivers of Tasmania.
- Thurston Hough, a coffin builder hired by Levi.

== Style ==
Each chapter of the novel is written from a different character's perspective, ranging from first-person, third-person, epistolary, present and past tense. Arnott described the novel as one that "never follows a traditional narrative; each chapter is told from the perspective of a different character Charlotte or Levi encounters, often in a different genre". He wrote the novel from multiple perspectives in order to properly capture the wild environment of Tasmania and because he wanted each chapter to feel "fresh" and "exciting". He wrote each chapter as if he were "starting a new book but telling the same story", writing with the only rule to "never [...] let it be boring". The novel's central genre is magical realism, although it has been described as a novel that "confidently borrows from the genres of crime fiction, thriller, romance, comedy, eco-literature, and magical realism, throws them in the air, and lets the pieces land to form a flaming new world".

Arnott described the novel as a story of "love, grief, family and of the natural world, and how all these things effect each other", with a specific emphasis on grief and "how [people] react to it". Arnott deliberately chose not to include the word "Tasmania" in the entire novel, because he felt that it was unnecessary, in the same way that certain novels set in New York do not name "New York" specifically, as everyone knows in which city they are set.

== Background ==
=== Inspiration ===
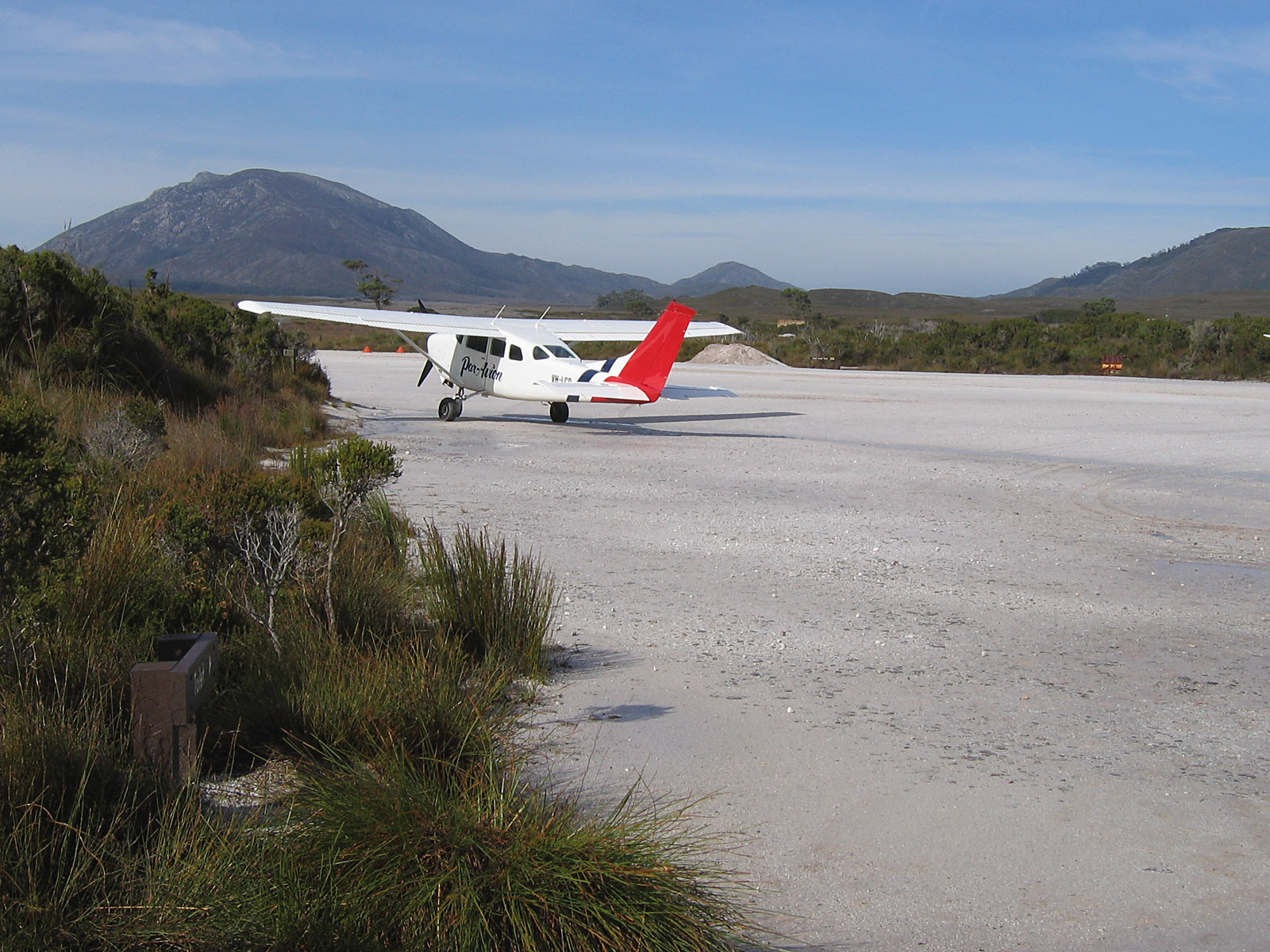
The airstrip at Melaleuca, Tasmania. Arnott drew on Deny King's experiences living on the island when writing the novel.

Arnott wished to write a novel that was "surprising, emotional and rewarding to read". He also wished to write about Tasmania "in a way that hadn't been done before, with a story that felt completely impossible but also somehow recognisable". The Tasmanian landscape was the main inspiration for the novel: "Not just how it appears, but how it makes you feel," Arnott wrote. Arnott was reading the memoir H is for Hawk whilst writing the novel; he noted that "its interrogation of grief, and the relationship between the author and her half-wild goshawk, left a heavy mark on my own work". Arnott cited Tasmanian author Marjorie Bligh and Deny King as influences on his work. Bligh served as the inspiration for a character in the novel, while Arnott drew on King's experiences in Melaleuca while writing the chapters set on that island. Arnott claimed that Karl's seal was inspired by the seals he had observed whilst tuna fishing. Arnott's use of animals in the novel as prominent, aware characters in the novel was partly inspired by Ancient Greek myths and fables, with Arnott's intention of making the world of the novel "as strange as [he] possibly could". Arnott decided to centre his novel around fire and flames after the 2013 Tasmanian bushfires; the destruction caused by the fires had an effect on Arnott, something which "kept coming back to [him]" in his writing.

=== Writing ===
Arnott had originally intended to write a "very straight, realist [...] novel", but realised that what he was writing was "really boring". Arnott tried a different direction, writing something that he believed to be "different", "strange" and "entertaining". Arnott claimed that the novel's first chapter began as a short story, originally published in mid-2017. The story was met with positive feedback, which led Arnott to develop the story into a complete novel, which took him seven to eight months to complete: "I barely slept and it drove me crazy, but I finished it." Arnott contributed with editors from Text Publishing in producing the final draft of Flames. After Arnott completing the novel, the editing team altered "only a few chapters" and added a new chapter to produce the finished draft. When writing the chapter featuring Thurston Hough, Arnott researched different types of Tasmanian wood in order to write "strange" and "compelling" coffins that the coffin builder had created.

The novel was first launched at Fullers Bookshop in Hobart, officially unveiled by Australian author Richard Flanagan. The front and back cover, designed by W. H. Chong, was inspired by the c. 1936 colour lithograph Tasmania, the Wonderland by Harry Kelly, which was hung on the wall near Arnott's desk while he was writing the novel.

== Publication history ==
The first edition of Flames was published by Text Publishing in Melbourne, Victoria in May 2018. The book was reprinted as follows:

- 1 November 2018: Atlantic Books (London, England)
- 1 August 2019: Atlantic Books (London, England)
- May 2020: Text Publishing (Melbourne, Victoria). Also released as an eBook.

The novel, retitled Flammes, was also translated into French by Laure Manceau. It was published in France in 2019 and Quebec, Canada in 2021. An English language audiobook, narrated by Henry Nixon and Anna Skellern, was released by W. F. Howes in 2020.

== Awards and nominations ==
Year	Award	Result	Ref
2018	Readings Prize for New Australian Fiction	Shortlisted	
2018	University of Queensland Fiction Book Award	Shortlisted	
2019	ALS Gold Medal	Longlisted	
2019	Indie Book Awards for Debut Fiction	Longlisted	
2019	Kathleen Mitchell Award	Shortlisted	
2019	Margaret Scott Prize	Won	
2019	Miles Franklin Literary Award	Longlisted	
2019	MUD Literary Club	Shortlisted	
2019	Not the Booker Prize	Shortlisted	
2019	The Sydney Morning Herald Best Young Australian Novelists	Won	
2019	Tasmania Book Prize	Shortlisted	
2019	UTS Glenda Adams Award for New Writing	Shortlisted	
2019	Victrorian Premier's Literary Award for Fiction	Shortlisted	
2019	Voss Literary Prize	Longlisted	
2020	International Dublin Literary Award	Longlisted	

== Reception ==
Flames has received generally positive feedback since its publication. Tasmanian readers and bookshops were "hugely supportive" of Flames upon its publication. Sam Jordison, writing in The Guardian, believed that the novel was "solid, significant and emotionally resonant" and praised Arnott's description of the Tasmanian landscape. He felt "charmed" by the novel, which "convinced [him that] it was about real people and an important place". However, he felt that the novel's structure was "ambitious" and believed that certain characters and chapters were "fleeting", criticising Arnott's strained attempts at humour. Sarah Dempster, writing in The Sydney Morning Herald, commented that the novel "explores the sublime power of the Australian state at the bottom of the world". Australian author Richard Flanagan, who had officially launched the novel, described the work as "a strange and joyous marvel".

Ellen Cregan, writing for Kill Your Darlings, described the novel as being "incredibly unique and memorable", praising Arnott's "vivid precision" in his writing about Tasmania and his ability to "paint a rich and memorable picture with prose of an exceptionally high quality". Jessie Nielson, writing in the Otago Daily Times, described it as a "finely built and realised first novel" and praised Arnott's "complicated yet tightly strategised" narrative. Nielson praised Arnott's use of humour to relieve dark moments and felt that the characters each had "lovable, empathetic qualities". A reviewer for The Saturday Paper, noted comparisons between certain chapters of the novel and other literary works, such as Raymond Chandler's The Big Sleep, Alfred Hitchcock's The Birds and Stephen King's Firestarter. The reviewer stated that "the finale isn’t entirely satisfying, dramatically or semantically, but the novel's playfulness and poetry make for a fresh and entertaining read". Philip Matthews, writing for the New Zealand website Stuff, praised the novel as "an assured, funny and highly imaginative work", commenting that, although the novel in intrinsically Tasmanian, native readers would still understand and enjoy the book.

Flames has been included as a text in the Victorian Certificate of Education school curriculum.

== Television adaptation ==
In June 2020, it was reported that Flames would be adapted into a six-part television series, with $20,000 funded by the Tasmanian Government. The series is set to be produced by Jungle Entertainment, with Chloe Rickard serving as executive producer. Marieke Hardy will be lead writer for the series, whilst Arnott will act as a consultant.
