= Robbie Arnott =

Australian author

- Born: Launceston, Tasmania, Australia
- Occupation: Author
- Years active: 2018–present
- Known for: Flames (2018); The Rain Heron (2020); Limberlost (2022); Dusk (2024)

Robbie Arnott (born 1988 or 1989) is an Australian author. He is known for his novels Flames (2018), The Rain Heron (2020), and Limberlost (2022), and Dusk (2024), all of which were nominated for or won Australian literary awards.

== Career ==
Arnott's early writing appeared in literary publications Island Magazine, Kill Your Darlings and The Lifted Brow. In 2014, Arnott was awarded the Scribe Nonfiction Prize for Young Writers, and in 2015 won the Tasmanian Young Writer's Fellowship.

Flames, Arnott's first novel, was released by Text Publishing in Australia in 2018. The novel was longlisted for the Miles Franklin Award in 2019 and was nominated for the Victorian Premier's Literary Award for fiction. Following the release of Flames, Arnott was named a Sydney Morning Herald Best Young Novelist, a title awarded to select Australian authors under the age of 35 at the time their work was published. Flames has been included as a text in Australian VCE (Victorian) school curriculum.

The Rain Heron, Arnott's second novel, was released in 2020, and won The Age Book of the Year Award as well as being shortlisted for the Miles Franklin Award. Critics noted the novel continued Arnott's style of "risk-taking" and "daring" literary fiction, with a positive reception to its environmental messages.

The third novel from Arnott, Limberlost, was released in 2022. It became Arnott's second novel to win The Age Book of the Year Award, was shortlisted for the 2023 Miles Franklin Award, and won the 2023 Voss Literary Prize. It was also longlisted for the 2024 International Dublin Literary Award. Like Arnott's previous novels, Limberlost found critical success both in Australia and internationally, with positive reviews from noted critics and newspapers.

His fourth novel, Dusk, was published in October 2024. It won the 2025 Indie Book Awards Book of the Year – Fiction and was joint winner of the ARA Historical Novel Prize.

As of 2025 he was working at an advertising agency three days a week, and devoting one day per week to writing.

== Personal life ==
Robbie Arnott was born in 1988 or 1989 in Launceston, Tasmania.

He married Emily, and as of March 2025 they had one daughter and were expecting their second child. They were living in Hobart.

== Awards ==
| Year | Work | Award | Category | Result | Ref |
|---|---|---|---|---|---|
| 2018 | Flames | Queensland Literary Awards | Fiction | Shortlisted | |
| 2018 | Flames | Readings Prize | New Australian Fiction | Shortlisted | |
| 2019 | Flames | ALS Gold Medal | — | Longlisted | |
| 2019 | Flames | Indie Book Awards | Debut Fiction | Longlisted | |
| 2019 | Flames | Miles Franklin Award | — | Longlisted | |
| 2019 | Flames | MUD Literary Prize | — | Shortlisted | |
| 2019 | Flames | NSW Premier's Literary Award | UTS Glenda Adams Award for New Writing | Shortlisted | |
| 2019 | Flames | Not the Booker Prize | — | Shortlisted | |
| 2019 | Flames | Victorian Premier's Literary Awards | Vance Palmer Prize for Fiction | Shortlisted | |
| 2020 | Flames | International Dublin Literary Award | — | Longlisted | |
| 2020 | Flames | Voss Literary Prize | — | Longlisted | |
| 2021 | The Rain Heron | Australian Book Industry Awards | Small Publisher Adult Book | Shortlisted | |
| 2021 | The Rain Heron | Miles Franklin Award | — | Shortlisted | |
| 2021 | The Rain Heron | Voss Literary Prize | — | Shortlisted | |
| 2022 | The Rain Heron | Tasmanian Literary Awards | Fiction | Longlisted | |
| 2022 | The Rain Heron | William Saroyan International Prize for Writing | Fiction | Shortlisted | |
| 2023 | Limberlost | ARA Historical Novel Prize | Adult | Longlisted | |
| 2023 | Limberlost | Australian Book Industry Awards | Literary Fiction | Shortlisted | |
| 2023 | Limberlost | Dylan Thomas Prize | — | Shortlisted | |
| 2023 | Limberlost | Indie Book Award | Fiction | Shortlisted | |
| 2023 | Limberlost | Voss Literary Prize | — | Won | |
| 2024 | Limberlost | Dick and Joan Green Family Award for Tasmanian History | — | Won | |
| 2024 | Limberlost | International Dublin Literary Award | — | Longlisted | |
| 2024 | Dusk | The Guardian's Top 25 Best Australian Books of 2024 | — | Won | |
| 2025 | Dusk | Australian Book Industry Awards | Literary Fiction | Won | |
| 2025 | Dusk | ARA Historical Novel Prize | Adult (joint winner) | Won | |

== Bibliography ==
=== Novels ===
- Arnott, Robbie (2018). Flames. Text Publishing.
- — (2020). The rain heron. Text Publishing.
- — (2022). Limberlost. Text Publishing.
- — (2024). Dusk. Pan Macmillan.

=== Novella ===
- Arnott, Robbie (2019). The hall chimp. Atlantic Books.

=== Critical studies and reviews of Arnott's work ===
Limberlost

- Mills, Jennifer (October 2022). "A distant leviathan : Robbie Arnott's realist new novel". Australian Book Review. 447: 38.
