= Barwon Water =

Barwon Water (full name Barwon Region Water Corporation) is a government owned statutory authority that controls much of the water system in Geelong, Victoria, Australia including the reservoirs, and the sewerage and drainage system that services the city and surrounding districts. With a service area covering approximately 8100 square kilometres, the boundaries are Little River in the north, the Bellarine Peninsula in the east, Meredith and Cressy in the north, and Apollo Bay to the south-west.

The organisation dates back to 1908 when the Geelong Municipal Waterworks Trust was created, and expanded to become the Geelong Waterworks and Sewerage Trust in 1910. In 1984 the trust was merged with other local water and sewage authorities to form the Geelong and District Water Board, and again restructured to form the Barwon Region Water Authority in 1994 (trading as Barwon Water).
