= Rohan Wilson =

Australian writer

- Born: Launceston, Tasmania, Australia
- Occupation: writer
- Writing career
- Language: English
- Notable work: The Roving Party
- Notable awards: The Australian/Vogel Literary Award, Victorian Premier's Literary Awards

Rohan Wilson is an Australian novelist who was born and raised in Launceston, Tasmania, where he currently lives.

He holds degrees and diplomas from the universities of Tasmania, Southern Queensland and Melbourne. In 2003 he travelled to Japan, where he worked as an English teacher for several years. On returning to Australia with his wife and child, he completed his thesis, The Roving Party : Extinction Discourse in the Literature of Tasmania for his Master of Arts from the University of Melbourne.

His first novel, The Roving Party, won The Australian/Vogel Literary Award (for an unpublished manuscript) in 2011 and was subsequently shortlisted for a number of Australian literary awards. His second novel, To Name Those Lost, won the author the 2016 Victorian Premier's Literary Awards — The Vance Palmer Prize for Fiction. His third novel, Daughter of Bad Times, was shortlisted for the 2019 Queensland Literary Awards' Courier-Mail People's Choice Queensland Book of the Year Award and The University of Queensland Fiction Book Award.

== Novels ==
- The Roving Party (2011)
- To Name Those Lost (2014)
- Daughter of Bad Times (2019)

== Awards ==
- 2011 winner The Australian/Vogel Literary Award (for an unpublished manuscript) — The Roving Party
- 2012 winner New South Wales Premier's Literary Awards — UTS Award for New Writing — The Roving Party
- 2012 co-winner The Sydney Morning Herald Best Young Novelist of the Year
- 2013 winner Tasmania Book Prizes — Margaret Scott Prize - The Roving Party
- 2015 winner Tasmania Book Prize — People's Choice Award — To Name Those Lost
- 2016 winner Victorian Premier's Literary Awards — The Vance Palmer Prize for Fiction — To Name Those Lost
- 2019 finalist Queensland Literary Awards — The Courier-Mail People's Choice Queensland Book of the Year Award — Daughter of Bad Times
- 2019 finalist Queensland Literary Awards — The University of Queensland Fiction Book Award — Daughter of Bad Times
