= The Museum of Modern Love =

2016 novel by Heather Rose

- cover of 2nd edition, 2018
- Author: Heather Rose
- Cover artist: Sandy Cull
- Language: English
- Published: 2016 (Allen & Unwin)
- Publication place: Australia
- Media type: Print (paperback)
- Pages: 286
- ISBN: 9781760291860

The Museum of Modern Love is the seventh novel by Australian writer Heather Rose. The book won three literary awards, including the 2017 Stella Prize.

Rose was influenced by performance artist Marina Abramovic's The Artist Is Present, where the latter sat for eight hours a day for 75 days at the Museum of Modern Art in New York while spectators watched.

== Plot ==
The main character, Arky Levin, composes soundtracks for movies. His wife, Lydia Fiorentino, has a degenerative illness and, fearing his inability to care for her, has moved into a full-time care facility. Arky finds himself drawn to the Museum of Modern Art, where he watches Marina Abramovic's daily performances. Other visitors to the exhibition become part of the narrative as do his colleagues and friends. The book details his search for meaning in his life.

== Major themes ==
The chair of the 2017 Stella Prize judges, Brenda Walker, claimed the book was full of "such dazzling and subtle explorations of the importance of art in everyday life". Reviewer Camilla Nelson describes the book as "a fictional exploration of the power of art to transform individual lives, written in exquisite prose, with rare and subtle insight".

== Publication history ==
- 2016, Australia, Allen & Unwin ISBN 9781760291860, 24 August 2016, paperback
- 2018, USA, Algonquin Books of Chapel Hill, ISBN 9781616208523, 161620852X, 9781616209544, 1616209542
- 2018, Catalan edition, Editorial Les Hores, translated by Carme Geronès
- 2018, UK edition, Weidenfeld and Nicolson ISBN 978-1525229282
- 2018, Greek edition, Psichogios ISBN 978-6180126976
- 2018, Thai edition, ISBN 978-616-485-565-6
- 2018, South Korean edition, ISBN 979-11-6040-339-8

== Literary significance and reception ==
Louise Swinn in The Sydney Morning Herald noted that "this bold new novel by Heather Rose is an astute meditation on art, bravery, friendship, love, how to live, and on dying."

Peter Pierce in the Sydney Review of Books notes in a review of all Rose's works, leading up to and including The Museum of Modern Love, "Heather Rose's career as a novelist has been pursued with a calm daring... All her fiction presents challenges to the heart and to the inquiring mind."

The Book Page's Annie Peters notes "The Museum of Modern Love is an engaging, multifaceted meditation on the meaning of life and art. Rose sets this exploration in the context of one man's compelling midlife search for direction as he observes Abramović's fleeting art, which the novel intriguingly brings back to life. This is a brilliant find for any reader who enjoys grappling with the larger questions of life and literature, and it is an excellent choice for book clubs seeking thought-provoking discussion."

A review by NPR (USA) by Heller McAlpin on 10 December 2018 titled "Art Restores The Soul In 'Museum Of Modern Love' " notes that Rose "displays a deep appreciation of art and a deft ability to blend fact, fiction, abstract ideas, and sentiment..."

The Museum of Modern Love was the first book by Rose to be published in the United States. It was also the first of her books to be set outside her home state of Tasmania. Tacey Rychter of The New York Times profiled Rose in November 2018 on the eve of launch event at the Museum of Modern Art.

Rose was honoured when Abramovic agreed to launch that edition in the Museum of Modern Art in 2018.

== Awards and nominations ==
- Winner, Stella Prize, 2017
- Winner, Christina Stead Prize for Fiction, New South Wales Premier's Literary Awards, 2017
- Winner, Margaret Scott Prize, Tasmanian Literary Awards, 2017
- Shortlisted, ALS Gold Medal, 2017
- Shortlisted, University of Queensland Fiction Book Award, Queensland Literary Awards, 2017
- Longlisted, International Dublin Literary Award, 2018

== Adaptations ==
A theatre adaptation by Tom Holloway premiered at the 2022 Sydney Festival.

The Sydney Morning Herald noting "The Museum of Modern Love's shift to stage is unmissable".
