= Danielle Wood (writer) =

Australian journalist, writer and academic

- Born: 11 August 1972 (age 54); Hobart, Tasmania, Australia
- Education: Bachelor of Arts; Ph.D
- Alma mater: University of Tasmania; Edith Cowan University
- Occupation: Writer
- Writing career
- Genre: Literary Fiction
- Website: www.daniellewood.com.au

Danielle Wood (born 11 August 1972) is an Australian journalist, writer, and academic. Her first book, The Alphabet of Light and Dark, won The Australian/Vogel Literary Award in 2002. As Minnie Darke, she writes romance novels. She also writes with Heather Rose using the pseudonym, Angelica Banks.

== Biography ==
Danielle Wood was born on 11 August 1972 in Hobart, Tasmania. She was educated at The Friends' School in Hobart and went on to complete a Bachelor of Arts with honours from the University of Tasmania, before working as a cadet journalist.

At age 26, Wood moved to Western Australia and enrolled in a PhD through Edith Cowan University, starting work on her book at the same time. She has since returned to Tasmania where she was as of 2025 a senior lecturer at University of Tasmania, Sandy Bay.

== Books ==
- The Alphabet of Light and Dark, Allen & Unwin, 2003, ISBN 9781741140651
- Rosie Little’s Cautionary Tales for Girls, Allen & Unwin, 2006, ISBN 9781741149302
- Housewife Superstar: the very best of Marjorie Bligh, Text Publishing, 2011, ISBN 9781921758850
- Marjorie Bligh’s HOME: Hints On Managing Everything, Text Publishing, 2012, ISBN 9781922079077
- Deep South: Stories from Tasmania, co-edited with Ralph Crane, Text Publishing, 2012, ISBN 9781922079022
- Mothers Grimm, Allen & Unwin, 2014, ISBN 9781741756746
- Island Story, Tasmania in Object and Text, Text Publishing, 2018, ISBN 9781925626926

=== As Angelica Banks, with Heather Rose ===
Tuesday McGillycuddy series:

- Finding Serendipity, Allen & Unwin, 2013, ISBN 9781743310311
- A Week Without Tuesday, Allen & Unwin, 2015, ISBN 9781760110376
- Blueberry Pancakes Forever, Allen & Unwin, 2016, ISBN 9781760110451

=== As Minnie Darke ===
- Star-crossed, Penguin, 2019, ISBN 9780143792277
- The Lost Love Song, Penguin, 2020, ISBN 9780143792307
- With Love from Wish and Co, Michael Joseph, 2022, ISBN 9781760897796
- Wild Apples, Audible Studios (audiobook), 2023
- The Yellow Wood, Audible Studios (audiobook), 2024
- Three Juliets, Penguin, 2025, ISBN 9781760897819

== Awards and nominations ==
- 1999: Famine Commemorative Literary Prize
- 2002: Australian/Vogel Literary Award for The Alphabet of Light and Dark
- 2004: Dobbie Literary Award for The Alphabet of Light and Dark
- 2004: Best Young Novelist, Sydney Morning Herald
- 2004: shortlisted for the Commonwealth Writers' Prize in the Best First Book category for the SE Asia and South Pacific Region for The Alphabet of Light and Dark
- 2005: listed for IMPAC Dublin Literary Award for The Alphabet of Light and Dark
- 2007: Best Young Novelist, Sydney Morning Herald
- 2012: Alex Buzo Prize
- 2019: Tasmanian Premier's Literary Prizes: Margaret Scott Prize People's Choice for Star-crossed
