= Dusk (Arnott novel) =

2024 novel by Australian author Robbie Arnott

- Author: Robbie Arnott
- Language: English
- Genre: Literary novel
- Publisher: Picador
- Publication date: 8 October 2024
- Publication place: Australia
- Media type: Print
- Pages: 264 pp.
- Awards: 2025 Indie Book Awards Book of the Year – Fiction, winner
- ISBN: 9781761560941

Dusk is a 2024 novel by the Australian author Robbie Arnott.

It was the winner of the 2025 Indie Book Awards Book of the Year – Fiction and joint winner of the ARA Historical Novel Prize.

== Synopsis ==
In Western Tasmania, in what is possibly the 19th century, twins Iris and Floyd Renshaw learn of a bounty that has been placed on a puma that has been killing shepherds in the high country. The local farmers have called this puma Dusk, and it appears to be the last of a group of such predators that were introduced to eradicate feral deer. The puma, however, preferred the easier target offered by the farmers' sheep. Despite the bounty, and a number of hunters that have set out in pursuit of it, Dusk remains at large, and extremely cunning and dangerous.

The twins have no experience in hunting, but a lot in tracking animals across rugged country, and so join forces with another hunter who needs their unique skills.

== Critical reception ==
Reviewing the novel for Australian Book Review Shannon Burns noted that "Dusk generates pathos with delicate expertise and mixes genres while retaining a strong semblance of realism." He continued: "Still, I wonder if Arnott may have exhausted his primary material and is consequently repeating himself too closely. While it is skilfully done, Dusk reads like a companion or addendum to The Rain Heron, which itself recycled versions of a fable within its multi-part structure." And he concluded: "Dusk's pleasures are immediate, and welcome, but short-lived."

In The Guardian James Bradley praised Arnott's evocation of landscape: "Much of the magic of Dusk grows out of the writing. As anybody who has read any of his previous novels will know, Arnott has an astonishing facility with language, and his prose imbues the Tasmanian wilderness with an extraordinary, immanent beauty." He found that "Dusk is a book about love: not just the love between the twins but the love they feel for the landscape and, surprisingly, for their dead parents."

== Publication history ==
After the novel's initial publication by Picador it was reprinted as follows:

- 2025 Vintage Books, UK
- 2025 Astra Publishing, USA

== Awards ==
- 2025 Indie Book Awards Book of the Year – Fiction, winner
- 2025 Indie Book Awards Book of the Year – Book of the Year, winner
- 2025 ARA Historical Novel Prize for Adults, joint winner

== See also ==
- 2024 in Australian literature
