= James Gumm =

Australian pioneer

James Gumm was a member of John Batman's party that was involved in the foundation of the city that became Melbourne. While travelling up Salt Water River as part of Batman's party Gumm obtained fresh water by making "a hole with a stick which He did about 2 feet deep and in less then [sic] One hour we had a plentiful supply of good soft water". The place was named Gumm's Well in his honour. A bend of the Maribyrnong River near Keilor was also named after him, but this name is no longer in use.

Gumm was left at Indented Head while John Batman returned to Launceston to prepare a larger expedition. He was left with three months' worth supplies with five other men named Dodd; Thompson; and three Sydney Aboriginals Bullet, Bungett, and Old Bull. Batman put Gumm in charge of setting up the small settlement and gardens. While waiting for Batman to return on 6 July 1835 William Buckley appeared at the camp site of John Batman's Port Phillip Association with a party of aboriginals wearing kangaroo skins and carrying Aboriginal weapons.
