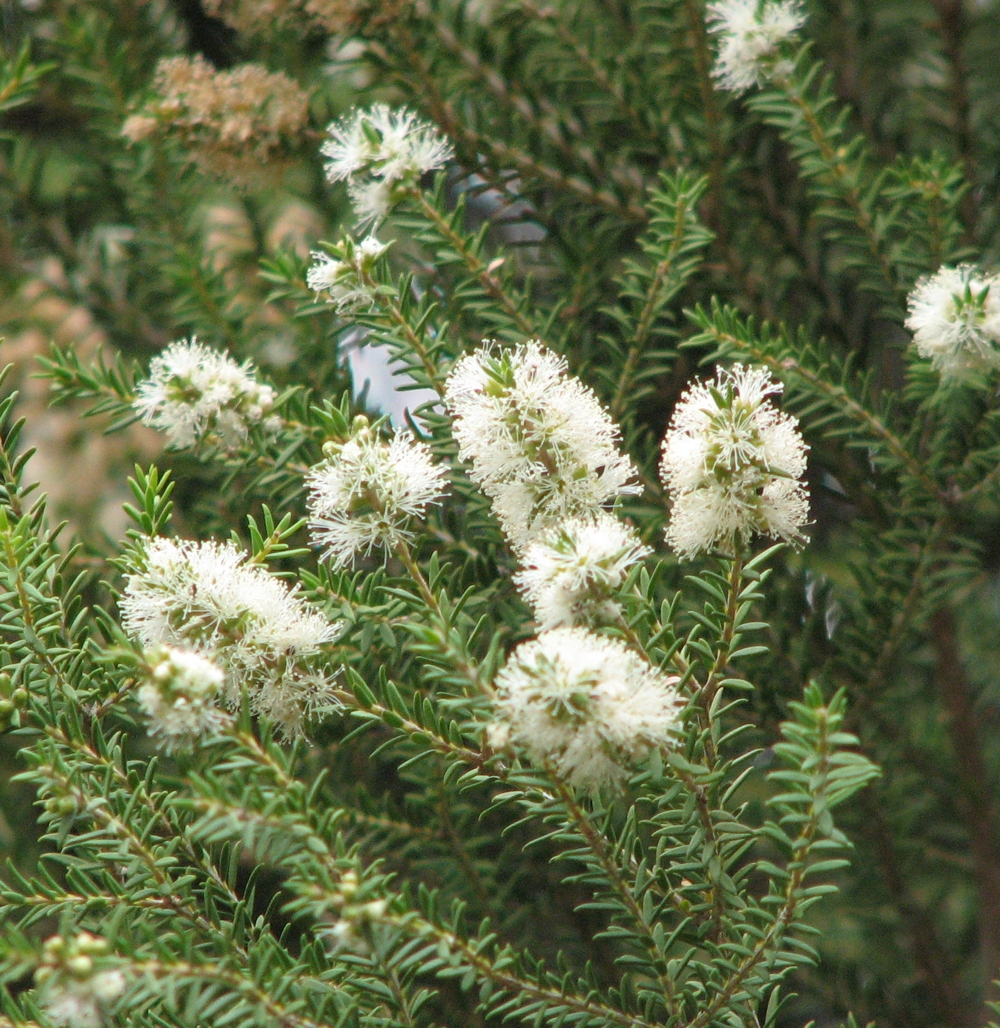
- In Maranoa Gardens

Conservation status
- Least Concern (IUCN 3.1)

Scientific classification
- Kingdom: Plantae
- Clade: Tracheophytes
- Clade: Angiosperms
- Clade: Eudicots
- Clade: Rosids
- Order: Myrtales
- Family: Myrtaceae
- Genus: Melaleuca
- Species: M. lanceolata

Binomial name
- Melaleuca lanceolata Otto
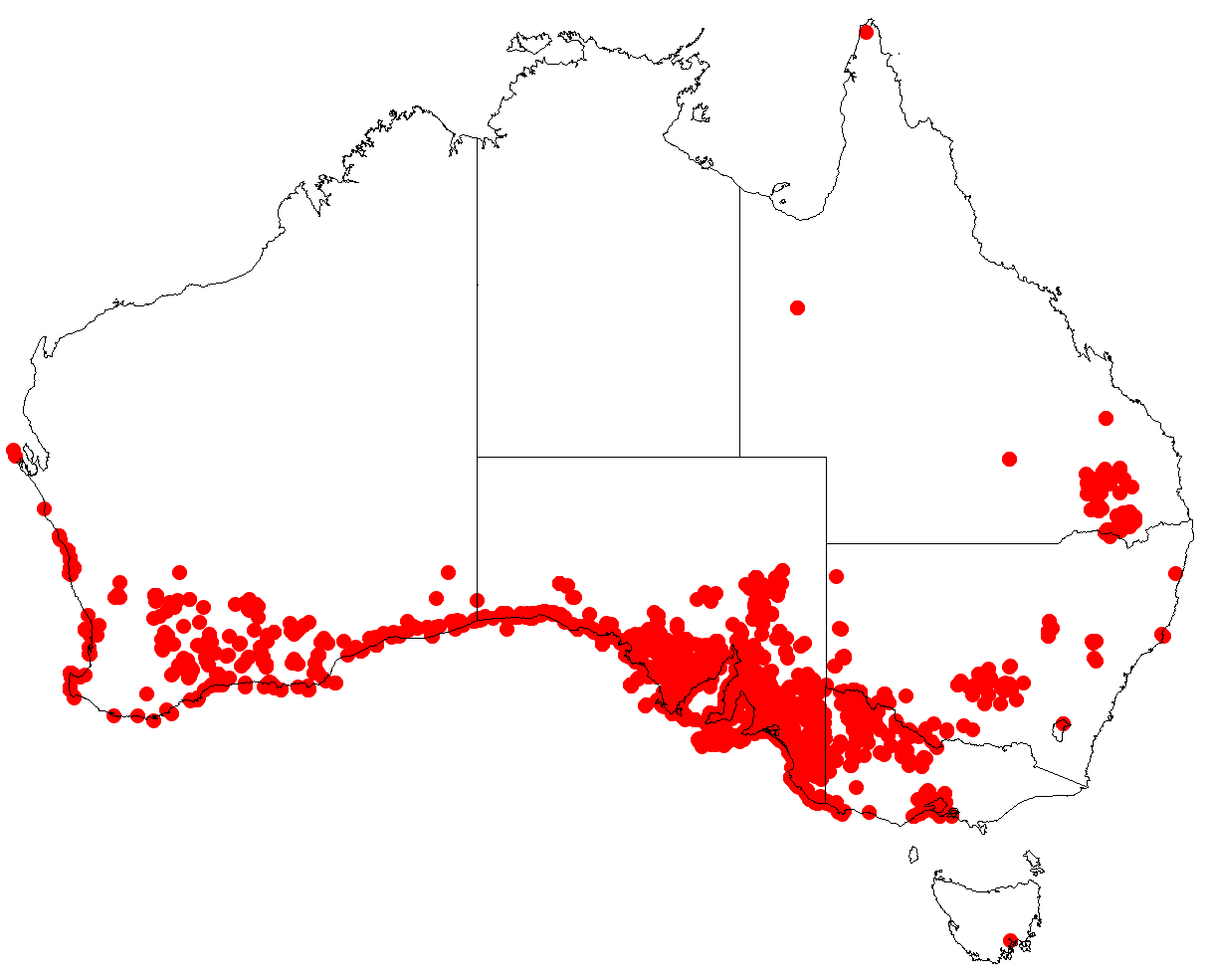
- Collections data for M. lanceolata from the Australasian Virtual Herbarium

Synonyms
- Melaleuca lanceolata subsp. occidentalis Barlow; Melaleuca lanceolata subsp. planifolia Barlow; Melaleuca lanceolata subsp. thaeroides Barlow

= Melaleuca lanceolata =

Black paperbark

Species of plant

Melaleuca lanceolata commonly known as black paperbark, moonah, Rottnest Island teatree and western black tea tree is a plant in the myrtle family, Myrtaceae and is native to Australia where it occurs in Western Australia, South Australia, Victoria, New South Wales and Queensland. It is a densely foliaged tree with rough bark, which flowers prolifically in summer.

== Description ==
Melaleuca lanceolata is a large shrub or small tree growing up to 10 m (30 ft) tall, with rough, dark grey bark on a trunk that is often twisted and bent by the effects of wind. Its branchlets and leaves are covered with soft, silky hairs when young but become glabrous as they mature. The leaves are arranged alternately, 3.1–12.5 mm (0.1–0.5 in) long, 0.7–1.9 mm (0.03–0.07 in) wide, linear to narrow elliptic in shape with a concave upper surface.

The flowers are white or cream-coloured and arranged in spikes on the ends of branches which continue to grow after flowering, sometimes also in the upper leaf axils. The spikes are up to 60 mm (2 in) long, 23 mm (0.9 in) in diameter and contain 3 to 12 groups of flowers in threes. The petals are 1.5–3 mm (0.06–0.1 in) long and fall off as the flower ages. The stamens are arranged in five bundles around the flowers with 7 to 20 stamens per bundle. The flowering season is mainly in summer but flowers may also appear randomly through the year. The fruit that follow are smooth, almost spherical woody capsules 3–7.5 mm (0.1–0.3 in) long that are spaced along the branches.

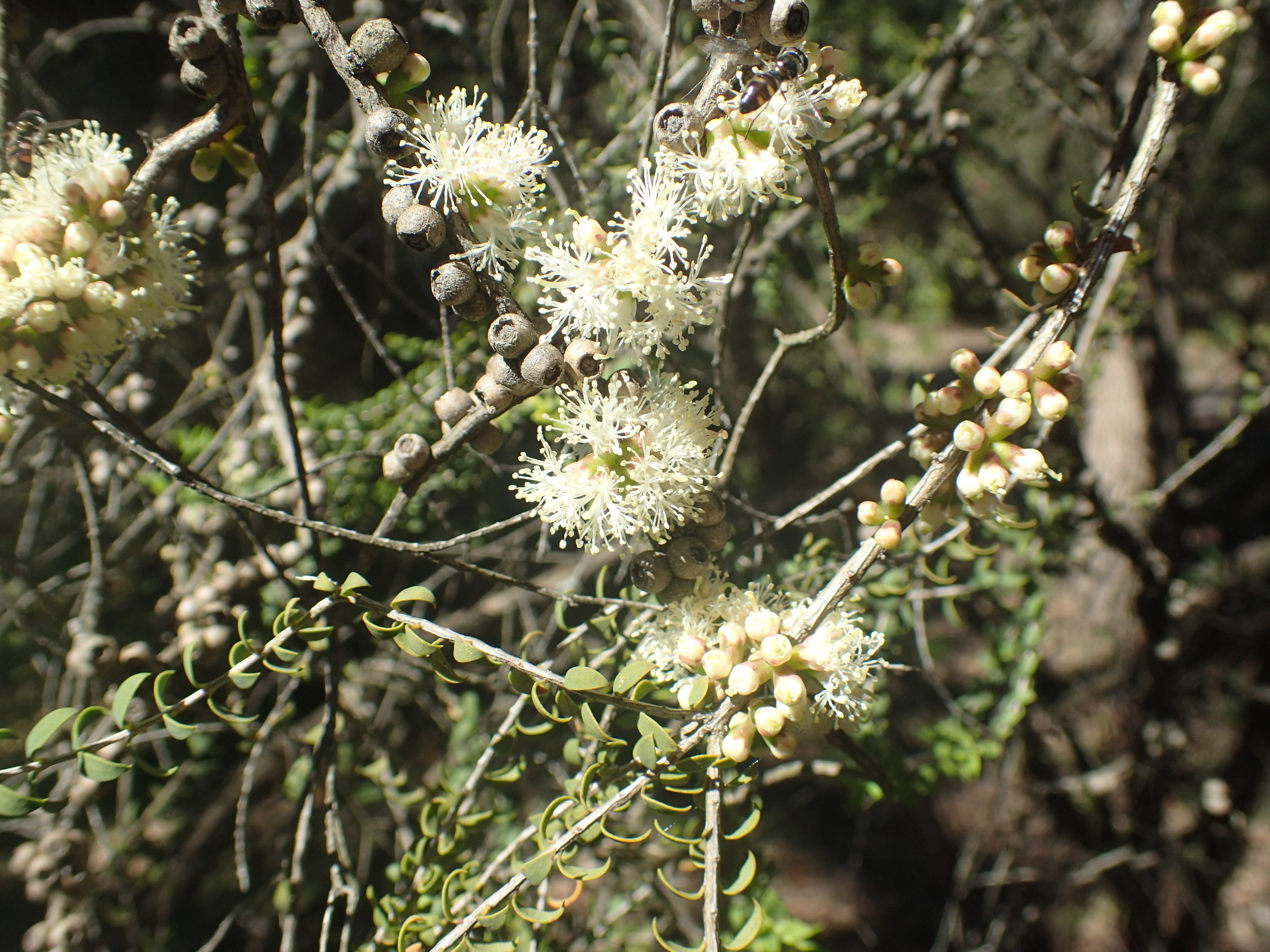
Leaves, flowers and fruit in the ANBG

== Taxonomy and naming ==
Melaleuca lanceolata was first formally described in 1820 by Christoph Friedrich Otto in Horae Physicae Berolinensis. The specific epithet (lanceolata) is a Latin word meaning "lancelike", referring to the shape of the leaves. It is one of 300 species of Melaleuca, all of which originated in Australia and southeast Asia.

Four subspecies have been proposed for M. lanceolata - lanceolata, occidentalis, planifolia and thaeroides but Lyndley Craven suggested that "until the morphological and geographic limits of the morphs are more fully known, the complex is best treated as a single taxon". The four subspecies are recognised by the World Checklist of Selected Plant Families.

== Distribution and habitat ==
Melaleuca lanceolata occurs in Western Australia, South Australia, Victoria, New South Wales and Queensland in mallee or open woodland. In Western Australia it is sometimes a garden escapee and has become established in bushland outside of its natural range. It is common on coastal dunes and cliffs but also inland where it grows near creeks and rivers.

Outside of Australia, it exists as a cultivated species in Israel's Jerusalem Botanical Gardens, and has proven its sturdiness as a landscaping element in both central and northern Israel.

== Ecology ==
This melaleuca attracts insects and birds which feed on its nectar.

== Conservation status ==
This species is classified as not threatened by the Government of Western Australia Department of Parks and Wildlife.

== Uses ==
=== Indigenous uses ===
Indigenous people have traditionally used the fibre and bark from the tree for making clothing and swaddling cloths for babies.

=== Horticulture ===
This is a free-flowering shrub or tree and is useful as an ornamental or maintenance free street tree. It is suitable as a screen or hedge. It is hardy, resistant to salt spray and suited to most soils but needs full sun to reach its potential.

=== Agriculture ===
Moonah makes an excellent windbreak or shelterbelt or shade for stock. It is good for fence posts and the flowers are attractive to wildlife. The pollen has value in beekeeping.
