= Heather Rose =

Australian author

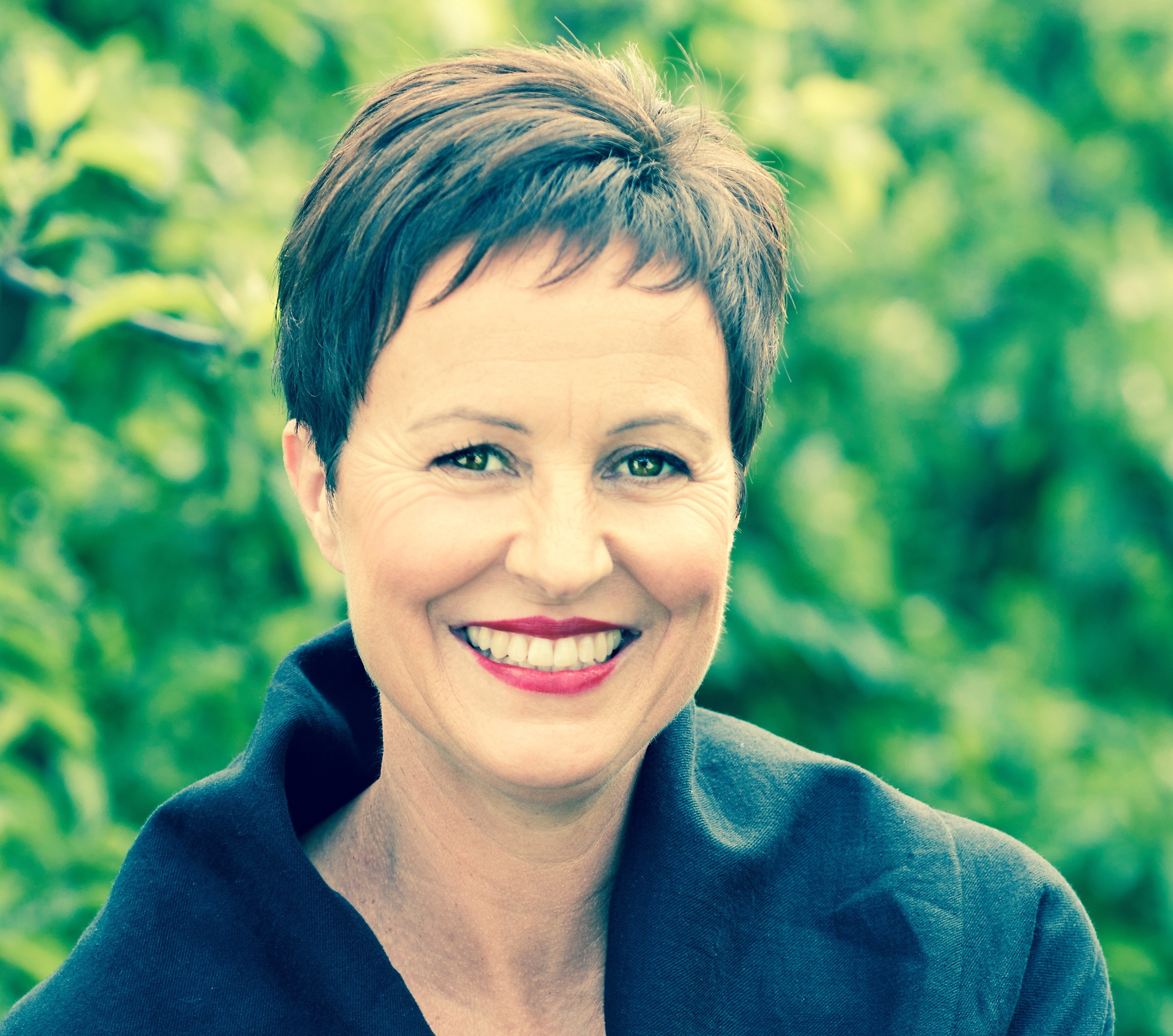
- Born: Heather Rose; 1964 (age 61–62); Hobart, Tasmania, Australia
- Occupation: Novelist
- Writing career
- Pen name: also wrote as Angelica Banks (author with Danielle Wood) for a series of children's novels published 2012 - 2016)
- Language: English
- Notable awards: Stella Prize; 2017 The Museum of Modern Love

Heather Rose (born 1964) is an Australian author born in Hobart, Tasmania. She is best known for her novels A Great Act of Love (2025/ 2026), The Museum of Modern Love, which won the 2017 Stella Prize and the Christina Stead Prize, and Bruny (2019), which won Best General Fiction in the 2020 Australian Book Industry Awards. In 2022 Rose published her memoir Nothing Bad Ever Happens Here. She has also worked in advertising, business, and the arts.

== Early life and education ==
Heather Rose was born in Hobart, Tasmania in 1964. By the age of sixteen she had a weekly column in the Hobart Mercury, and in 1981 won the Tasmanian Short Story Prize. She left school in 1982 and travelled widely through Asia and Europe. Returning to Australia in 1986, Rose became an advertising copywriter in Melbourne, until she returned to Tasmania 10 years later. Her first novel, White Heart, was published in 1999.

Apart from writing fiction, Rose has had an extensive career in advertising, business, and the arts.

== Writing career ==
=== Memoir ===
Rose's memoir, Nothing Bad Ever Happens Here, was published in November 2022. It has been widely reviewed and was shortlisted for the Indie Book Awards 2023.

=== Novels ===
Five of Rose's adult novels have been set in Tasmania – A Great Act of Love, Bruny, White Heart, The Butterfly Man, and The River Wife. The Museum of Modern Love is set in New York.

Rose's first adult novel, White Heart, was published in 1999 by Transworld. It tells the story of two children growing up in Tasmania. One of them becomes involved in the Native American ritual of sun dancing and the other becomes a Tasmanian tiger hunter. Murray Waldren in The Australian said: "Spirituality permeates Heather Rose's first novel, White Heart, as much as the past haunts it. This story is a complex of interwoven, sometimes chimeric themes...A-class debut."

Rose's second novel, The Butterfly Man, was published by UQP in 2005, It recounts the story of Lord Lucan the British Peer who disappeared from his family home in London after the murder of the family nanny in 1974. It is set in Hobart, Tasmania. The Butterfly Man won the Davitt Award for Crime Fiction Novel of the Year in 2006, was shortlisted for the Nita B Kibble Award, and longlisted for the International IMPAC Dublin Literary Award in 2007.

The River Wife, Rose's third novel for adults, was published in 2009 by Allen & Unwin and described as "a beautiful, modern fable about the price we pay for love – a magical and original novel". It is set in the central highlands of Tasmania and has received significant acclaim from reviewers and readers where it has been hailed for the beauty of its storytelling. An abridged version of The River Wife was broadcast on Radio National in 2010.

Rose has said of her first three novels: "I am passionately Tasmanian and my family has lived here many generations. I think of this book (The River Wife) as the third in a trilogy of books that dives into the Tasmanian landscape. The first—White Heart—is a sweeping view of the island told through the lens of childhood. The second—The Butterfly Man—dives closer into the seasons and landscape of Mt Wellington, the mountain that is the backdrop to Hobart. And The River Wife dives even more deeply into the central highlands, the very heart of Tasmania, and finds there a story, a myth, a fable that is uniquely Tasmanian. Perhaps it is no surprise that is it also a love story."

Rose's fourth adult novel, The Museum of Modern Love (2016), is set in New York and inspired by the performance artist Marina Abramović. It was published by Allen & Unwin in Australia in August 2016. The novel won the 2017 Stella Prize, the 2017 Christina Stead Prize for Fiction in the New South Wales Premier's Literary Awards and the 2017 Margaret Scott Prize and the People's Choice Award in the Tasmanian Premier's Literary Prizes. It was shortlisted for the Australian Literary Society Gold Medal and the Queensland Premier's Prizes. It was also long listed for the 2018 International Dublin Literary Award. The Museum of Modern Love was launched in the United States at the Museum of Modern Art (MoMA) in New York City, and has been translated into numerous languages.

Bruny (2019) has been described as "more a hand grenade than a book". A political satire, thriller, family saga and love story, Bruny is a prescient look at the new world order and the relationship between China and Australia. Bruny won the General Fiction Book of the Year in the Australian Book Industry Awards, and was shortlisted for the Independent Bookseller Awards for Fiction.

Rose's novel A Great Act of Love (2025) draws on the author's ancestry and the recorded history of Tasmania's first vineyards, established by Bartholemew Broughton on land subsequently bought by Captain Charles Swanston. The book received positive reviews, with critics praising its historical detail and character development. It was published in the UK and the United States in January 2026.

=== Children's novels ===
In 2013 Rose published her first children's novel Finding Serendipity co-authored with fellow award-winning writer Danielle Wood under the pen name Angelica Banks and published in Australia by Allen & Unwin. It has also been published in Germany by Magellan and in the United States with Henry Holt (Macmillan).

The second book in the Tuesday McGillycuddy series, A Week Without Tuesday, was published in Australian in 2015, in Germany in 2015 and in the United States in 2016. It was shortlisted for the 2015 Aurealis Awards for Best Children's Fantasy Novel.

The third book in the series, Blueberry Pancakes Forever, was published in Australia and Germany in 2016, and in the United States in 2017. It was shortlisted for the 2016 Aurealis Awards for Best Children's Fantasy Novel.

=== Other writing ===
Rose has also been published in several collections, including Some Girls Do edited by Jacinta Tynan (2007), Mosaic (2008) edited by Rosalind Bradley, and Dirty Words: A Literary Dictionary of Sex Terms (2008) edited by Ellen Sussman.

Rose has also had fiction and non-fiction, including reviews, published in Island magazine, Art & Australia, Art Monthly and Meanjin.

== Adaptations ==
The Museum of Modern Love has been optioned for film by multi-award-winning production team GoodThing Productions. In January 2022, the world premiere of a play adapted from The Museum of Modern Love by Tom Holloway was staged at the Sydney Festival.

== Business and the arts ==
In 1999, Rose co-founded an advertising agency, Coo'ee Tasmania, a member of the international Coo'ee Network across Europe, Australasia and the United States, with Rose as managing director. Growth of Coo'ee and the success of its campaigns led to Rose being named Telstra Tasmanian Business Woman of the Year 2004. Rose was chair of the Coo'ee Network of agencies across Australasia from 2005 to 2007.

In 2007 Coo'ee Tasmania left the Coo'ee Network and partnered with Green Team Global in New York. Green Team Australia became Australia's first "green" advertising agency specialising in community engagement. Green Team Australia has won over 25 international creative awards.

In 2008 Rose was appointed chair of the Festival of Voices, a Hobart-based arts festival celebrating song, music and the voice. Over the following three years she built the festival into one of the state's leading annual festivals.

The festival and Green Team Australia received both the Tasmanian and the national 2010 Australian Business Arts Foundation (ABAF) Award for SMEs, through a partnership created by Rose.

Rose has been an inaugural mentor in the Tasmanian Leaders Program, which trains business people in leadership excellence. Rose was a founding board member of the Macquarie Point Development Corporation from 2012 to 2016.

Rose was a trustee of the Tasmanian Museum and Art Gallery from 2020 to 2025.

== Awards and honours ==
=== Books ===
- 2025 – Shortlisted for Premier's Prize for Non-Fiction, Tasmanian Literary Awards, for Nothing Bad Ever Happens Here
- 2023 – Shortlisted for Nothing Bad Ever Happens Here for the Nonfiction prize, 2023 Indie Book Awards.
- 2020 – Winner, General fiction book of the year, for Bruny, Australian Book Industry Awards (ABIA)
- 2020 – Shortlisted for Bruny for the Davitt Award for best adult crime novel by Australian woman
- 2020 – Shortlisted for Bruny Booksellers Choice Awards
- 2020 – Shortlisted for the Bruny Indie Book Awards
- 2020 – Longlisted for Bruny NIB Literary Awards*
- 2018 – Longlisted for the International Dublin Literary Award for The Museum of Modern Love
- 2017 – Winner Tasmanian Premier's Literary Prizes - Margaret Scott Prize for best book by a Tasmanian author for The Museum of Modern Love
- 2017 – Shortlisted Queensland Literary Awards – Fiction for The Museum of Modern Love
- 2017 – Shortlisted for the Australian Literary Society Gold Medal The Museum of Modern Love
- 2017 – Winner the Christina Stead Prize for Fiction for The Museum of Modern Love
- 2017 – Winner the Stella Prize for The Museum of Modern Love
- 2016 – Shortlisted for the Aurealis Awards for Blueberry Pancakes Forever
- 2015 – Shortlisted for the Aurealis Awards for A Week Without Tuesday
- 2007 – Recipient of the Eleanor Dark Fellowship at Varuna, The Writers' House, to work on the then unpublished The River Wife
- 2007 – Longlisted for the IMPAC International Dublin Literary Award for The Butterfly Man
- 2006 – Shortlisted for Nita B Kibble Literary Award for Women Writers for The Butterfly Man
- 2006 – Winner, Davitt Award for Crime Novel of the year for The Butterfly Man

=== Other awards ===
- 2004 – Winner the Telstra Tasmanian Business Woman of the Year
- 2010 – Winner the national Australian Business Arts Foundation SME Award
- 2011 – Winner the national Australian Business Arts Foundation Woodside Better Business Award, for her extensive philanthropic contribution to Festival of Voices

== Selected bibliography ==
=== Adult novels ===
- White Heart (1999, Transworld Publishers)
- The Butterfly Man (2005, UQP)
- The River Wife (2009, Allen & Unwin)
- The Museum of Modern Love (2016, Allen & Unwin)
- Bruny (2019, Allen & Unwin)
- A Great Act of Love (2025, Allen & Unwin) (2026, Simon & Schuster, USA) (2026 John Murray, UK)

=== Children's novels ===
- Tuesday McGillycuddy series (as Angelica Banks, with Danielle Wood)
  - Finding Serendipity (2013, Allen & Unwin) (Magellan, Germany) (Henry Holt, USA)
  - A Week Without Tuesday (2015, Allen & Unwin) (Magellan, Germany) (Henry Holt, USA)
  - Blueberry Pancakes Forever (2016, Allen & Unwin) (Magellan, Germany) (Henry Holt, USA)

=== Memoir ===
- Nothing Bad Ever Happens Here (2022, Allen & Unwin)
