= Liz Winfield =

Australian poet

Liz Winfield (born 1964) is a contemporary Australian poet and editor.

== Biography ==
Liz Winfield was born in Hobart, Tasmania, in 1964 and attended Mount Carmel College. In 1999 she instigated the Republic Readings in Hobart and has coordinated them ever since. She is a poetry editor for Famous Reporter and the young persons' liaison officer for the Fellowship of Australian Writers' Tasmanian branch.

Winfield's collection Too Much Happens appeared from Cornford Press in 2003. Her second collection, Catalogue of Love – a chapbook from Walleah Press – was launched at the Tasmanian Poetry Festival in Launceston in October 2006.

== Awards ==
In 2010, she won the Norma and Colin Knight Poetry Award.

== Bibliography ==
- Too Much Happens (Cornford Press, 2003)
- Catalogue of Love (Walleah Press, 2006)
