= Tasmanian Literary Awards =

Australian literary award

The Tasmanian Premier's Literary Prizes are literary prizes that are awarded biennially in four categories by the Tasmanian Government. There are two panels of three judges: one for the book prizes, the other for the emerging writers and young writer's fellowship. In September 2021 the Tasmanian Government announced that the awards had been renamed the Tasmanian Literary Awards, would only be open to writers living in Tasmania. The six new categories are:

- fiction
- non-fiction
- young readers and children
- Indigenous writing
- poetry and short stories
- young writers fellowship

== Tasmania Book Prize winners ==
Awarded for the best book with Tasmanian content.

Year	Title	Author	Publisher
2007	In Tasmania: Adventures at the End of the World	Nicholas Shakespeare	Knopf
2009	Van Diemen's Land	James Boyce	Black Inc.
2011	Wanting	Richard Flanagan	Random House
2013	1835: The Founding of Melbourne and the Conquest of Australia	James Boyce	Black Inc.
2015	The Rise and Fall of Gunns Ltd	Quentin Beresford	New South Publishing
2017	Into the Heart of Tasmania: A Search for Human Antiquity	Rebe Taylor	Melbourne University Press
2019	Bridget Crack	Rachel Leary	Allen & Unwin

== Margaret Scott Prize winners ==
This prize, named in honour of well-known Tasmanian writer, Margaret Scott (1934–2005) is awarded for the best book by a Tasmanian author.

Year	Title	Author	Publisher
2007	Twilight of Love: Travels with Turgenev	Robert Dessaix	Picador
2009	Closing Hell's Gates: the Death of a Convict Station	Hamish Maxwell-Stewart	Allen & Unwin
2011	What Now, Tilda B?	Kathryn Lomer	University of Queensland Press
2013	The Roving Party	Rohan Wilson	Allen & Unwin
2015	The Narrow Road to the Deep North	Richard Flanagan	Random House Australia
2017	The Museum of Modern Love	Heather Rose	Allen & Unwin
2019	Flames	Robbie Arnott	Text

== University of Tasmania Prize winners ==
The first three awards were for best book by a Tasmanian publisher. Since 2013 the University of Tasmania Prize has been awarded for the best new unpublished literary work by an emerging Tasmanian writer.

Year	Title	Author	Details
2007	The Art of Apple Branding: Australian Apple Case Labels and the Industry Since 1788	Christopher Cowles and David Walker	Apples from Oz (Tasmanian publisher)
2009	Antarctic Eye: the Visual Journey	Lynne Andrews	Studio One (Tasmanian publisher)
2011	Postcards from the Asylum	Karen Knight	Pardalote Press (Tasmanian publisher)
2013	Kubla	Katherine Johnson	Unpublished emerging writer
2015	Soon	Lois Murphy	Unpublished emerging writer
2017	Brodsky Dies	Adam Ouston	Unpublished emerging writer
2019	The Signal Line	Brendan Colley	Unpublished emerging writer
2022	The Sand	Cameron Hindrum	Unpublished emerging writer

== Tasmanian Young Writer's Fellowship winners ==
Awarded to a young writer and sponsored by philanthropists. In its first year it was open to writers under 35, but for 2017 the age was lowered to under 30.

Year	Writer
2015	Robbie Arnott
2017	Erin Hortle
2019	Sam George-Allen
2022	Stephanie Jack
