= Where is the Green Sheep? =

Picture book written by Mem Fox and illustrated by Judy Horacek

- Front cover, designed by Judy Horacek
- Author: Mem Fox
- Illustrator: Judy Horacek
- Language: English
- Genre: Children's picture book
- Published: 2004 (Penguin Books)
- Publication place: Australia
- Media type: Print (hardcover)
- Pages: 32 (unpaginated)
- ISBN: 978-0-670-04149-7
- OCLC: 808652901

Where is the Green Sheep? is a children's picture book by Mem Fox and Judy Horacek. Published by Penguin Books, it depicts various coloured sheep in various activities, with the protagonist, the green sheep, not being seen until the final pages.

== Reception ==
Booklist wrote: "Little ones will bounce with anticipation as the simple yet clever text takes them to visit one sheep and then another. .. Laughs and interactive play will ensue among readers and listeners, alone or in groups". School Library Journal wrote: "Basic beginning vocabulary is repeated in this easy-to-read rhyme about different kinds of sheep. .. A welcome addition to the year's flock of easy-readers".

Kirkus Reviews called it "ideally easy and well-designed". Publishers Weekly wrote that "parents intrigued by Fox's ideas about early literacy (as expounded in Reading Magic, for example) will find this book a useful vehicle for putting her suggestions into practice". The Horn Book Magazine wrote: "And here's a book one doesn't see every day: a narrative perfectly attuned to a toddler's sense of playful discovery. .. Horacek's uncluttered watercolors merrily counterbalance the straightforward text and provide numerous opportunities for listeners to identify colors and animals as well as to count objects", and concluded "..this bedtime story is as satisfying as a goodnight kiss". January Magazine', in its review, wrote: "..this book is .. aimed squarely at children, though it is a surprise for those who know the artist's other work to see her mark on this book", and described it as "a joyous romp through the lives of sheep" and "a perfect book for bedtime reading with your toddler".

Where is The Green Sheep? appears on the School Library Journal Top 100 Picture Books List and the New York Public Library 100 Great Children's Books of the Last 100 Years list.

== Legacy ==
In August 2024, the Royal Australian Mint partnered with the Children’s Book Council of Australia to release collectable silver and gold-plated editions of a 20 cent coin to commemorate the 20th anniversary of the book's publication. A splash of green is presented on the coin, depicting the 'bed sheep' reading a book with a thought bubble including a trio of sheep.

== Awards and nominations ==
- 2004 Horn Book Fanfare Book
- 2005 Children's Book Council of Australia Book of the Year: Early Childhood - winner
- 2006 Kids Own Australian Literature Awards (KOALA) - Top 10
- 2007 KOALA - Top 10
- 2008 KOALA - Honour

== See also ==
- Good Night, Sleep Tight
- Ducks Away!
- Bonnie and Ben Rhyme Again
- Mem Fox
- Judy Horacek
