= List of female monsters in literature =

This is a list of female monsters in literature:

== Before 1900 ==
=== Antiquity (until fifth century AD) ===
- Greek mythology
  - Amphitrite, an oceanid or nereid and wife of Poseidon
  - Callirrhoe, an oceanid and wife of Poseidon
  - Doris, an oceanid and mother of the Nereids
  - Echidna, half-woman and half-snake
  - Electra, an oceanid and mother of the Harpies
  - Eurynome, an oceanid and the third wife of Zeus
  - The three Gorgon sisters (Medusa, Euryale, and Stheno), with hair made of venomous snakes, turn anyone who looks at them to stone
  - The Harpies, birds with the heads of women
  - Lamia, a child-eating, disfigured monster
  - Metis, an oceanid and first wife of Zeus
  - The Nereids, oceanids
  - Scylla and Charybdis, sea monsters living on opposite sides of a narrow strait
  - The Sirens, women combined with birds, whose songs lured sailors to wreck their ships
  - The Sphinx, the head of a woman and the body of a lion, said to have guarded the entrance to the city of Thebes
  - Styx, an oceanid and wife of Pallas

=== Middle Ages ===
- Beowulf (c. 700–1000): Grendel's mother, a monster-woman
- Prose Edda by Snorri Sturluson (c. 1220): The Valkyries, female creatures (often depicted as winged) of Norse mythology, who choose which fighters live and die in battle
- Roman de Mélusine by Jean d'Arras (1392–94): Mélusine, a water spirit of European folklore

=== Early modern period ===
- Paradise Lost by John Milton (1667): Sin, an allegorical character with the tail of a fish

=== Nineteenth century ===
- Frankenstein by Mary Shelley (1818): Female version of the creature created by Victor Frankenstein – he destroys it before it can be brought to life
- The Little Mermaid by Hans Christian Andersen (1837): The title character is a mermaid
- The Succubus by Honoré de Balzac (1837): A succubus disguised as a woman
- Carmilla by Sheridan Le Fanu (1871–2): Carmilla, a vampire who preys upon young women
- The Island of Doctor Moreau by H. G. Wells (1896): Half-finished puma-woman created by Dr Moreau, who eventually fights and kills him
- The Great God Pan by Arthur Machen (1894): Helen, the child of the character Mary and the Greek god Pan

== Twentieth century ==
=== 1950s ===
- The Lord of the Rings by J. R. R. Tolkien (1954): Shelob is a gigantic female spider

=== 1960s ===
- Dragonriders of Pern series by Anne McCaffrey (1967–2012): Ramoth and --Ruth--(note: Ruth is actually a male dragon), dragons
- Vampirella comic book series, created by Forrest J Ackerman (1969–83): Vampirella, a vampire

=== 1970s ===
- Lila the Werewolf by Peter S. Beagle (1974): Lila, a young female werewolf living in New York City

=== 1980s ===
- The Belgariad series by David Eddings (1982–4): Dryads, female human-like creatures, bound to oak trees
- Nights at the Circus by Angela Carter (1984): Fevvers, a circus performer claims to be part-swan
- Vampire Princess Miyu by Toshiki Hirano (1989–2002): Miyu, half-human and half-vampire

=== 1990s ===
- Tehanu and The Other Wind by Ursula K. Le Guin (1990, 2001): Tehanu, part-human and part-dragon
- Anita Blake: Vampire Hunter series by Laurell K. Hamilton (1993–present): Many female characters are vampires, shapeshifters, and other creatures. In the later books, Anita Blake becomes a succubus.
- Animorphs series by K. A. Applegate and Michael Grant (1996–2001): Rachel and Cassie, can transform into any animal they touch
- Aprilhäxan by Majgull Axelsson (1997): Desirée, 'the April witch', a shape-shifting monster

== Twenty-first century ==
=== 2000s ===
- Year of the Griffin by Diana Wynne Jones (2000): Elda, a griffin
- The Southern Vampire Mysteries series by Charlaine Harris (2001–13): Sookie Stackhouse, a faerie-human hybrid. Many other female characters are vampires, fae, shapeshifters, etc.
- Mermaid Melody Pichi Pichi Pitch manga series by Michiko Yokote (2002–5): Lucia, Hanon and Rina, mermaid princesses
- Emily Windsnap series by Liz Kessler (2003–15): Emily Windsnap, half-human and half-mermaid
- The Ingo Chronicles by Helen Dunmore (2005–12): Sapphire, half-human and half-mermaid
- Twilight series by Stephenie Meyer (2005–8): Several female characters are vampires and one is a werewolf. Bella becomes a vampire in the final book of the series.
- Bone Song by John Meaney (2007): Laura Steele, a benevolent zombie woman.
- The Shifters series by Rachel Vincent (2007–10): Faythe Sanders, a werecat
- The Story of GROWL by Judy Horacek (2007): Growl, a young female monster
- Vampire Academy series by Richelle Mead (2007–10): Lissa, Jill and Rose, vampires
- The Host by Stephenie Meyer (2008): Wanderer, a female parasitic alien implanted into the body of a human woman
- Faery Rebels series by R. J. Anderson (2009–11): Knife, Linden and Rhosmari (among others), faeries
- Fire by Kristin Cashore (2009): Lady Fire, a 'human monster'
- Soul Screamer series by Rachel Vincent (2009–13): Kaylee and Nash, banshees
- The Parasol Protectorate and Finishing School series by Gail Carriger (2009–15): Sidheag Maccon, a werewolf
- Percy Jackson and the Olympians: Books 1-5 Annabeth Chase
- Percy Jackson and the Olympians: Books 1-5 Rachel Elizabeth Dare
- Percy Jackson and the Olympians: Books 1-5 Zoë Nightshade
- Percy Jackson and the Olympians: Books 1-5 Sally Jackson
- Percy Jackson and the Olympians: Books 1-5 Thalia Grace
- Percy Jackson and the Olympians: Books 1-5 Silena Beauregaurd
- [[Percy Jackson and the Olympians: Books 1-5 Editor Note; This list from PJO is not including the female gods from the series. :>]] Bianca Di Angelo
- Percy Jackson and the Olympians: Books 1-5 Clarisse La Rue

=== 2010s ===
- iZOMBIE comic book series by Chris Roberson (2010–12): Gwen, a revenant or zombie
- A Centaur's Life manga series by Kei Murayama (2011–present): Himeno, a centaur
- Miss Peregrine's Home for Peculiar Children by Ransom Riggs (2011): Claire has a second mouth in the back of her head, and the Ymbrynes can shape-shift into birds
- Monster Musume manga series by Okayado (2012–present): Many of the female characters are mermaids, centaurs, etc.
- Seraphina by Rachel Hartman (2012): Seraphina, half-dragon, half-human
- The Girl with All the Gifts by M. R. Carey (2014): Melanie, infected with a zombie virus
- Talon series by Julie Kagawa (2014): Ember, a dragon hiding in human form
- Interviews with Monster Girls manga series by Petos (2015–present): Hikari (a vampire), Kyōko (a dullahan), Yuki (a snow woman), and Sakie (a succubus)
- Lorali series by Laura Dockrill (2015–17): Lorali and Aurabel, mermaids

== See also ==
- Monster literature
