= Hello Baby =

Hello Baby may refer to:

- Hello Baby (TV series), a South Korean reality show
- Hello Baby (1976 film), a Swedish drama film
- Hello Baby (2025 film), an Indian Telugu-language film
- "Hello Baby", a song by Sweet Robots Against the Machine from the compilation album Sushi 4004
- "Hello Baby", a 2014 song by NC.A

== See also ==
- Hello, Baby!, a 2009 children's picture book by Mem Fox
