= Hunwick's Egg =

2005 children's book by Mem Fox and Pamela Lofts

- Author: Mem Fox
- Illustrator: Pamela Lofts
- Language: English
- Genre: Adults picture book
- Published: 2005 (Penguin Books)
- Publication place: Australia
- Media type: Print (hardback)
- Pages: 32 (unpaginated)
- ISBN: 9780670042302
- OCLC: 224265719

Hunwick's Egg is a 2005 children's picture book by Mem Fox and illustrated by Pamela Lofts. It is about a bilby who finds an egg and after taking care of it comes to realise that is actually a rock, but continues to look after it just the same.

== Reception ==
Hunwick's Egg received mixed reviews with Kirkus Reviews calling it "a rare miss", and Publishers Weekly said that "despite the lovely vistas, the ending here may well be a letdown to readers".

Booklist was somewhat critical: "The abrupt conclusion is puzzling, and the layouts, featuring small inset scenes surrounded by creatures and plants set against white backgrounds, don't always make the most of Lofts' striking, detailed, colored-pencil art". The review concluded: "But children will easily be drawn to Lofts' astonishingly expressive animal characters, and Fox's gentle text may resonate with young ones who feel a magical connection or companionship with their own cherished rock, shell, or shred of blanket".

Hunwick's Egg has also been reviewed by the School Library Journal, Horn Book Guides, Library Media Connection, Bookseller+Publisher Review, and Magpies.
