= The Tiny Star =

Australian children's picture book by Mem Fox

- Author: Mem Fox
- Illustrator: Freya Blackwood
- Cover artist: Freya Blackwood
- Language: English
- Genre: Children's picture book
- Published: 2019 (Puffin Books)
- Publication place: Australia
- Media type: Print (hardback)
- Pages: 40 (unpaginated)
- ISBN: 9780670078127
- OCLC: 906797819

The Tiny Star is a 2019 children's picture book by Mem Fox and illustrated by Freya Blackwood. It is about a star falling to Earth, turning into a baby, living a loving fulfilling life, dying, than returning to the heavens as a star.

== Development ==
According to Fox, it took her five years to write.

== Publication history ==
- 2021, US, Alfred A. Knopf ISBN 9780593304013
- 2019, Australia, Puffin Books ISBN 9780670078127

== Reception ==
A reviewer for the Reading Time wrote "The Tiny Star is a valuable, uplifting and poignant story for the young to make sense of, and find comfort in, heartbreaking loss", and recommended it as a best book of the year. Publishers Weekly called it a "meditation".

The Tiny Star has also been reviewed by Kirkus Reviews, Books+Publishing, and StoryLinks.

== Awards ==
- 2020 Booksellers' Choice Children's book of the year shortlist
- 2020 Australian Book Industry Awards Children's Picture Book of the Year shortlist
- 2020 Speech Pathology Australia Book of the Year Awards Three to Five Years shortlist
- 2020 Australian Indie Book Awards Children's shortlist
