= This and That =

This and That may refer to:

- Questo e Quello, a 1983 Italian film
- This and That (album), a 1960 album by Pat Boone
- This & That (album), a 2004 album by Donnie Vie
- This & That (EP), a 2026 EP by Stray Kids
  - "This & That" (song), its title track
- This & That (Fox book), a 2015 book by Mem Fox and Judy Horacek
- This 'n That, a 1987 memoir written by Bette Davis with Michael Herskovitz
- "This 'n' That", a song by Silver Sun from their 1997 album Silver Sun

== See also ==
- This or That, an album by Sway & King Tech and DJ Revolution
- "This or That", a song by Reks from Rhythmatic Eternal King Supreme
