= Kerry Argent =

Australian illustrator (born 1960)

- Born: 1960 (age 65–66); Angaston, South Australia, Australia

Kerry Argent (born 1960) is an Australian illustrator of children's books.

== Life ==
Argent was born in Angaston in South Australia. She came to notice when she was part of the new wave of children's books published when Bob Hawke was the Prime Minister. After studying commercial art at TAFE, Argent went on to study graphic design at the South Australian School of Design. As part of her graduate course she illustrated a counting book written by her partner, artist and author Rod Trinca, called One Woolly Wombat. This book inspired a revival of Australian children's picture book literature and helped provide the publisher Omnibus Books with the finance needed to publish its second book: Possum Magic by Mem Fox. One Woolly Wombat has been the recipient of both international and national awards and was selected as the "Best Children's Book" in 1985, when it won a Whitley Award by the Royal Zoological Society of New South Wales.

Argent has illustrated several books by Australian children's writers Mem Fox, Thelma Catterwell and Margaret Wild. Her illustrations for Sofie Laguna's Too Loud Lily gained the Children's Book Council of Australia's Book of the Year award for early childhood in 2003.

In 2018 Dr Belle Alderman who is an Emeritus Professor of Children's Literature, and the director of the National Centre for Australian Children's Literature organised an exhibition at the University of Canberra of children's book illustrations. Artists included May Gibbs, Kylie Dunstan, Vivienne Goodman, Graeme Base, Bob Graham, Shaun Tan and Argent.

== Works ==
Year	Title	Author
1982	One Woolly Wombat	Rod Trinca
1985	Sebastian Lives in a Hat	Thelma Catterwell
1985	A Bush Birthday	Eleanor Nilsson
1987	Derek the Dinosaur	Mary Blackwood
1991	Thank you, Santa	Margaret Wild
1995	Gotcha!	Gail Jorgensen
1995	Wombat Divine	Mem Fox
1999	Sleepy Bears	Mem Fox
2000	Nighty Night	Margaret Wild
2002	Too Loud Lily	Sofie Laguna
2007	Ruby Roars	Margaret Wild
