= Guess What =

Guess What may refer to:

- Guess What (Canadian game show), a 1983–1987 Canadian game show that aired on CTV
- Guess What (U.S. game show), a 1952 American game show that aired on DuMont network
- "Guess What" (song), a song by Syleena Johnson
- Guess What? a 1990 picture book for children
- "Guess What?", an episode of the TV series Pocoyo
