= Where the Giant Sleeps =

Australian children's picture book by Mem Fox and Vladimir Radunsky

- Author: Mem Fox
- Illustrator: Vladimir Radunsky
- Cover artist: V. Radunsky
- Language: English
- Genre: Children's picture book
- Published: 2007 (Puffin Books)
- Publication place: Australia
- Media type: Print (hardback)
- Pages: 24 (unpaginated)
- ISBN: 9780670071739
- OCLC: 174101529

Where the Giant Sleeps is a 2007 children's picture book by Mem Fox and illustrated by Vladimir Radunsky. A bedtime book, it was published by Harcourt, Inc., and it is about a giant and the creatures that inhabit it sleeping and preparing for sleep as seen through a telescope by a child who, as it turns out, is dreaming.

== Reception ==
A brief review of Where the Giant Sleeps in The New York Times wrote: "A dreamlike landscape - houses, trees, hills and pastures - makes the form of a sleeping giant. Small readers will enjoy putting the details together, and Radunsky's gouache illustrations seem to glow with starlight". Kirkus Reviews wrote: "Casting dim moonlight over drowsy forms made with cloudy edges and soft colors, the artist expertly captures the poem’s tone and makes the slide down into dreamland well-nigh inevitable".

Where the Giant Sleeps has also been reviewed by the following publications: Publishers Weekly, Booklist, School Library Journal, Horn Book Guides, Library Media Connection, Magpies, and The Center for Children’s Literature.
