= Mem Fox =

Australian academic and children's writer

Mem Fox AM
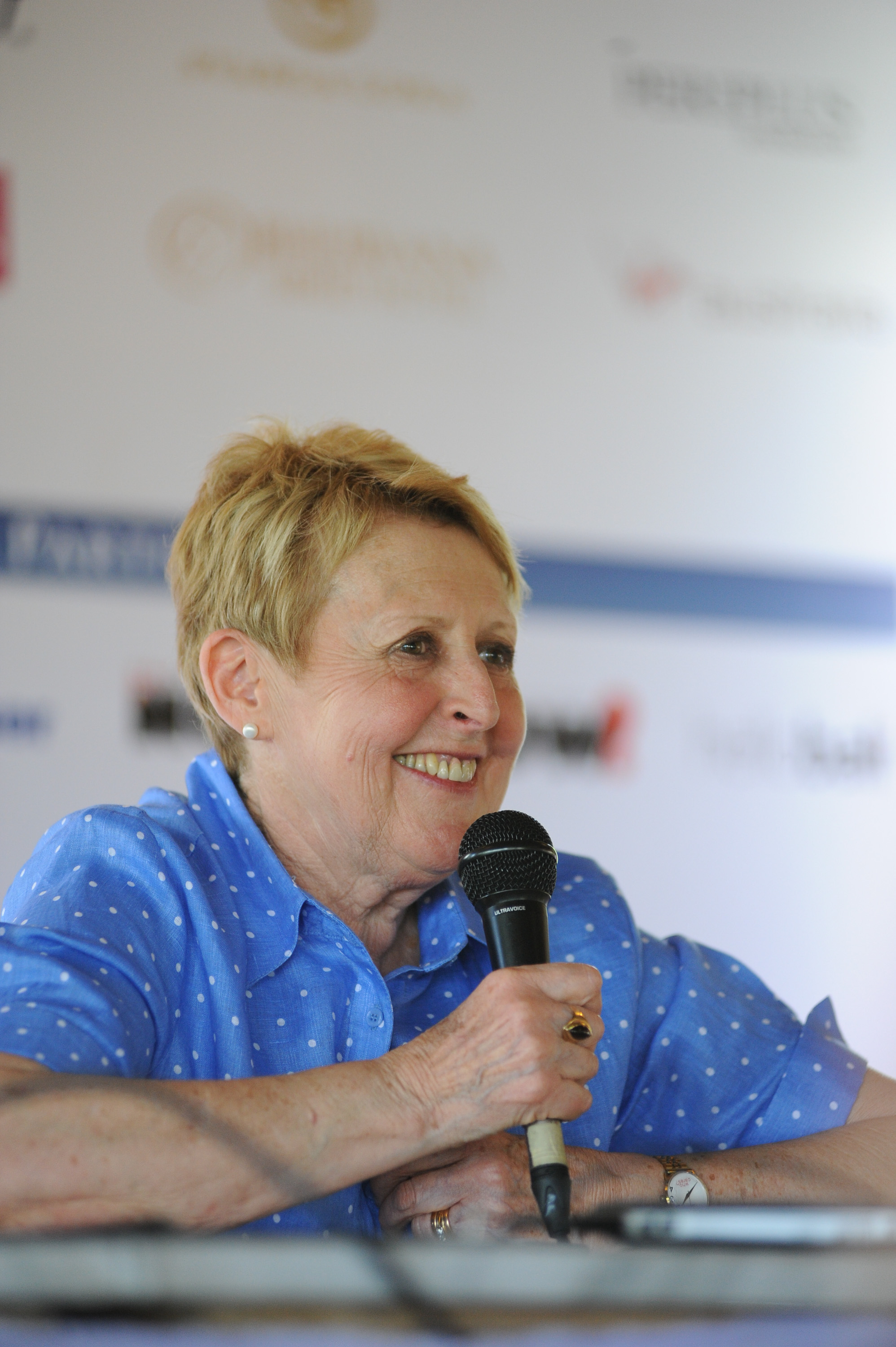
- Fox speaking to audience in 2014
- Born: Merrion Frances Partridge; 5 March 1946 (age 80); Melbourne, Victoria, Australia
- Education: Rose Bruford College; Flinders University
- Occupation: Author
- Writing career
- Pen name: "Mem" Fox
- Genre: Children's literature
- Notable work: Possum Magic
- Notable awards: Nan Chauncy Award, 2017

Merrion Frances "Mem" Fox AM (née Partridge; born 5 March 1946) is an Australian writer of children's books and an educationalist specialising in literacy. Fox has been semi-retired since 1996, but she still writes and gives seminars. She lives in Adelaide, South Australia.

== Early life and education ==
Merrion Frances Partridge was born in Melbourne on 5 March 1946 to Nancy and Wilfrid Gordon McDonald Partridge. In October, her parents left Australia to become teaching missionaries of Hope Fountain Mission in Rhodesia, and Partridge and her two sisters grew up and were educated in Africa. She was the only white child at the mission school. After authorities found out, she was forced to go to an all-white school and was teased for having an African accent. After graduating high school, she did volunteer work in a conference centre of the World Council of Churches near Geneva, Switzerland.

Partridge dreamed of pursuing a stage career. Her father reluctantly agreed to send her to an English drama school on the condition that she would attend Rose Bruford College in London, which also included a compulsory teaching degree. In 1965, she began three years at drama school and discovered that "she didn't really want to act, but she did want to be known." She also met fellow student Malcolm Fox. After marrying in 1969, they moved to Rwanda, then England and finally Adelaide, South Australia.

She later took a course in children's literature at Flinders University.

== Career ==
In Adelaide, Fox applied for a radio job at ABC. She only had irregular parts in radio plays and began teaching as she did not get paid enough money. By 1973, Fox had signed up to teach drama full-time at Sturt's Teachers University.

=== Possum Magic ===
When her daughter was seven, Fox decided to take a course in children's literature at Flinders University because of Chloe's love of reading. One of the assignments was to write a children's book, for which Fox wrote a story named Hush the Invisible Mouse. Her professor encouraged her to publish it, and it was illustrated by Julie Vivas, a student in the art department. It was rejected nine times over five years before Omnibus Books accepted it, but asked her to rewrite it more lyrically, cut two-thirds of the story and change the mice to possums.

In 1983, the book was published as Possum Magic. It follows Hush, a possum whose Grandma Poss turns her invisible to protect her from the bush. Now considered a classic in Australian children's literature, Possum Magic is Australia's bestselling children's book.

=== Literary career ===
In 1984, Fox's second book Wilfrid Gordon McDonald Partridge was published by Omnibus Books. It follows a boy who helps his elderly neighbour recover her lost memory through gifts. The title of the book was the name of her father.

The book Guess What? ranks number 66 on the American list of the 100 most-challenged books 1990 to 2000. Groups and agencies can challenge a book to prevent it from being available to be read by the general public. The book has now been banned in Duval County, Florida on accusations that the book contains pornographic material. The specific section that troubled censors involves the main character taking a bath.

=== Teaching career ===
In 1981, while working in drama, Fox decided to retrain in literacy studies. She said: "Literacy has become the great focus of my life – it's my passion, my battle and my mission and my exhaustion". She has published books on literacy aimed at children, their parents, teachers and educators. She held the position of Associate Professor, Literacy Studies, in the School of Education at Flinders University until her retirement in 1996. Since her retirement from teaching, Fox travels around the world visiting many countries and doing presentations and speaking on children's books and literacy issues. Following an interrogation by US immigration officials on a trip in February 2017 to deliver a keynote speech in Milwaukee, Fox said that she would probably never visit the US again.

== Personal life ==
Fox is married to teacher Malcolm Fox, who was convicted of child sexual abuse in 2011. Her daughter, Chloë Fox, is a former member of the South Australian House of Assembly. As she dislikes her given, legal name, Fox began using her nickname "Mem" at around thirteen years of age.

== Awards and recognition ==
- Won – New South Wales Premier's Literary Awards Ethel Turner Prize for young people's literature for Possum Magic (1984)
- Won – Dromkeen Medal (1990)
- Won – Member of the Order of Australia for "services to children's literature" (1993)
- Won – COOL Award for Possum Magic (1994)
- Won – Centenary Medal (2001)
- Honorary doctorates – Wollongong and Flinders Universities, Australia in 1996 and 2004
- Won – Lloyd O'Neil Award (2026)

== Works ==
=== Children's books ===
- Possum Magic (1983), illustrated by Julie Vivas
- Wilfrid Gordon McDonald Partridge (1984), illustrated by Julie Vivas
- A Cat called Kite (1985), illustrated by K. Hawley
- Zoo-Looking (1986), illustrated by Rodney McRae
- Arabella, the Smallest Girl in the World (1986), illustrated by Vicky Kitanov
- Hattie and the Fox (1986), illustrated by Patricia Mullins
- Just Like That (1986) with Kilmeny Niland
- Sail Away: The Ballad of Skip and Nell (1986), illustrated by Pamela Lofts
- The Straight Line Wonder (1987), illustrated by Meredith Thomas
- A Bedtime Story (1987), illustrated by Sisca Verwoert
- Goodnight Sleep Tight (1988), illustrated by Helen Semmler
- Guess What? (1988) with Vivienne Goodman
- Koala Lou (1988), illustrated by Pamela Lofts
- With Love at Christmas (1988), illustrated by Fay Plamka
- Night Noises (1989), illustrated by Terry Denton
- Feathers and Fools (1989), illustrated by Lorraine Ellis
- Shoes from Grandpa (1989), illustrated by Patricia Mullins
- Sophie (1989), illustrated by Craig Smith
- Time for Bed (1993), illustrated by Jane Dyer
- Tough Boris (1994), illustrated by Kathryn Brown
- Wombat Divine (1995), illustrated by Kerry Argent
- A Bedtime Story (1996), illustrated by Elivia Savadier
- Boo to a Goose (1996), illustrated by David Miller
- Whoever You Are (1997), illustrated by Leslie Staub
- Sleepy Bears (1999), illustrated by Kerry Argent
- Harriet, You'll Drive Me Wild! (2000), illustrated by Marla Frazee
- The Magic Hat (2002), illustrated by Tricia Tusa
- Where is the Green Sheep? (2004), illustrated by Judy Horacek
- Hunwick's Egg (2005), illustrated by Pamela Lofts
- A Particular Cow (2006), illustrated by Terry Denton
- Where the Giant Sleeps (2007), pictures by Vladimir Radunsky
- Ten Little Fingers and Ten Little Toes (2008), illustrated by Helen Oxenbury
- The Goblin and the Empty Chair (2009), illustrated by Leo and Diane Dillon
- Hello, Baby! (2009), illustrated by Steve Jenkins
- A Giraffe in the Bath (March 2010) with Olivia Rawson, illustrated by Kerry Argent
- Let's Count Goats! (October 2010), illustrated by Jan Thomas
- The Little Dragon (April 2011), illustrated by Roland Harvey
- Two Little Monkeys (May 2012), illustrated by Jill Barton
- Tell Me About Your Day Today (2012), illustrated by Lauren Stringer
- Good Night, Sleep Tight (2012), illustrated by Judy Horacek
- Yoo-hoo, Ladybird! (2013), illustrated by Laura Ljungkvist
- Baby Bedtime (2013), illustrated by Emma Quay
- Nellie Belle (2015), illustrated by Mike Austin
- This & That (2015), illustrated by Judy Horacek
- Ducks Away! (2016), illustrated by Judy Horacek
- I'm Australian Too (2017), illustrated by Ronojoy Ghosh
- Bonnie and Ben Rhyme Again (October 2018), illustrated by Judy Horacek
- The Tiny Star (2019), illustrated by Freya Blackwood
- Early One Morning (2021), illustrated by Christine Davenier
- Cat Dog (2021), illustrated by Mark Teague
- Meerkat Mayhem (2024), illustrated by Judy Horacek

=== Non-fiction ===
- Thereby Hangs a Tale (1980)
- How to Teach Drama to Infants Without Really Crying (Australian title) (1984) (Teaching Drama to Young Children (USA title) (1987))
- Mem's the Word (1990 – Australian title) (Dear Mem Fox (1992 – USA title)
- English Essentials: The Wouldn't-Be-Without-It Guide To Writing Well (1993 and 2009) with Lyn Wilkinson
- Memories: An Autobiography (1992)
- Radical Reflections: Passionate Opinions on Teaching, Learning, and Living (1993)
- Reading Magic: How Your Child Can Learn to Read Before School - and Other Read-aloud Miracles (2001)

== Sources ==
- Fox, Mem (1992). Dear Mem Fox, I Have Read All Your Books Even the Pathetic Ones And Other Incidents in the Life of a Children's Book Author. Harcourt Brace Jovanovich. ISBN 9780156586764.
