= Time for Bed (Fox book) =

1993 Children's picture book by Mem Fox

- Author: Mem Fox
- Illustrator: Jane Dyer
- Language: English
- Genre: Children's picture book, poetry
- Published: 1993 (Omnibus Books)
- Publication place: Australia
- Media type: Print (hardback)
- Pages: 26 (unpaginated)
- ISBN: 9781862911864
- OCLC: 861531001

Time for Bed is a 1993 children's picture book by Mem Fox. It is about various baby animals getting ready for bed with gentle encouragement from their parents; finally a human mother tucks in her child.

== Reception ==
Booklist wrote: "Although the rhyme at times limps rather than lilts, there's a warmth to this that makes the whole more than the sum of its parts. Of course, one of the important parts is the art". School Library Journal wrote: "Charming illustrations and comfortable rhymes characterize this appealing bedtime book".

It has also been reviewed by Kirkus Reviews, Publishers Weekly, and Common Sense Media.

It appears on The Daily Telegraph's 100 best children's books of all-time list.

== See also ==
- Sleepy Bears - another bedtime book by Mem Fox
