= Nellie Belle =

Australian children's picture book by Mem Fox and illustrated by Mike Austin

- Author: Mem Fox
- Illustrator: Mike Austin
- Cover artist: Mike Austin
- Language: English
- Genre: Children's picture book
- Published: 2015 (Scholastic)
- Publication place: Australia
- Media type: Print (hardback)
- Pages: 32 (unpaginated)
- ISBN: 9781760274108
- OCLC: 1080159938

Nellie Belle is a 2015 children's picture book by Mem Fox and illustrated by Mike Austin. It is about a dog called Nellie Belle who escapes from her yard and has some adventures in her beachside town before being scared by some possums in a park and returning home.

== Reception ==
Kirkus Reviews, on reviewing Nellie Belle, wrote: "Sunny, reassuring fare for recent graduates from toddlerdom itching to leave safe harbors (for a time, at least) to check out new horizons of their own". Publishers Weekly found it "an energetic, romping story from start to finish, yet counterbalanced by the soothing repetitions and rhythms of Fox’s verse".

Nellie Belle has also been reviewed by the following magazines: Booklist, School Library Journal, Horn Book Guides, and Magpies.
