= Baby Bedtime =

Australian children's picture book by Mem Fox

- Author: Mem Fox
- Illustrator: Emma Quay
- Language: English
- Genre: Children's picture book
- Published: 2013 (Penguin Books Australia)
- Publication place: Australia
- Media type: Print (hardback)
- Pages: 32 (unpaginated)
- ISBN: 9780670075195
- OCLC: 863243814

Baby Bedtime is a 2013 children's picture book by Mem Fox and illustrated by Emma Quay. The book, published in America by Beach Lane Books, and published in Australia by Penguin Books Australia, is about an adult elephant getting her baby ready for bed.

== Publication history ==
- 2014, USA, Beach Lane Books ISBN 9781481420976
- There Comes A Time For Sleeping, 2013, England, Penguin Books ISBN 9780670075195
- 2013, Australia, Penguin Books Australia ISBN 9780670075195

== Reception ==
Reviews of Baby Bedtime have been mixed. A Kirkus Reviews reviewer was especially concerned with the book's initial wording and wrote that "the cannibalistic opening quatrain followed by a gushingly affectionate outpouring makes for a book that only a certain type of grandparent could read aloud to a very young grandchild. Quay's striking illustrations cannot rescue this one". Publishers Weekly wrote: "Here's a wonderful little lesson in the subjunctive from master teacher Fox (Ten Little Fingers and Ten Little Toes). ... After a few pages of soft-crayoned textures, pastel hues, and arm's-length framing, a visual sameness sets in, though readers should find it soporific".

There have also been Baby Bedtime reviews in Booklist, School Library Journal, The Horn Book Magazine, The Bulletin of the Center for Children's Books, Reading Time, Scan, and Magpies.

== Awards ==
- 2015 CCBC Choices book
- 2014 CBCA Book of the Year: Early Childhood shortlist
- 2014 CBCA Picture Book of the Year notable book
- 2014 Speech Pathology Australia Book of the Year Awards, Birth to three years shortlist
- 2014 Western Australian Premier's Book Awards shortlist
