= Pamela Lofts =

Australian artist (1949–2012)

- Born: August 9, 1949
- Died: July 4, 2012 (aged 62)
- Other name: Pam Lofts
- Occupations: Children's book illustrator, artist

Pamela Lofts (9 August 1949 – 4 July 2012), also known as Pam Lofts, was an Australian children's book illustrator and exhibiting artist based in Alice Springs in the Northern Territory of Australia. She is best remembered as the illustrator of the Australian classic children's books, Wombat Stew by Marcia Vaughan and Koala Lou by Mem Fox. Although known for her book illustrations, she was also a photographer, painter, and sculptor.

== Biography ==
Lofts was one of two children born to Dorothy and Rory Lofts.

Lofts first moved to Alice Springs in 1980. In response to a lack of contemporary arts activity in Alice Springs, she and four other local artists, established an artists-run initiative called Watch This Space in 1993. Lofts became its first coordinator.

During the 1980s, Lofts illustrated some of Australia's best known children's books, including Marcia Vaughan's Wombat Stew in 1985 which has been widely translated and inspired a series of children's road safety posters in New South Wales. It has also been voted the most popular book in the children's book awards' KOALA Hall of Fame with 13 nominations. She also worked closely with children's author Mem Fox, illustrating Koala Lou, Hunwick's Egg and Sail Away: The Ballad of Skip and Nell.

Lofts was a successful exhibiting artist in the mediums of drawing, painting and performance who had 27 solo shows across Australia from 1992 to 2002 and was also represented in almost 70 group exhibitions including four Togart Contemporary Art Award exhibitions. She was also visiting artist at the Australian National University's National Institute for the Arts in 2002. Her work is held in the collection of Araluen Arts Centre.

Lofts died 4 July 2012, having had Motor Neuron Disease for two years.

== Legacy ==
Following her death Lofts made a bequest to the Indigenous Literacy Foundation (ILF), which is funded by the royalties from her books, and this bequest has already resulted in The Yirara Mix Book, written and illustrated by students of Yirara College in Alice Springs. Also using the bequest, the ILF has been able to create the Pamela Lofts Bequest Workshop, which flies young Indigenous creatives from remote areas in Western Australia and the Northern Territory to Sydney, for a week-long art workshop.

Watch This Space's annual Lofty Awards, which recognise an individual's contribution to the arts in Alice Springs ("The Pam Lofts Award for High Endeavour in Central Australian Contemporary Art"), are named after her.

Institutions that hold ephemera relating to Lofts include the State Library of Victoria, and the Art Gallery of NSW.

== Selected works ==
=== Books ===
- Wombat Stew by Marcia Vaughan (1984) - illustrator ISBN 9780868962580
- An Aboriginal Story series (1980s) -
  - How the birds got their colours told by Mary Albert (1983) - compiled by ISBN 9780868962641
  - How the kangaroos got their tails told by George Mung Mung Lirrmiyarri (1983) - compiled by ISBN 9781865046259
  - Dunbi the owl told by Daisy Utemorrah (1983) - compiled by ISBN 9780868962658
  - The echidna and the shade tree told by Mona Green (1984) - retold and illustrated by ISBN 9780868962665
  - When the snake bites the sun told by David Mowaljarlai (1984) - compiled by ISBN 9780868962672
  - Warnayarra the Rainbow Snake: an Aboriginal story told by the Senior Boys Class, Lajamanu School (1987) - compiled by ISBN 9780868963211
  - The kangaroo and the porpoise: an Aboriginal story told by Agnes Lippo (1987) - compiled by ISBN 9780868963280
  - The bat and the crocodile: an Aboriginal story told by Jacko Dolumyu and Hector Jandany (1987) - compiled by ISBN 9780868963266
- Sail Away: The Ballad of Skip and Nell by Mem Fox (1986) - illustrator ISBN 9780868963556
- Koala Lou by Mem Fox (1988) - illustrator ISBN 9780140540635
- Yarrtji: Six Women's Stories from the Great Sandy Desert (1997) by Tjama Freda Nappanangka, Payi Payi Napangarti, Martingale Mudgedel Napanangka, Kuninyi Rita Nampitjin, Nanyuma Rosie Napurrula, Millie Skeen Nampitjin; compiled and edited by Sonja Peter; translations by Tjama Freda Napanangka, Patricia Lee Napangarti - compiled and edited by ISBN 9780855752606
- Hunwick's Egg by Mem Fox (2005) - illustrator ISBN 9780670042302

=== Artwork ===
Lofts' work is held in the following permanent collections:

- Araluen Arts Centre (Mightbe Somewhere),
- National Centre for Australian Children's Literature (illustrations related to the book Hunwick's Egg), (illustrations related to the book Koala Lou), (illustrations related to the book Sail Away),

Her (created with Pip McManus) sculpture Storyleaves is displayed in the Public Art Precinct, Alice Springs Airport.

== Awards ==
- 2005 Kids Own Australian Literature Awards (KOALA) - Picture Book shortlist for Hunwick's Egg,
- 2004 Young Australian Best Book Awards (YABBA) for Wombat Stew,
- 1998 New South Wales Premier's History Prize - General History Prize shortlist for Yarrtji: Six Women's Stories from the Great Sandy Desert,

== Exhibitions ==
- Obscured by Light (2012), Araluen Arts Centre
- Old Stories Our Stories Now Stories (2021, 2022), Araluen Arts Centre
- Groundrush (group) (2018), Canberra Contemporary Art Space, Gorman Arts Centre
