= Wilfrid Gordon McDonald Partridge =

1984 Children's picture book by Mem Fox

- First edition
- Author: Mem Fox
- Illustrator: Julie Vivas
- Language: English
- Genre: Children's picture book, poetry
- Published: 1984 (Omnibus Books)
- Publication place: Australia
- Media type: Print (hardback)
- Pages: 32 (unpaginated)
- ISBN: 9780949641168
- OCLC: 19618469

Wilfrid Gordon McDonald Partridge is a 1984 children's picture book by Mem Fox. The book is about a boy, Wilfrid, who helps an elderly friend, Nancy, to regain some of her memory. In 1998, American company Weston Woods Studio released a film adaptation of this book, narrated by the author with music by Ernest Troost.

== Basis ==
The name of the boy who is the central character is that of Fox's father, Wilfrid Gordon McDonald Partridge, who, with his wife, Nancy, was sent to Zimbabwe as a teaching missionary.

== Reception ==
School Library Journal wrote: "The illustrations – splashy, slightly hazy watercolors in rosy pastels – contrast the boy's fidgety energy with his friends' slow, careful movements and capture the story's warmth and sentiment". Alzheimer's Australia found it "sensitively written". A review by the NYU Langone Medical Center called it "a magnificently written and illustrated story about communication".

Fox herself has noted the politically loaded aspects of the story, in having a white hero, separating the elderly from their families, and having a focus on nuclear families.
