= Yoo-hoo, Ladybird! =

Australian children's picture book by Mem Fox and Laura Ljungkvist

- Author: Mem Fox
- Illustrator: Laura Ljungkvist
- Language: English
- Genre: Children's picture book
- Published: 2013 (Penguin/Viking, Beach Lane Books/Simon and Schuster)
- Media type: Print (hardback)
- Pages: 30 (unpaginated)
- ISBN: 9780670077304
- OCLC: 845006456

Yoo-hoo, Ladybird! is a 2013 children's picture book by Mem Fox and illustrated by Laura Ljungkvist. In this book, the reader is invited to find a ladybird amongst a jumble of toys and everyday items. The game of hide-and-seek continues throughout the book with different scenarios.

== Publication history ==
- Yoo-hoo, Ladybug!, 2013, USA, Beach Lane Books ISBN 9781442434004
- Yoo-hoo, Ladybird!, 2013, Australia, Penguin/Viking ISBN 9780670077304

== Reception ==
A Publishers Weekly review of Yoo-hoo, Ladybird! wrote: "Effervescent graphics and an engrossing hide-and-seek game make this a diverting book to share".

Yoo-hoo, Ladybird! has also been reviewed by Kirkus Reviews, Booklist School Library Journal, and The Horn Book Magazine.

== See also ==
- Where's Wally?
