= Hello, Baby! =

Australian children's picture book by Mem Fox and illustrated by Steve Jenkins

- Author: Mem Fox
- Illustrator: Steve Jenkins
- Cover artist: Jenkins
- Language: English
- Genre: Children's picture book
- Published: 2009 (Penguin/Viking)
- Publication place: Australia
- Media type: Print (hardback)
- Pages: 32 (unpaginated)
- ISBN: 9780670074006
- OCLC: 782011101

Hello, Baby! is a 2009 children's picture book by Mem Fox and illustrated by Steve Jenkins. In this book the narrator asks the reader whether they are various animals.

== Reception ==
A review in Kirkus Reviews of Hello, Baby! wrote: "This picture book brims with fascinating animals, brilliant words and engaging artwork; it begs for cozy nightly readings". Booklist, comparing it to a previous Fox title, wrote: "As in her best-selling title Ten Little Fingers and Ten Little Toes (2008), a Booklist Editors' Choice selection, Fox creates an affectionate, singsong picture book directed straight at small children".

Hello, Baby! has also been reviewed by Publishers Weekly, School Library Journal, Horn Book Guides, Magpies, and Reading Time.
