= Two Little Monkeys =

Australian children's picture book by Mem Fox and Jill Barton

- Author: Mem Fox
- Illustrator: Jill Barton
- Language: English
- Genre: Children's picture book
- Published: 2012 (Viking)
- Publication place: Australia
- Media type: Print (hardback)
- Pages: 32 (unpaginated)
- ISBN: 9780670076529
- OCLC: 794930276

Two Little Monkeys is a 2012 children's picture book by Mem Fox and illustrated by Jill Barton. It is about two monkeys, named Cheeky and Chee, who escape from a leopard.

== Reception ==
A review in Kirkus Reviews of Two Little Monkeys wrote: "Irresistible rhythm, adorable monkeys and pitch-perfect rhyme make this a must-have for the preschool set. .. Barton's soft watercolors, in purple, gray and tan, are both captivating and comforting—never will readers actually fear for Cheeky and Chee’s safety".

Reviews of Two Little Monkeys have also been made in Publishers Weekly, Booklist, School Library Journal, The Horn Book Magazine, Library Media Connection, The Bulletin of the Center for Children's Books, Reading Time, and Scan.

== See also ==
- Two Little Dickie Birds
