= Whoever You Are =

Australian children's picture book

- Author: Mem Fox
- Illustrator: Leslie Staub
- Cover artist: L. Staub
- Language: English
- Genre: Children's picture book
- Published: 1997 (Hodder & Stoughton)
- Publication place: Australia
- Media type: Print (hardback)
- Pages: 32 (unpaginated)
- ISBN: 9780733608599
- OCLC: 864265926

Whoever You Are is a 1997 children's picture book by Australian writer Mem Fox and illustrated by Leslie Staub. It was published by Harcourt, Inc. In this book, the narrator with four children goes around the world appreciating the differences and similarities in people.

== Publication history ==
- Quienquiera Que Seas, 2001, USA, Libros Viajeros ISBN 9780152164607
- 1997, USA, Harcourt ISBN 9780152007874
- 1997, Australia, Hodder & Stoughton ISBN 9780733608599

== Reception ==
A review in School Library Journal of Whoever You Are wrote that "Fox has composed a simple refrain to celebrate human connections in this lovely picture book. ... Staub's oil paintings complement the simple text". Kirkus Reviews called it "an essential book that acknowledges in the simplest of terms our common humanity".

Whoever You Are has also been reviewed by Booklist, Publishers Weekly, Horn Book Guides, and Criticas.
