= Wombat Divine =

1995 children's book by Mem Fox

- 21st anniversary edition cover of Wombat Divine
- Author: Mem Fox
- Illustrator: Kerry Argent
- Cover artist: Kerry Argent
- Genre: Children's illustrated fiction
- Set in: Australia
- Publisher: Omnibus Books
- Publication date: 1995
- Publication place: Australia
- Pages: 32
- ISBN: 9780152020965

Wombat Divine is a 1995 Christmas-themed children's fiction book written by Australian author Mem Fox and illustrated by Kerry Argent. The book, written for children aged three years and above, tells the story of a young wombat who fears he will not be given a part in this year's Nativity play, but is delighted in the end to be chosen for the part of the Christ Child. A 21st anniversary edition of the book was published in 2016.

== Plot summary ==
Wombat has long dreamed of being in the annual Nativity play. When he is finally old enough to participate, he enters every audition, only to be rejected each time on the grounds that he is "too big for some parts, too small for others, too short, too clumsy..." until he fears that his dream will go unfulfilled. Fortunately, "wise Emu" has an idea—a sleepy Wombat would be well suited to the part of baby Jesus. Wombat accepts the part and ends up stealing the show as he falls asleep during the performance, just as a real baby might.

=== Characters ===
In addition to Wombat, the story features a host of native Australian animals as characters including kangaroos, koalas, numbats, emus, bilbies and platypuses.

== Composition and publication ==
Wombat Divine was written by Australian children's author Mem Fox and illustrated by Kerry Argent. The book came about via a request from the author's then publisher, Omnibus Books, to write "a typically Australian Christmas story". Fox replied that she had never written a book to order and doubted she could manage it, but her publisher promised assistance. After two years of failed collaborative effort, Fox declared that she was unable to complete the project. In a last-ditch attempt, Fox's publisher suggested to make a 32-page book and write the story in it. This proved to be the conceptual breakthrough for Fox, and she was able to write the book.

Wombat Divine is 32 pages long and 28 centimetres (11 in) in height. Originally published in 1995 by Omnibus Books (ISBN 9780152020965), a 15th anniversary edition was published in 2009 and a 21st anniversary edition on 1 October 2016 by Scholastic Australia (ISBN 9781742991221).

== Reception ==
American children's author Ally Condie wrote of Wombat Divine that "[m]y kids love the different animals and the lovely illustrations, and the ending is perfect and inclusive". BookPage's children's book editor described Wombat Divine as "vintage Mem Fox ... the native Australian animals display such human concern for Wombat that readers of any age will be immersed in the drama". The Australian government website described Wombat Divine as a "favourite" and an example of "truly Australian children's Christmas literature". A bullet review in The New York Times said of the book that "[t]he story and the illustrations are both enchanting and endearing. Plus nifty animals".

The book's author, Mem Fox, related on her blog how one reader, while thanking her for the book, had remarked that "I have a Down's syndrome child and this wombat is just him. I couldn’t stop crying". Fox then revealed that a memorable performance she had seen of a Down's syndrome child in a children's play had provided inspiration for the story. Fox has also said of the book that she likes the "gentle religious reminder to return Jesus to the centre of the Christmas story, which is missing from many Christmas books".

The book has spawned a number of study aids for teaching young children. In 1996, Australian composer Sean O'Boyle wrote a score to accompany an audio version of the story. Wombat Divine was also adopted as the theme for Myer Melbourne's 2006 Christmas Windows display.
