= Tough Boris =

1994 book by Mem Fox

- Front cover, designed by Kathryn Brown
- Author: Mem Fox
- Illustrator: Kathryn Brown
- Language: English
- Genre: Children's picture book
- Published: 1994 (HMH Books for Young Readers)
- Publication place: Australia
- Media type: Print (hardback)
- Pages: 32 (unpaginated)
- ISBN: 9780152896126
- OCLC: 28257302

Tough Boris is a 1994 children's picture book by Mem Fox, with pictures by Katherine Brown. It is about a pirate who grieves when his parrot dies and a boy who helps him through this difficult time.

== Reception ==
Booklist wrote that "this picture book is full of surprises, both in the simple text and in the dramatic underlying story the pictures tell", but also said "the design is confusing; the boy appears on the imprint page but then remains hidden until the middle of the book; some kids may be puzzled about where he comes from". The School Library Journal called it "a compelling and entertaining tale of adventure". A New York Times review noted "a rather puny story line", and concluded: "Resisting the temptation to reveal everything, author and illustrator instead give imaginative children something much better -- a picture book that luxuriates in pure possibility".

It has also been reviewed by Kirkus Reviews, and Publishers Weekly.
