= Sleepy Bears =

1999 picture book by Mem Fox

- Author: Mem Fox
- Illustrator: Kerry Argent
- Language: English
- Genre: Children's picture book, poetry
- Published: 1999 (Pan Macmillan)
- Publication place: Australia
- Media type: Print (hardback)
- Pages: 32 (unpaginated)
- ISBN: 9780732909802
- OCLC: 222315418

Sleepy Bears is a 1999 children's picture book by Mem Fox. It is about a bear preparing her family of six baby bears for hibernation.

== Reception ==
In a review of Sleepy Bears, Booklist wrote: "As in Koala Lou (1988), Fox depicts the comfort and security of family without ever resorting to the syrup of many "I love you" books for preschoolers". School Library Journal called it a cleverly written bedtime book, while Kirkus Reviews found it "a bewitching collection of sleepy time rhymes".

Sleepy Bears has also been reviewed by Publishers Weekly.

== See also ==
- Time for Bed - another bedtime book by Mem Fox
