= Joyce Nicholson =

Australian writer (1919–2011)

Joyce Nicholson AM
- Born: Joyce Thorpe; 1 June 1919; Melbourne, Victoria, Australia
- Died: 30 January 2011 (aged 91)
- Education: Methodist Ladies' College, Melbourne; University of Melbourne
- Occupations: Author, publisher, businesswoman
- Writing career
- Years active: 1935–2000
- Genres: Children's literature, nonfiction, feminist writing
- Notable works: A Life of Books (2000); The Heartache of Motherhood (1983)
- Notable awards: Member of the Order of Australia (1983); Lloyd O'Neil Award (1998)

Joyce Nicholson AM (née Thorpe) (1 June 1919 – 30 January 2011) was an Australian author and businesswoman.

== Biography ==
Nicholson was born in Melbourne, the daughter of publisher D.W. Thorpe. She was educated at Methodist Ladies' College and the University of Melbourne. She was involved with Sisters Publishing and served as managing director, later becoming the sole owner, of D.W. Thorpe Pty Ltd from 1968 until the company was sold in 1987.

Nicholson authored over 25 books, many of which focused on children and women's issues. In 1983, she was appointed a Member of the Order of Australia (AM) for her contributions to literature and the book publishing industry.

She married Harvey Nicholson and had four children: Peter, Hilary, Wendy, and Michael.

Nicholson sponsored the Joyce Thorpe Nicholson Collection at the University of Melbourne, which includes books by and about Australian women, rare 19th-century materials, and 20th-century political ephemera. The Joyce Thorpe Nicholson Hall of Fame Award, presented by Thorpe Bowker, recognises designers who have made significant contributions to book design in Australia.

== Timeline ==
(Details from an online biography)

- 1935–1946: junior typist, secretary and sub-editor at D W Thorpe Pty Ltd (Melbourne)
- 1940: vice-president of the Student Representative Council at the University of Melbourne
- 1943: married George Harvey Nicholson (dec.1980). They had four children
- 1947–1968: writer and part-time work at D W Thorpe Pty Ltd (Melbourne)
- 1957: organizer of the first Children's Book Week in Victoria
- 1968–1980: managing director and proprietor of D W Thorpe Pty Ltd (Melbourne), and editor, Australian Bookseller and Australian Books in Print
- 1971–1974: editor of the newsletter of the Royal Historical Society of Victoria
- 1972–1983: secretary and executive member of the Australian Library Promotion Council
- 1974: founding member of the National Book Council
- 1979–1980: co-founder and director of Sisters Publishing Ltd
- 1987–1992: chief executive officer of Jayen Press
- 1993: chief executive officer of Courtyard Press
- 1998: recipient of the Lloyd O'Neil Award for services to the Book Industry

== Books ==
- Nicholson, Joyce, How to play auction bridge, G.W. Green & Sons, [Melbourne], [193-], 23 pp.
- Nicholson, Joyce, How to play solo : complete guide to solo (solo whist), auction solo, three-handed solo, hints on bidding and play, scoring, illustrated hands, with special chapter for beginners who have never played cards of any kind, Gordon and Gotch (Wholesale distributors), Melbourne, [1945?], 64 pp.
- Nicholson, Joyce, The Way to Play – a book on strategies to win at the card Game Solo
- Nicholson, Joyce, You can run a library, Australian Red Cross Society, [Melbourne?], 1948, 56 pp.
- Nicholson, Joyce, Our first overlander, Shakespeare Head Press, Sydney, 1956, 128 pp.
- Nicholson, Joyce, The Children's Party and Games Book, 1957 – Over 100 different games from the 1950s. Epworth Press
- Nicholson, Joyce, Kerri and Honey, Lansdowne, Melbourne, 1962, 32 pp.
- Nicholson, Joyce, A mortar-board for Priscilla, Children's Library Guild of Australia, Melbourne, 1963, 121 pp.
- Nicholson, Joyce, Freedom for Priscilla, Thomas Nelson, Melbourne, 1974, 121 pp.
- Nicholson, Joyce, Cranky – The baby Australian Camel, Lansdowne press, [Melbourne], 1983
- Nicholson, Joyce, Why women lose at bridge, V. Gollancz in association with P. Crawley, London, 1985, 95 pp.
- Nicholson, Joyce, Man against mutiny : the story of Vice-Admiral Bligh, Lutterworth Press, London, c1961, 95 pp.
- Nicholson, Joyce, (compiled by ), Successful parties and social evenings, Gordon and Gotch [Distributor], Melbourne, [195-?], 64 pp.
- Nicholson, Joyce, and De Lisle, Gordon (photography by), Ringtail the possum, Lansdowne, [Melbourne], 1965, 32 pp.
- Nicholson, Joyce, & Leunig, Mary, 1950– (illustrated by), What society does to girls, Pitman (Australia), Carlton, Vic., 1975, 70 pp.
- Nicholson, Joyce, & Max B. Miller (illustrations by), The little green tractor, Little Books Publishing House, Hawthorn, Vic, [1950]
- Nicholson, Joyce, & Max B. Miller (illustrations by), The little blue car, Little Books Publishing House, Hawthorn, Vic, [19??]
- Nicholson, Joyce, & McArdle, Brian (photography by), Sir Charles and the lyrebird, Lansdowne, Melbourne, 1966
- Nicholson, Joyce, & Smith, L. H. (Leonard Hart), 1910– (photography by ), Woop the wombat, Lansdowne, [Melbourne], [1968], 32 pp.
- Nicholson, Joyce, & Smith, L. H. (Leonard Hart), 1910–, illus., Yap the penguin, Lansdowne, [Melbourne], 1967, 32 pp.
- Nicholson, Joyce, & Thorpe, Daniel (Daniel Wrixon), 1889–1976., A life of books : the story of D.W. Thorpe Pty Ltd., 1921–1987, Courtyard Press, Middle Park, Vic., 2000, 326 pp. The story of DW Thorpe Publishers (Publishers of Australian Bookseller & Publisher). A Life of books is a chronicle not only of a family company that has been at the centre of the book trade in Australia since the 1920s, but equally, of the people, companies, associations, issues, debates, troubles and joys that have affected the industry.
- Nicholson, Joyce, The Heartache of Motherhood, 1983 From the mother of 4 grown-up children. After 35 years of devoted marriage, she left the family home to live alone – happily. This book is a deeply personal account of her feelings about being a mother; her honesty is extraordinary and very moving, her conclusions startling.
- Nicholson, Joyce, Daughter to Bligh, 2012 www.digbys.com – The story of Mary Bligh, daughter of William Bligh.

== Journal articles ==
- Gorman, Lyn, A life in books, Australian Library Journal, vol. 49, no. 4, 2000, pp. 374–376.
- First Pacific Book Trade Seminar Papers, D. W. Thorpe (January 1976)

== Thesis ==
- Nicholson, Joyce. The Women's Electoral Lobby and Women's Employment: Strategies and Outcomes. MA thesis, The University of Melbourne, 1991, 118 pp.
