= Judy Horacek =

Australian cartoonist, illustrator, children's writer

- Born: 1961 (age 64–65); Melbourne, Australia
- Occupations: Comic book/strip artist, illustrator
- Website: horacek.com.au

Judy Horacek (born 12 November 1961) is an Australian cartoonist, artist, writer and children's book creator. She is best known for her award winning children's picture book Where is the Green Sheep? with Mem Fox, and her cartoons which have been published all over the world. She has been a regular cartoonist for newspapers including The Age newspaper, The Canberra Times, The Australian and The Australia Institute Newsletter. Horacek's latest book is Now or Never (2020), her tenth cartoon collection. She received the 2024 Stanley Award for Single Gag Cartoonist.

In 2005, a selection of her work was acquired by the National Library of Australia for its collection. She said at the time that "I really like being recognised for having done work that is part of the social discourse. And it's always nice to see cartoons get another lease on life – now they represent a particular time and context and become part of the portrait of who we [Australians] are".

== Life ==
Horacek graduated with a BA from the University of Melbourne in 1991, majoring in Fine Arts and English. She then studied for a Diploma in Museum Studies at Victoria University. In 2007, she graduated with a Bachelor of Arts (Visual) in Printmedia and Drawing from Australian National University.

She lives in Melbourne.

== Writing ==
Horacek started her career as a writer, and was a member of a community writing group in North Melbourne. Words are an important part of her cartoons, and sometimes dominate the pictures. Her stories have appeared in a number of anthologies.

After collaborating on a children's picture book with Mem Fox, she began to write and illustrate her own children's books, something she had always wanted to do, in addition to continuing to work with Mem Fox.

== Cartoons ==
"My life has been a quest to find new and better place to stick cartoons", Horacek has said. Accordingly, her cartoons can be found in newspapers and magazines, online, on various merchandise items and as limited edition prints. Her cartoons have been described as whimsical and quirky. As she says, "I take every day situations and make them strange"

It was her interest in feminism which "drove Horacek's early work and established her reputation as a cartoonist". Since then, in addition to an ongoing interest in women's issues, her cartoons have covered a wide range of social and political issues such as the environment, climate change, the Australian Republican Movement, immigration, indigenous issues and FlyBuys. Cartoonist Peter Nicholson describes her work as follows:

For most of her professional life her cartoons have been more on the theme of people's everyday lives and worries. When this is your subject matter you start in more of a vacuum. You need a powerful imagination, a great sense of humour, a real understanding of the human condition and you must have something to say ... there is an advantage to this type of cartoon. It has lasting value.

Horacek's first commissioned work for The Age newspaper was published on International Women's Day 1995, next to the obituary of Senator Olive Zakharov. This was her cartoon, Woman with Altitude, a work which has since appeared on fridge magnets greeting cards, tea-towels and T-shirts. In 2007, she said that "The woman with altitude ... represents who we could be". At various times she has had regular spots in such newspapers and magazines as The Age, The Weekend Australian Magazine, The Canberra Times, the Australian Book Review, the Australia Institute newsletter and currently The Monthly.

== Illustration ==
She illustrated Mem Fox's non-fiction book, Reading Magic, and in 2004 she and Mem Fox collaborated on Where Is the Green Sheep?, Judy's first picture book. It was shortlisted for several book awards, and in 2005 won the Children's Book Council of Australia Book of the Year – Early Childhood Award and the 2005 Speech Pathology Australia Award. Fox and Horacek collaborated on five other picture books, Goodnight, Sleep Tight (2013), This & That (2015), Ducks Away (2016), Bonnie & Ben Rhyme Again (2018) and Meerkat Mayhem (2024). She written her own children's books, the first being The Story of GROWL (2007), followed by "These are My Hands" (2008), "These are My Feet" (2009) and "Yellow is my favourite colour", as well as a series of reimagined nursery rhymes including Hey Diddle Diddle (2024) and Hickory Dickory Dock (2025).

Where is the Green Sheep? was published both in Australia and the USA in 2004 and has been translated into Spanish, Korean, simple Chinese, Hebrew, Krzg. The Indigenous Literacy Foundation has published it in three Australian Indigenous languages, Pitjantjatjara, Kriol and Kunwinjku.

In 2024 Penguin Random House released a special edition of Where is the Green Sheep? with a gold foil cover. Additionally, the Royal Australian Mint produced a commemorative 20 cent coin with a Horacek illustration derived from the original book.

== Children's books ==
- Where Is the Green Sheep?, with Mem Fox (2004, ISBN 0-15-204907-X and ISBN 0-670-04149-1)
- The Story of GROWL (2007, ISBN 978-0-670-07045-9)
- These are My Feet (2007, ISBN 978-0-14-350224-1)
- These are My Hands (2008, ISBN 9780143502593)
- Yellow is my favourite colour (2010, ISBN 9780143504283)
- Good Night, Sleep Tight, Mem Fox, Illustrated by Judy Horacek (2012, ISBN 978-1-74283-257-9)
- Yellow is my colour star (2014, ISBN 9781743622728)
- This & That with Mem Fox (2015, ISBN 9781743622537)
- Ducks Away! with Mem Fox (2016, ISBN 9781760158514)
- Bonnie and Ben Rhyme Again with Mem Fox (2018, ISBN 9781742996240)
- Hey Diddle Diddle (2024, ISBN 9781760658632)
- Meerkat Mayhem with Mem Fox (2024, ISBN 9780143777687)
- Hickory Dickory Dock (2025, ISBN 9781761600814)

== Cartoon collections ==
- Life on the Edge, Introduced by Dale Spender (1992, ISBN 1-875559-11-6 and 2003, ISBN 1-876756-41-1)
- Unrequited Love: Nos. 1–100 (1994, ISBN 0-86914-349-2)
- Lost in Space (1997, ISBN 9781864484755)
- Woman with Altitude (1997, ISBN 1-86447-101-8 and 1998, ISBN 0-7336-1029-3)
- If the fruit fits (1999, ISBN 0-7336-1051-X)
- I am woman, hear me draw / cartoons from the pen of Judy Horacek (2003, ISBN 1-876944-10-2)
- Make Cakes Not War, (2007, ISBN 9780740769634)
- If you can't stand the heat (2010, ISBN 9781921640025)
- Random Life (2017, ISBN 9780987612908)
- Now or Never (2020, ISBN 9780987612946)

== Exhibitions ==
Horacek has regularly shown her prints and watercolour painting in commercial galleries in solo and group exhibitions.

She has had retrospectives at the National Gallery of Victoria, Laughter, the Universe and Everything, which toured regional Victoria, and at the National Museum of Australia, the exhibition I am woman hear me draw in 2002. This exhibition toured throughout Australia.

== Other works ==
- Mary Jane: living through anorexia and bulimia nervosa / Sancia Robinson with Foong Ling Kong and cartoons by Judy Horacek (1996, ISBN 0-09-183266-7)
- The women's power pocket book / Joan Kirner and Moira Rayner with illustrations by Judy Horacek (2000, ISBN 0-14-029540-2)
- Reading Magic: how your child can learn to read before school and other important things / Mem Fox with illustrations by Judy Horacek (2001, ISBN 0-330-36282-8, ISBN 0-15-601076-3, ISBN 0-15-100624-5; 2004, ISBN 0-330-42140-9 and 2005, ISBN 0-330-42222-7)
- The Night Before Mother's Day, Doug MacLeod, Illustrated by Judy Horacek (2012, ISBN 9781742379401)
- Worked with Flying Fruit Flies circus to produce Girls with Altitude circus show using her cartoons.
- Horacek worked as Visual Art Director on Monkey Baa Theatre Company's theatre production of ‘‘Where is the Green Sheep?’’ which premiered in Brisbane in 2025, and is currently touring Australia with locations including the Sydney Opera House.
- Horacek created and performed her cartoon slide show, Everyone on the Bus Fell Down (Not Just Me) at the Melbourne International Comedy Festival 2026.
