= The Story of Growl =

Book by Judy Horacek

The story of GROWL
- Author: Judy Horacek
- Illustrator: Judy Horacek
- Language: English
- Genre: Children's picture book
- Published: 2007 (Penguin)
- Publication place: Australia
- Media type: Print (paperback, hardback)
- Pages: 32 (unpaginated)
- ISBN: 9780670070459
- OCLC: 225081975

The Story of GROWL is a 2007 children's picture book by Judy Horacek. It is about a little female monster, Growl, who loves to growl, is banned from growling for disturbing the neighbours, but is then allowed to resume growling after scaring a burglar.

== Reception ==
Publishers Weekly, reviewing The Story of GROWL, wrote "Horacek (illustrator of Where Is the Green Sheep? ) draws goofy cartoons with a genial, contemporary look, and Growl exudes a Pokémonesque charm: her saw-toothed smile is hard to resist. The text leaves little to the imagination (“Growl was the saddest she'd ever been.... She tried to run around her garden, but running is hard when you're trying not to cry”), but frequent cues to say “growl” as loudly as possible will invigorate readers." and The Horn Book Magazine wrote "Learning when it's appropriate to be loud is a lesson that will resonate with kids. Simple cartoon-style illustrations incorporating bold black growls encourage a spirited reading aloud."

The Story of GROWL has also been reviewed by Kirkus Reviews, School Library Journal, Reading Time, and Catholic Library World.

== See also ==
- Female monsters in literature
