= Tell Me About Your Day Today =

Australian children's picture book by Mem Fox and Lauren Stringer

- Author: Mem Fox
- Illustrator: Lauren Stringer
- Language: English
- Genre: Children's picture book
- Published: 2012 (Scholastic Australia)
- Publication place: Australia
- Media type: Print (hardback)
- Pages: 32 (unpaginated)
- ISBN: 9781742835785
- OCLC: 799146002

Tell Me About Your Day Today is a 2012 children's picture book by Mem Fox and Lauren Stringer. It is about a boy discussing the day's events with his favorite stuffed toys.

== Reception ==
On reviewing Tell Me About Your Day Today Kirkus Reviews wrote: "The specifics are told wordlessly and in great detail in Stringer’s bright acrylic illustrations with just the right softly fuzzy surroundings. ... Fox's use of rhyme and repetition has a flowing cadence that moves briskly along while allowing time to savor the details of the innocent delight of a small child’s imagination". Horn Book Guides found that "Stringer's illustrative vignettes in soft nighttime colors with thoughtful design elements complement Fox's simple, lyrical text in this reassuring bedtime story".

Tell Me About Your Day Today has also been reviewed by Publishers Weekly, Booklist, School Library Journal, Magpies, and The New York Times.

It is a 2013 Minnesota Book Awards Children's Literature finalist.
