= Boo to a Goose =

Children's picture book by Mem Fox and David Miller

- Author: Mem Fox
- Illustrator: David Miller
- Cover artist: D. Miller
- Language: English
- Genre: Children's picture book, fiction
- Published: 1996 (Hodder Children's Books)
- Publication place: Australia
- Media type: Print (hardback)
- Pages: 32 (unpaginated)
- ISBN: 9780733604591
- OCLC: 38377166

Boo to a Goose is a 1996 children's picture book by Australian author Mem Fox, and illustrated by David Miller. In this book, published by Hodder and Stoughton Children's Books, a boy states twelve nonsensical things he would rather do than say "boo to a goose". (Note: Someone who wouldn't say boo to a goose is timid and shy.)

== Publication history ==
- 1998, USA, Dial Books for Young Readers ISBN 9780803722743
- 1996, Australia, Hodder Children's Books ISBN 9780733604591

== Reception ==
Kirkus Reviews called it "in words and art, a delightful mix of nonsense and verve", and Booklist found it ".. a series of silly rhyming fantasies gorgeously illustrated with dramatic cut-paper collages".

Boo to a Goose has also been reviewed by the following publications: School Library Journal, and The Horn Book Magazine.
