= Guess What? =

Picture book for children

- First edition
- Author: Mem Fox
- Illustrator: Vivienne Goodman
- Language: English
- Genre: Children's literature
- Publisher: Omnibus Books
- Publication date: 1988
- Publication place: Australia
- Media type: Print
- Pages: 32
- ISBN: 0-94-964127-8
- LC Class: PZ7.F8373 Gu 1990

Guess What? is a picture book for children, written by Mem Fox and illustrated by Vivienne Goodman, about an old woman, with various witchlike qualities. It was published in Australia in 1988 by Omnibus Books, and an American edition was published in 1990 by Harcourt Brace Jovanovich.

The book has a steady phrasing, along the lines of:

She looks like she has a _____! Guess what? She does!
She looks like she likes to _____! Guess what? She does!

The book's final twist reveals the old woman as a witch. Guess What? is on the American Library Association list of the 100 Most Frequently Challenged Books of 1990–2000 at number 66. The challenges to the book are generated because of the supposed occult connection since the book is leading the reader to develop a positive impression of a witch.

== Book Banning ==
In May 2023, the book was banned in Duval County, Florida after accusations that the book was accused of containing pornographic images.

The book is one of many LGBTQIA+ titles with culturally diverse themes that have been removed from school libraries across Florida since the introduction of the Florida Parental Rights in Education Act.

The censors took offense to an illustration in the book that shows the central character, Daisy O'Grady, taking a bath.
