= Bonnie and Ben Rhyme Again =

Australian children's picture book by Mem Fox

- Author: Mem Fox
- Illustrator: Judy Horacek
- Cover artist: Judy Horacek
- Language: English
- Genre: Children's picture book
- Published: 2018 (Scholastic Australia)
- Publication place: Australia
- Media type: Print (hardback)
- Pages: 32 (unpaginated)
- ISBN: 9781742996240
- OCLC: 1076520366

Bonnie and Ben Rhyme Again is a 2018 children's picture book by Mem Fox and illustrated by Judy Horacek. In this book, a sequel to Good Night, Sleep Tight, two children, Bonnie and Ben, recite some nursery rhymes to their friend, Skinny Doug, while going for a walk.

== Publication history ==
- 2019, USA, Beach Lane Books ISBN 9781534453524
- 2018, Australia, Scholastic Australia ISBN 9780670836147

== Reception ==
A review in Booklist of Bonnie and Ben Rhyme Again wrote: "The classics are showcased while the contemporary story celebrates them within a playful context. The illustrations feature simple, pleasing ink drawings, brightened with cheerful watercolors".

Bonnie and Ben Rhyme Again has also been reviewed by School Library Journal, Reading Time, Kirkus Reviews, and The New York Times.

== See also ==
- Good Night, Sleep Tight
