= Hello Baby (2025 film) =

- Theatrical release poster
- Directed by: Ram Gopal Ratnam
- Produced by: Kandregula Adhinarayana
- Starring: Kavya Keerthi
- Cinematography: Ramana K Naidu
- Edited by: Sairam Tatipalli
- Music by: Sukumar Pammi
- Production company: Skml Motion Pictures
- Release date: 25 April 2025
- Country: India
- Language: Telugu

Hello Baby is a 2025 Indian Telugu-language film directed by Ram Gopal Ratnam and produced by Kandregula Adhinarayana under the banner Skml Motion Pictures. The film stars Kavya Keerthi in the lead role.

== Cast ==
- Kavya Keerthi as Adya

== Production ==
The film's music is composed by Sukumar Pammi, with cinematography by Ramana K Naidu and editing by Sairam Tatipalli.

== Reception ==
Suhas Sistu of The Hans India wrote, "Hello Baby is a must-watch for those who enjoy intense psychological thrillers. It's a different kind of film that deserves both appreciation and audience support.
