= Peter Nicholson (cartoonist) =

Australian political cartoonist, and sculptor

Peter Nicholson (born 1946) is an Australian political cartoonist, caricaturist, and sculptor. He has won several Walkley Awards. He is also known for his busts of Prime Ministers of Australia in the Ballarat Botanical Gardens.

== Early life ==
Peter Nicholson was born in 1946.

== Career ==
Nicholson has produced numerous political cartoons for publication in newspapers, in particular The Age and The Australian. He has also produced animated political cartoons for the Australian Broadcasting Corporation and the TV series Fast Forward, and was involved in the Rubbery Figures television series.

He is also a sculptor. Nicholson created the busts of Malcolm Fraser, Bob Hawke, Paul Keating, John Howard, Kevin Rudd and Julia Gillard, which are part of the Prime Ministers Avenue in the Ballarat Botanical Gardens.

== Awards ==
Year	Section	Award	Story	Media
1982	Artwork	Best Cartoon		The Age
1991	Artwork	Best Cartoon		The Age
1992	Artwork	Best Illustration	Joan Kirner and Jeff Kennett	The Age
1992	Artwork	Best Illustration	Olympic Archer/Unemployment	The Age
2009	Print	Best Cartoon	Bashir and Bombing	The Australian

== Gallery ==
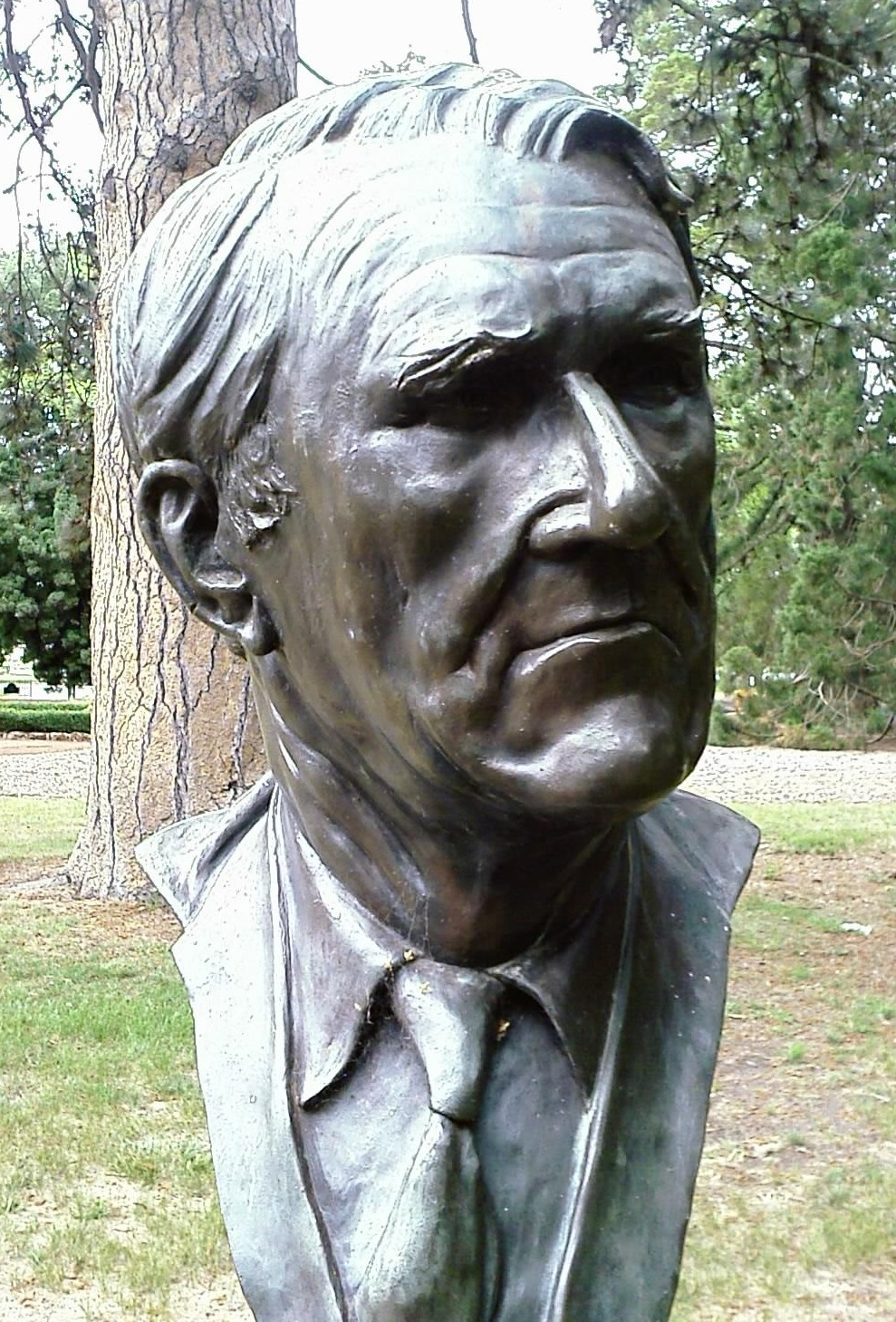

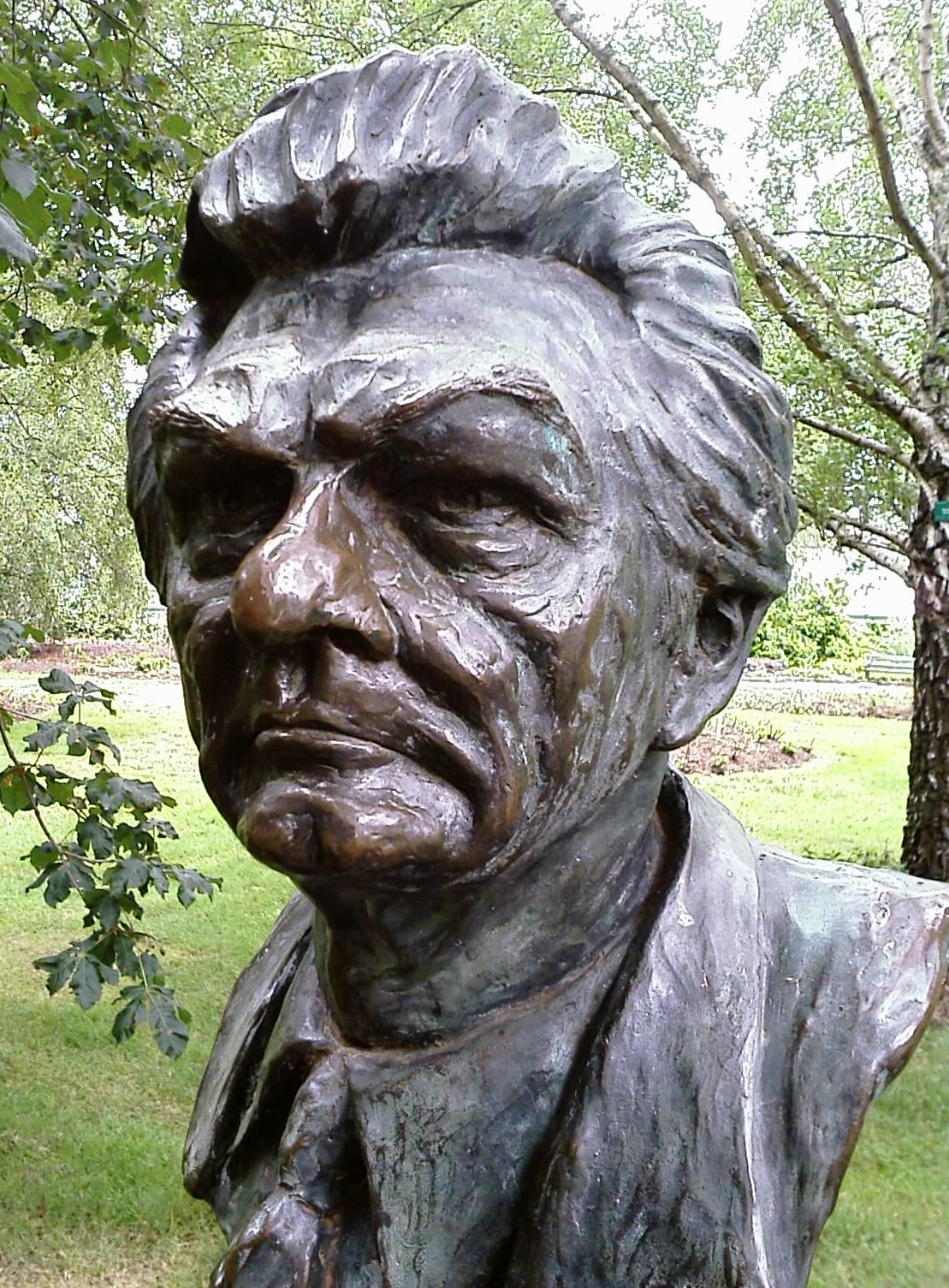

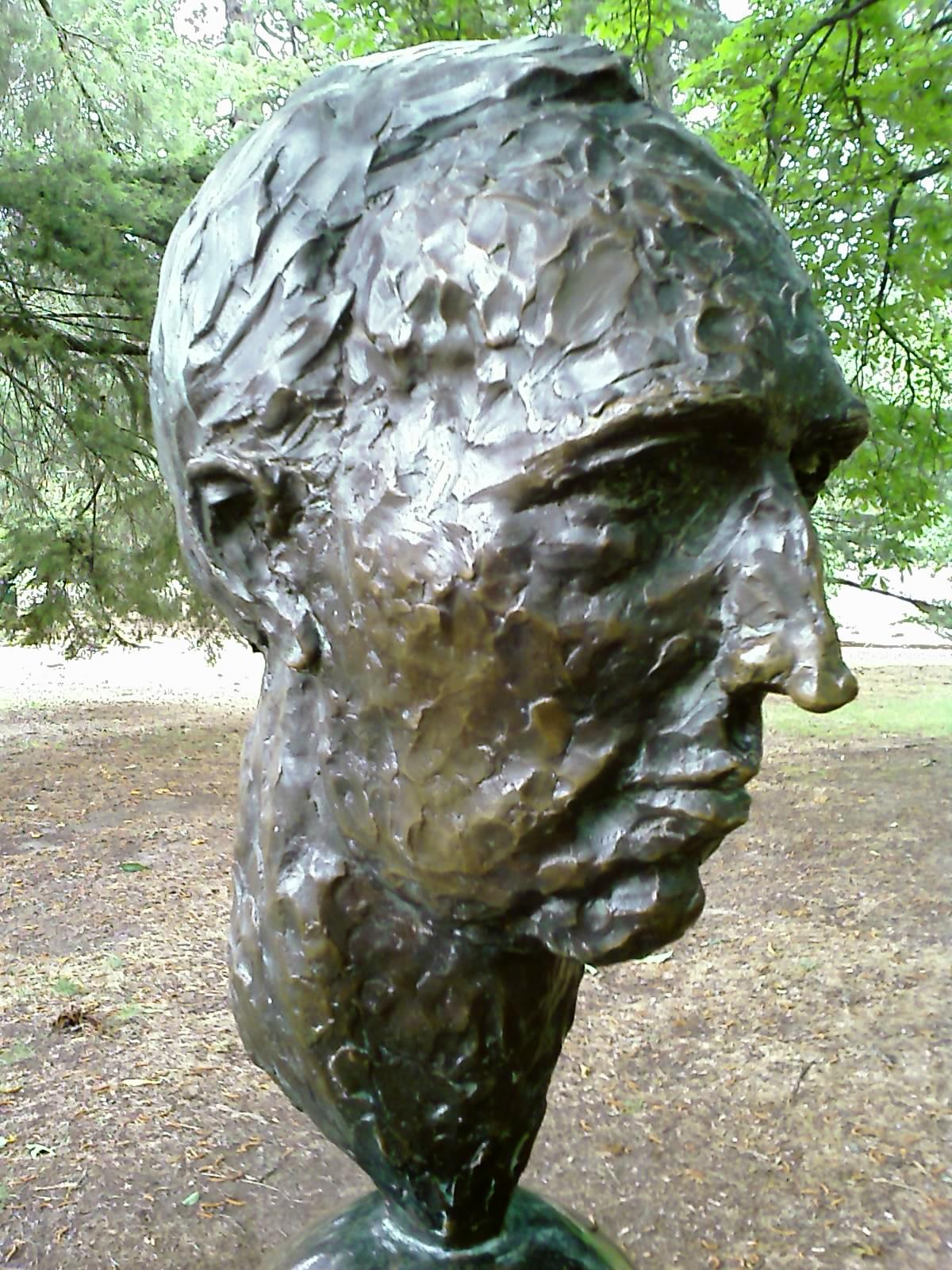

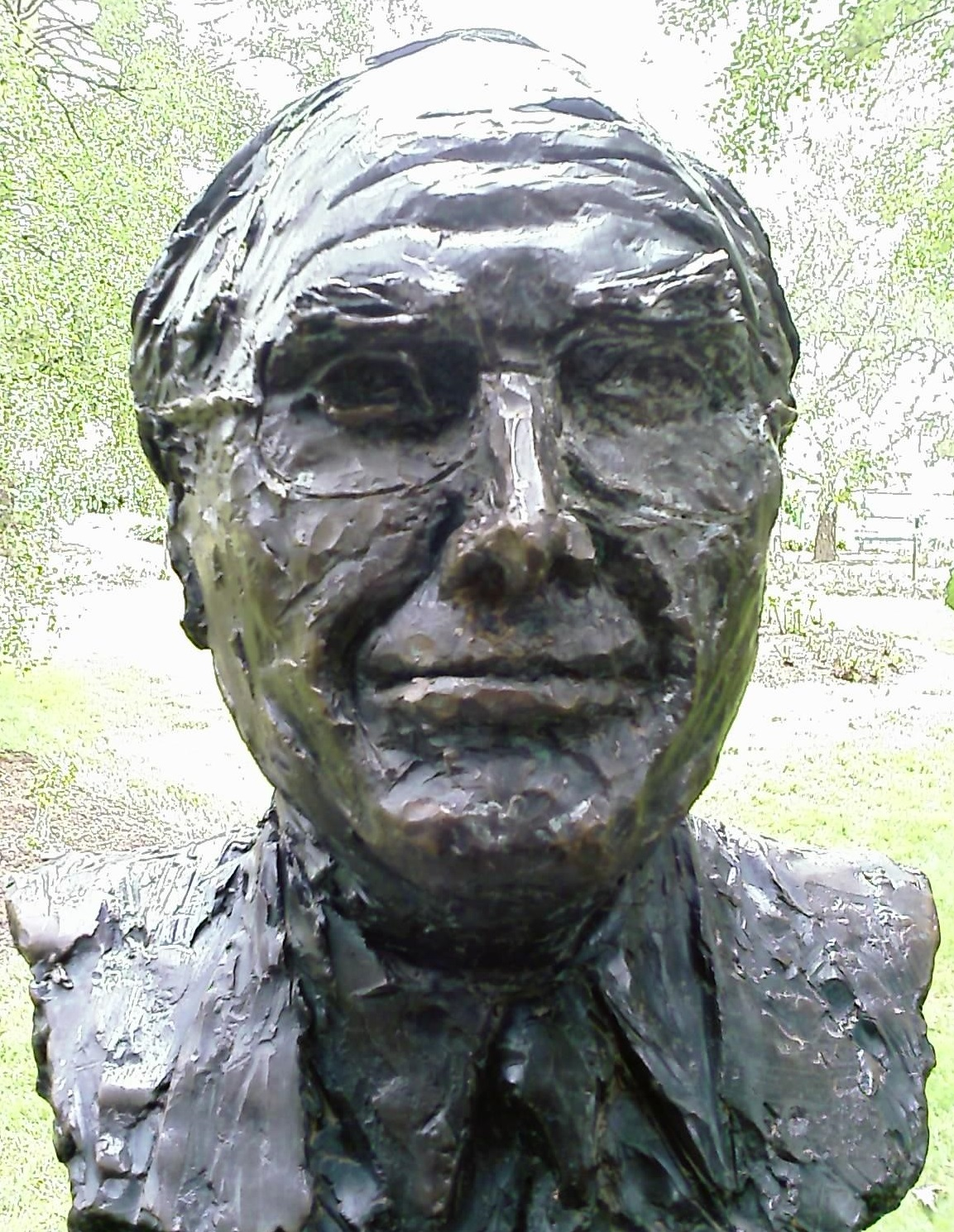

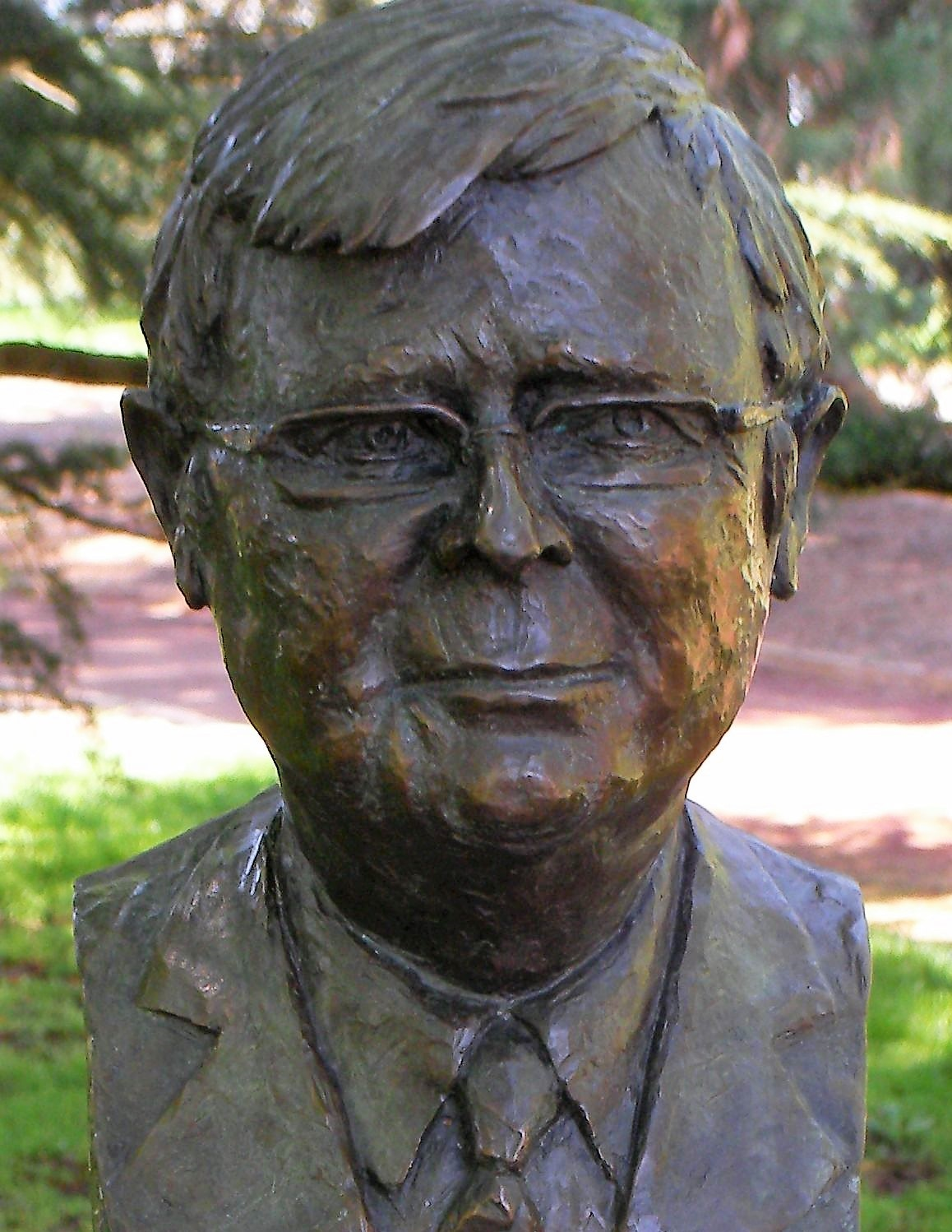

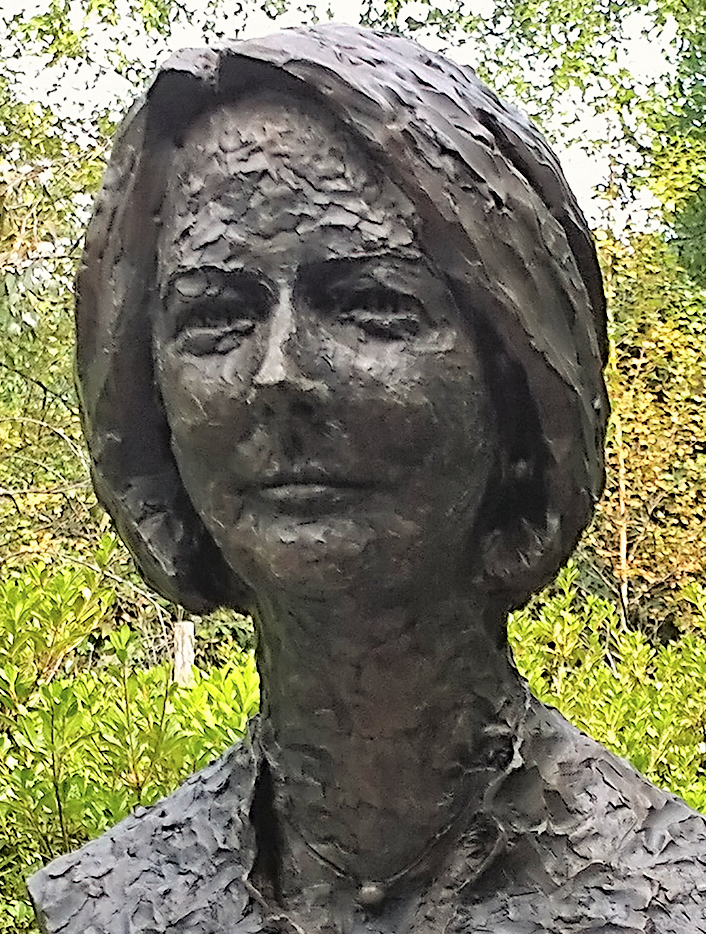

== See also ==
- Joyce Nicholson
