= Reading Magic =

Non-fiction book by Mem Fox

Reading Magic: How Your Child Can Learn to Read Before School - and Other Read-aloud Miracles
- First edition
- Author: Mem Fox
- Illustrator: Judy Horacek
- Language: English
- Subject: Reading literacy, early childhood
- Published: 2001 (Pan Macmillan)
- Publication place: Australia
- Media type: Print (paperback)
- Pages: 145
- ISBN: 9780330362825
- OCLC: 62537647

Reading Magic: How Your Child Can Learn to Read Before School - and Other Read-aloud Miracles is a 2001 book by Mem Fox. In it, Fox propounds reading books aloud to children from when they are babies to after they can read by themselves.

== Reception ==
In a review of Reading Magic Booklist noted its "cheerful, chatty style that's totally jargon-free" and recommended it for new parents. January Magazine', in its review, wrote: "Fox' book isn't some boring, didactic treatise on how to improve your child's reading skills. In fact, she's not at all fond of the phonics fanatics, and even discourages making your child read aloud to show their progress". Library Journal Review calls it a "rah-rah book on the benefits of reading aloud to children" and "a marginal purchase for public libraries".

Reading Magic has also been reviewed by Publishers Weekly and the School Library Journal.
