= Ten Little Fingers and Ten Little Toes =

Book by Mem Fox and Helen Oxenbury

- Author: Mem Fox
- Illustrator: Helen Oxenbury
- Language: English
- Genre: Children's picture book
- Published: 2008 (Harcourt)
- Publication place: Australia
- Media type: Print (hardback)
- Pages: 40 (unpaginated)
- ISBN: 9780152060572
- OCLC: 488538353

Ten Little Fingers and Ten Little Toes is a 2008 children's picture book by Mem Fox and Helen Oxenbury. It is about babies, who, although they are from around the world, all share the common trait of having the same number of digits.

== Reception ==
Ten Little Fingers has been commended for its positive treatment of racial diversity.

A review by The New York Times stated that "two beloved picture-book creators — the storyteller Mem Fox and the artist Helen Oxenbury — merge their talents in a winsome look at babies around the world". Booklist called it "a standout for its beautiful simplicity" and "a gentle, joyous offering" School Library Journal described it as a "nearly perfect picture book" and concluded: "Whether shared one-on-one or in storytimes, where the large trim size and big, clear images will carry perfectly, this selection is sure to be a hit". Publishers Weekly, in a starred review, wrote: "Put two titans of kids' books together for the first time, and what do you get (besides the urge to shout, "What took you so long?")? The answer: an instant classic". New York Journal of Books, in a review of a bilingual edition, wrote: "This is a sturdy, toddler-sized board book that has something for everybody. Ms. Fox's text, soft and pure, offers sweet innocence, the joy of lives beginning, and the unique beauty of the mother-child love. Artist Helen Oxenbury's exquisite illustrations are the perfect complement to the text".

The Horn Book Magazine referred to it as a "love song": "Snuggle up with your favorite baby and kiss those fingers and toes to both your hearts' content". BookPage Reviews called it "a jewel of a picture book" and wrote: "With minimal text, and sweet illustrations by beloved British artist Helen Oxenbury, it's truly an international treat. .. Ten Little Fingers and Ten Little Toes gently presents—but never preaches—a satisfying lesson about humanity and international harmony".

Ten Little Fingers has also been reviewed by the Journal of Children's Literature, The Christian Century, First Opinions -- Second Reactions, YC: Young Children.

It won the 2009 Australian Book Industry Book of the Year for Younger Children Award.
