= This & That (Fox book) =

Australian children's picture book by Mem Fox and Judy Horacek

- Author: Mem Fox
- Illustrator: Judy Horacek
- Cover artist: Horacek
- Language: English
- Genre: Children's picture book
- Published: 2015 (Scholastic Australia)
- Publication place: Australia
- Media type: Print (hardback)
- Pages: 32 (unpaginated)
- ISBN: 9781743622537
- OCLC: 906699585

This & That is a 2015 children's picture book by Mem Fox and illustrated by Judy Horacek. It is about a mouse telling bedtime stories to a pup.

== Publication history ==
- 2017, USA, Scholastic Press ISBN 9781338037807
- 2015, Australia, Scholastic Australia ISBN 9781743622537

== Reception ==
A reviewer in Reading Time wrote "Mem Fox's rhymed rhythmic text teams brilliantly with Judy’s bright quirky cartoon illustrations", and Publishers Weekly wrote "for times when a single bedtime story just isn't enough, ...".

There have been further reviews by Kirkus Reviews, School Library Journal. Reading Time, and Children's Book and Media Review.

It is a 2016 CBCA Book of the Year: Early Childhood notable book.
