= Bone Song =

2007 novel by John Meaney

- First edition
- Author: John Meaney
- Language: English
- Genre: Urban Fantasy, Dark Fantasy, Romance, Horror noir, Neo-noir, Tech-noir
- Publisher: Gollancz
- Publication date: 2007
- Publication place: United Kingdom
- Media type: Print (hardback & paperback)

Bone Song is a 2007 novel by British author John Meaney. It was the first novel in the Tristopolis series, followed by Dark Blood (2008), Tristopolis Requiem (2018), Tristopolis Howling (2020), Tristopolis Revenge (2021), and a short story collection Two for Tristopolis (2019).

== Plot summary ==
The novel is set in Tristopolis, a fantastic city where humans live side by side with zombies, wraiths, mages, witches, talking gargoyles and other mystical creatures. Death is a prominent theme in the culture of Tristopolis, with the characters using the names of Thanatos and Hades in place of "God", and the bones of the dead serve as the city's primary energy source.

The story revolves around the police detective Donal Riordan who is assigned to protect the opera diva Maria daLivnova against the Black Circle, a group of assassins who target gifted artists with the intent of trafficking their bones. After Riordan fails his mission, he realizes that he was set up as a pawn by his higher-ups, and is recruited into a task force which investigates the Black Circle and their connection to the higher ranks of the Tristopolis society. At the same time, Donal falls in love with his new superior, the beautiful zombie woman Laura Steele, and they begin a passionate romantic relationship.

== Reception ==
A number of reviews praised the inventiveness of the novel's setting, with Fantasy Book Critic comparing it to Tim Burton's Corpse Bride, Edgar Allan Poe, and J. K. Rowling's Harry Potter, and SFFWorld drawing parallels with the movies Se7en and Dark City.

A review by Strange Horizons compared Bone Song to Laurell K. Hamilton's Anita Blake: Vampire Hunter series and noted that in both works, prejudice against undead creatures (vampires in Anita Blake and zombies in Bone Song) serves as a metaphor for real-life racism. SF Site gave the book a generally unfavorable review, but complimented the "interesting character" of the female lead Laura Steele.
