= John Meaney =

British science fiction author (born 1957)

John Meaney (born 1957 in London) is a British science fiction author.

== Biography ==
Meaney grew up in London and Slough, England with his brother Colm (who is not the same as the Star Trek actor Colm Meaney). He has studied martial arts since childhood and has a black belt in shotokan karate. Meaney originally studied at Birmingham University and holds a combined degree in Physics and Computer Science from the Open University. He has done postgraduate work at Oxford University and is a part-time IT consultant.

== Writing career ==
Meaney's science fiction began appearing in 1992 with "Spring Rain" in the July 1992 issue of Interzone. His novelette "Sharp Tang" was shortlisted for the British Science Fiction Association Award in 1995. His first novel, To Hold Infinity, was published to critical acclaim in 1998. Along with his second novel, Paradox, it was on the BSFA shortlists for Best Novel in 2001 and 1999 respectively. To Hold Infinity was also selected as one of the Daily Telegraph's "Books of the Year". Bone Song represented a change from his first four novels, being a blend of crime and fantasy rather than science fiction. By 2006, he had published over a dozen short pieces. His works have been considered to be influenced by cyberpunk. He was described by The Times as "the first important new SF writer of the 21st Century".

== Works ==
- To Hold Infinity (Bantam/Transworld, 1998)
- The Whisper of Disks (Interzone, October 2002)

=== Nulapeiron Sequence ===
1. Paradox (Bantam/Transworld, 2000)
2. Context (Bantam/Transworld, 2002)
3. Resolution (Bantam/Transworld, 2005)

=== Tristopolis ===
1. Bone Song (Gollancz/Orion, 2007)
2. Dark Blood (Gollancz/Orion, 2008) - released as Black Blood in the US in 2009
3. Tristopolis Requiem (Self published, 2018)

=== Ragnarok ===
1. Absorption (Gollancz/Orion, 2010)
2. Transmission (Gollancz/Orion, 2012)
3. Resonance (Gollancz/Orion, 2013)

=== Writing as Thomas Blackthorne ===
1. Edge (Angry Robot, 2010)
2. Point (Angry Robot, 2011)
