= Ducks Away! =

2016 picture book by Mem Fox and Judy Horacek

- First edition, designed by Judy Horacek
- Author: Mem Fox
- Illustrator: Judy Horacek
- Language: English
- Genre: Children's picture book
- Published: 2016 (Scholastic Australia)
- Publication place: Australia
- Media type: Print (hardback)
- Pages: 30 (unpaginated)
- ISBN: 9781760158514
- OCLC: 945969497

Ducks Away! is a 2016 children's picture book written by Mem Fox and illustrated by Judy Horacek. Published by Scholastic Inc., It is about a mother duck and her five ducklings attempting to cross a bridge, one by one, and fall off the bridge into the river below. The duck becomes more and more agitated until she, with the last of her ducklings dropping into the water and their encouragement, decides to follow them.

== Publication history ==
- 2016, Australia, Scholastic Australia ISBN 9781760158514
- 2018, USA, Scholastic, Inc. ISBN 9781338185669

== Reception ==
A review in Reading Time of Ducks Away! described it as "another classic bedtime tale" and wrote: "Captivating audiences from toddlers to young preschoolers, this picture book is vibrant, playful and utterly delightful". A Horn Book Magazine starred review found that "the text and art work together beautifully.." and concluded: "Add this to your counting book shelves right quack, er, quick".

Ducks Away! has also been reviewed by Kirkus Reviews, Publishers Weekly, Booklist, School Library Journal, and The Wall Street Journal.

== See also ==
- 5 Little Ducks
- The Duckling Gets a Cookie!?
- List of fictional ducks
