= Possum Magic =

1983 picture book by Mem Fox

- First edition
- Author: Mem Fox
- Illustrator: Julie Vivas
- Cover artist: Julie Vivas
- Language: English
- Genre: Children's picture book
- Publisher: Omnibus Books
- Publication date: 1983
- Publication place: Australia
- Pages: 32 (unpaginated)
- ISBN: 978-01-5200-572-6

Possum Magic is a 1983 children's picture book by Australian author Mem Fox, and illustrated by Julie Vivas. It concerns a young female possum, named Hush, who becomes invisible and has a number of adventures. In 2001, a film was made by the American company Weston Woods and narrated by the author.

== Plot ==
The two main characters are Grandma Poss and Hush. Hush has been made invisible by Grandma to protect her from Australian bush dangers. The story details the duo's adventures as they tour Australia searching for the secret to Hush's visibility. It is a rhythmical story of Australia's varied landscapes and the animals in them.

== Development history ==
Fox wrote her first draft for Possum Magic in 1978, during a course in children's literature at Flinders University. Over five years, nine publishers rejected the draft. When it was accepted by Omnibus Books in Adelaide they asked Fox to reduce the book, then titled Hush the Invisible Mouse, by two-thirds (the original text ran four and a half pages without illustrations) and to change the mice to Australian animals to place emphasis on her Australian theme.

== Reception ==
Possum Magic is considered a classic in Australian children's literature.

Reviews of Possum Magic have generally been positive. The Canberra Times called it "a wonderful story, a proper quest amid familiar surroundings,...". Booklist wrote: "This agreeable tale from down under is peppered with Australia-isms, but there is a zest to the story that transcends the language barrier". Possum Magic has also been reviewed by Meanjin, School Library Journal, and Horn Book Guides

In 2014 it topped the Australian Booksellers Association list of 50 Favourite Kids’ Books.

It is Australia's best selling children's book with almost 5 million sales (as at 2017), and has continually appeared on best seller lists.

In 2017, the Royal Australian Mint struck a series of $1 and $2 coins to commemorate the book.

In 2021, researchers from Edith Cowan University were critical of teachers over-relying on titles such as Possum Magic in the classroom because classic stories were not culturally diverse. Despite finding Possum Magic included one illustration of a person of colour, the researchers expressed concern about books that featured animal characters, stating that stories about animals decreased the likelihood of children from minority backgrounds seeing characters representative of themselves. The researchers recommended teachers use more contemporary texts which better represent a culturally diverse society, in addition to existing classic titles such as Possum Magic. The research was criticised by two conservative media commentators.

== Adaptations ==
A stage show adaptation was developed by Monkey Baa Theatre Company and toured Australia in 2019. The adaptation was given a positive review by Judith Greenaway for ArtsHub Australia, who called it "detailed and beautiful and respectful of the original work".

In 2023, The Australian Ballet School adapted the book into an original ballet, with music by Claire Cowan, and choreography by Loughlan Prior.

== Awards ==
- 2009 BILBY Award shortlist
- 2004 Young Australians Best Book Awards (YABBA) Hall of Fame member
- 1994 Canberra's Own Outstanding List (COOL) Picture Book Award winner
- 1991 COOL Award runner-up
- 1990 CCBC Choices book
- 1987 Kids Own Australian Literature Awards (KOALA) Younger Readers winner
- 1986 IBBY Australia Honour Diploma for illustration
- 1984 Children's Book of the Year Award: Picture Book shortlisted, and highly commended
- 1984 Ethel Turner Prize for Young People's Literature winner
