= Good Night, Sleep Tight (Fox book) =

Australian children's picture book by Mem Fox

- Author: Mem Fox
- Illustrator: Judy Horacek
- Cover artist: Judy Horacek
- Language: English
- Genre: Children's picture book, nursery rhyme
- Published: 2012 (Scholastic Australia)
- Publication place: United States
- Media type: Print (hardback)
- Pages: 32 (unpaginated)
- ISBN: 9781742832579
- OCLC: 785957545

Good Night, Sleep Tight is a 2012 children's picture book by Mem Fox and illustrated by Judy Horacek. It is about Skinny Doug, a babysitter, who uses some nursery rhymes to help his charges, Bonnie and Ben, to sleep.

== Publication history ==
- 2013, USA, Orchard Books ISBN 9780545533706
- 2012, Australia, Scholastic Australia ISBN 9781742832579

== Reception ==
A Booklist review found it "a fun book that will remind parents to pass along the golden oldies".

Good Night, Sleep Tight has also been reviewed by Kirkus Reviews, Publishers Weekly, School Library Journal, Horn Book Guides, The New York Times, Reading Time, Educating Young Children, Scan, and Children's Book and Media Review.

== See also ==
- Bonnie and Ben Rhyme Again
