= Books+Publishing =

Australian trade magazine

- Categories: Books, news, bookselling, publishing, book reviews
- Frequency: Quarterly
- Circulation: 2900 (January 2018)
- Founded: 1921; 105 years ago
- Company: Books and Publishing Pty Ltd
- Country: Australia
- Based in: Melbourne
- Language: Australian English
- Website: www.booksandpublishing.com.au
- ISSN: 2201-5892

Books+Publishing (formerly Bookseller+Publisher and Australian Bookseller & Publisher) is a news outlet reporting on the Australian book industry. Published as a website with daily newsletters and a print magazine, the outlet produces industry news about publishing, bookselling, libraries, rights sales, literary awards and literary festivals, as well as author interviews and pre-publication reviews of Australian and New Zealand books.

== History ==
Books+Publishing was founded as a magazine in 1921 by Daniel Wrixon Thorpe as the Australian Stationery and Fancy Goods Journal, at a time when there were few Australian retailers solely focused on the sale of books. The magazine has been continuously published ever since, changing its name to Ideas in 1937. The name then changed to Australian Bookseller & Publisher in 1971 when the D. W. Thorpe company was taken over by Thorpe's daughter, Joyce Nicholson.

In 1971, the company began publishing the Weekly Book Newsletter—an offshoot of the magazine—containing weekly book-industry news and became colloquially known as the Blue News, because of the blue paper it was printed on.

The D. W. Thorpe company was sold to Reed Reference Publishing in 1992, then sold to R. R. Bowker in 2001, and the company became Thorpe-Bowker in 2003. (R. R. Bowker is currently owned by ProQuest.)

The word 'Australian' was dropped from the magazine's title at the start of 2006 to become Bookseller+Publisher, partly in acknowledgement of Australia's growing role as a publishing and bookselling hub for the entire Asia-Pacific region. In 2006 the Weekly Book Newsletter became an online newsletter that is emailed to subscribers and available on the website.

The publication was renamed to Books+Publishing in 2012, and the newsletter Library News that Thorpe-Bowker had acquired in 2007 was folded into the renamed publication. Two offshoot newsletters carrying book reviews, the Reviews Newsletter and the Junior Newsletter, began in 2012, and one year later the first Daily Newsletter was sent out to subscribers containing news about the book industry on a daily basis, which is republished in the Weekly Book Newsletter. The Think Australian Newsletter and Think Australian Junior Newsletter were established in 2017, containing news about the sale of rights of Australian titles for an international audience.

In 2018, Thorpe-Bowker sold the entire Books+Publishing publication, including the magazine, newsletters and website, to Thorpe-Bowker General Manager Gary Pengelly, under the company Books and Publishing Pty Ltd. In 2020, the business decided to postpone publishing the magazine, Think Australian and its book-review newsletters due to COVID-19.
