= Vladimir Radunsky =

Russian-American artist and author

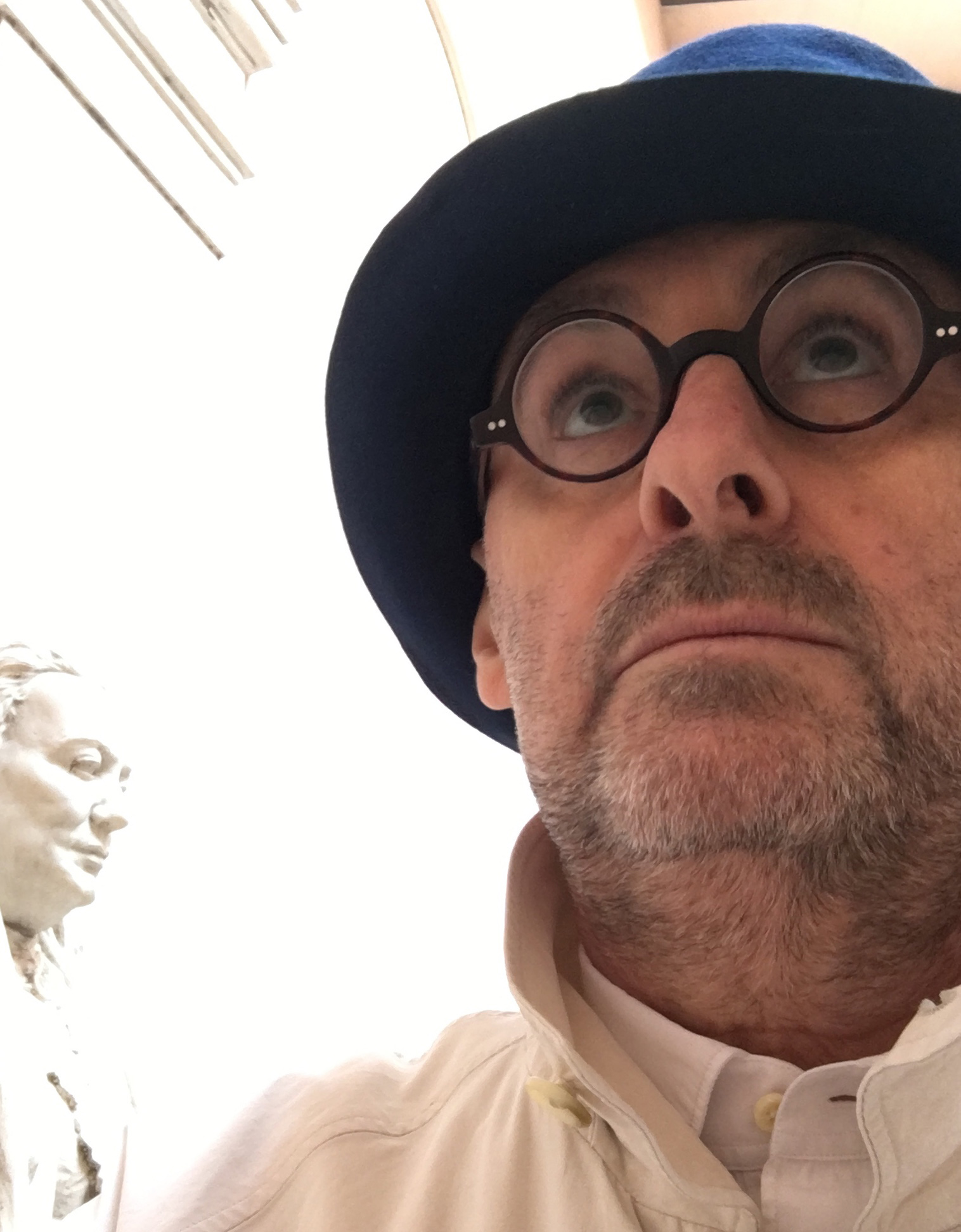
- Born: March 1, 1954; Perm, Russia
- Died: September 11, 2018 (aged 64); Rome, Italy
- Known for: Design, illustration, writing
- Spouse: Evgenia Radunsky
- Website: Official website

Vladimir Radunsky (1 March 1954 – 11 September 2018) was a Russian-born American artist, designer, author and illustrator who lived in Rome.

== Life and work ==
Born in the Russian city of Perm, Vladimir Radunsky grew up in Moscow where he studied fine art, design and architecture. In 1973, he studied at the Moscow Architectural Institute. In 1982, he emigrated to New York, became a US citizen, and continued his work as a graphic designer, producing mainly art books and children's books.

Radunsky produced very different types of books, such as a book of shapes for young readers, Square Triangle Round Skinny (a set of four books shaped the way their titles suggest); Discovery, a lyrical poem by Nobel-prize winner Joseph Brodsky about the discovery of America, and What Does Peace Feel Like?, a compilation of conversations with children during school visits in the US and Europe. His interactive book, Le Grand Bazar, subtitled For people with imagination age 5 to 105 (published in Paris by Edition du Panama), requires the reader to use scissors, pen, and stapler. Boy Meets Girl is to be read forward, backward, upside down and inside out. The Mighty Asparagus (Harcourt) combines the works of Italian Renaissance painters with his own paintings in a collage. The Hip-Hop Dog, written by Chris Raschka (HarperCollins), is hip-hop poetry for children, where graffiti art has migrated from walls into a printed book.

For his exhibition at Milanese gallery Nina Due and, subsequently, at the Palazzo delle Esposizioni in Rome, Radunsky presented a unique collection of clothes for animals. Among the works that he designed were an anaconda's wedding dress, a horse's riding breeches, and a hippo's bathing trunks.

For the new production of the ballet Don Quixote at the Roman Teatro dell'Opera's 2017–2018 season, Radunsky created the set and costumes. The libretto, originally created in the middle of the nineteenth century by the French Choreographer Marius Petipa, inspired Radunsky to design the set as an enormous pop-up book.

== Death and family ==
Having been diagnosed with multiple myeloma years earlier, Radunsky died at a hospital near his home in Rome at the age of 64. He and his wife Eugenia Uritsky, whom he married in 1987, had two daughters and moved to Italy when the children were young because he wanted "to be surrounded by beautiful things".

== Bibliography ==
- Mother Goose of Pudding Lane author Chris Raschka 2019, Candlewick Press
- If I met Bemelmans… 2015, Buffalo Zine (issue No.3)
- Alphabetabum author Chris Raschka 2014, The New York Review Children's Collection
- On a Beam of Light: The Story of Albert Einstein author Jennifer Berne 2013, Chronicle Books
- Advice to Little Girls author Mark Twain 2013, Enchanted Lion Books
- Consigli alle bambine di Mark Twain 2010, Donzelli
- Hip-Hop Dog author Chris Raschka 2010, HarperCollins
- You? 2009, Harcourt Children's Books
- Where The Giant Sleeps author Mem Fox 2007, Harcourt Children's Books
- Because... in collaboration with Mikhail Baryshnikov 2007, Ginee Seo Books
- Le Grand Bazar 2006, Les Editions Du Panama
- Fire! Fire! Said Mrs. McGuire author Bill Martin Jr 2006, Harcourt Children's Books
- I Love You Dude 2005, Gulliver Books
- Boy Meets Girl in collaboration with Chris Raschka 2004, Seuil
- What Does Peace Feel Like? 2004, Simon & Schuster/Anne Schwartz Books
- The Mighty Asparagus 2004, Harcourt/Silver Whistle New York Times Best Illustrated Books Award
- # 1 (one) 2003, Viking
- Manneken Pis, a Simple Story of a Boy Who Peed on a War 2002, Atheneum/Anne Schwartz Books
- # 10 (ten) 2002, Viking
- Square Triangle Round Skinny (four books in a box) 2002, Candlewick Press
- Table Manners in collaboration with Chris Raschka 2001, Candlewick Press
- My Dolly author Woody Guthrie 2001, Candlewick Press
- Bling Blang author Woody Guthrie 2000, Candlewick Press
- Howdi Do author Woody Guthrie 2000, Candlewick Press
- Discovery author Joseph Brodsky 1999, Farrar, Straus & Giroux
- An Edward Lear Alphabet author Edward Lear 1999, HarperCollins Children's Books
- Yucka Drucka Droni in collaboration with Eugenia Radunsky 1998, Scholastic
- Telephone author Kornei Chukovsky translated by Jamey Gambrell 1996, North-South Books
- The Maestro Plays author Bill Martin Jr 1994, Henry Holt and Co.
- The Story of a Boy Named Will author Daniil Kharms translated by Jamey Gambrell 1993, NorthSouth Books
- Hail to Mail author Samuel Marshak translator Richard Pevear 1990, Henry Holt and Company
- The Pup Grew Up author Samuel Marshak translator Richard Pevear 1989, Henry Holt and Co.
- The Riddle author Adele Vernon 1987, Dodd, Mead & Co.
