= All That I Am (novel) =

2011 novel by Australian writer Anna Funder

- First edition cover
- Author: Anna Funder
- Publisher: Viking Press
- Publication date: 29 August 2011
- ISBN: 978-0-670-92039-6

All That I Am is Australian writer Anna Funder's first fictional work, published in 2011. It follows characters affected by the Nazi regime in pre-war Germany and Britain.

== Plot ==
A young Ruth Becker meets and marries a leading journalist, Hans Wesemann, while visiting her cousin Dora in Munich in 1923. Together they participate in left wing activism. Ten years later, as Hitler becomes Chancellor of Germany, Ruth and Hans, together with Dora Fabian and her lover, playwright Ernst Toller, are forced to flee to London. In exile in London, always in danger of being deported by the British Government, they dedicate themselves to making the world realise how dangerous Hitler is. The storytelling shifts from the point of view of Toller shortly before his suicide in New York in 1939, and the sole survivor Ruth in Sydney in 2001.

All of the characters in All That I Am are real people, but Funder has reconstructed their stories, because a lot of the memories and moments that compel the story cannot be verified. In her notes Funder writes: "I have made connections and suppositions, for that I take full responsibility".

== Characters ==
- Ruth Becker - One of two storytellers, begins as a young woman in Germany and falls in love with Hans Wesemann, but recollects events from her home in Sydney in 2001.
- Hans Wesemann - Journalist and satirist who finds himself lost in translation when exiled to London.
- Dora Fabian - Forceful and passionate cousin of Ruth.
- Ernst Toller - A poet and reluctant activist prone to long bouts of severe depression. He is also recollecting past events, but it is before his suicide in New York in 1939.
- Berthold Jacob - A journalist who suffers under the Nazi regime, and helps engineer the escape of the other four.

== Publication ==
All That I Am was published by Penguin Books on 29 August 2011.

== Critical reception ==
All That I Am garnered generally positive reviews and many awards.

The book was called "superb" by The Spectator, "strong and impressively humane" by the Times Literary Supplement), "a beautiful ensemble novel of Graham Greene'esque proportions" by Weekendavisen, "an essential novel" by Colum McCann, and "imaginative, compassionate and convincing" by The Wall Street Journal.

David Marr wrote: "In language of admirable simplicity she explores the shadowy ambiguities lurking in her characters – ambiguities that have always fascinated her: the good that comes with bad and the bad with good". ABC Radio Perth critic Miriam Borthwick said "It is a riveting portrayal of real people's lives lived in terrible circumstances". The Guardian, while generally praising the work, was conscious and somewhat wary of the literary reconstruction of real events, concluding that it was "a studiously researched fantasy about the past that stages an almost self-annihilating debate about reconstruction".

Published in 25 countries, the novel was BBC Book of the Week and Book at Bedtime in the UK, and The Times (London) Book of the Month for May 2012.

== Awards ==
=== Wins ===
- 2011 Western Australian Premier's Book Awards
- 2012 Miles Franklin Award
- 2012 Australian Book Industry Award (ABIA), Book of the Year
- 2012 Barbara Jefferis Award
- 2012 Australian Independent Booksellers Indie Book Award for Literary Fiction
- 2012 Australian Booksellers Association Nielsen BookData Booksellers Choice Award

=== Nominations ===
- International Dublin Literary Award
- Commonwealth Book Prize
- Prime Minister's Literary Award
- Australian Literature Society Gold Medal
- Adelaide Festival Awards for Literature (Fiction Prize)
- Victorian Premier's Literary Award
- Australian Society of Authors Asher Literary Award
