= Berthold Jacob =

German journalist and pacifist (1898–1944)

Berthold Jacob (12 December 1898 in Berlin – 26 February 1944 in Berlin) was a German journalist and pacifist during the Interwar period.

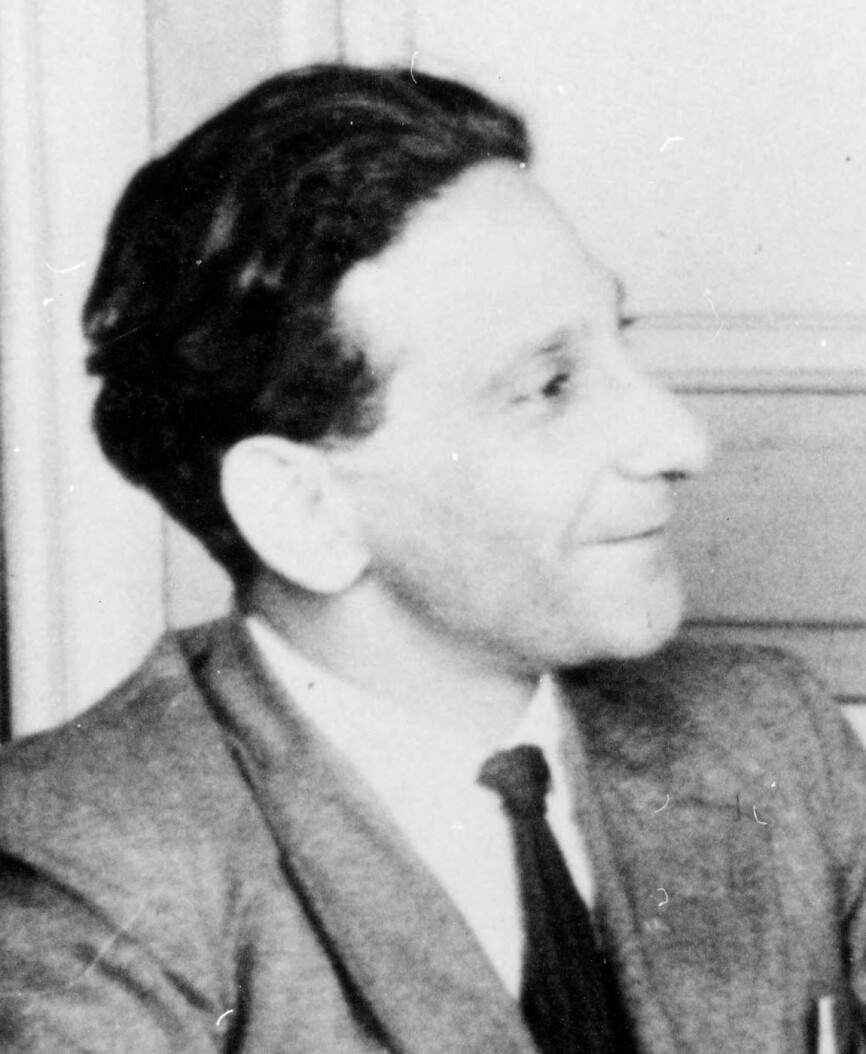
Berthold Jacob

== Biography ==
Jacob was born into a Jewish family in Berlin, on 12 December 1898, the son of art salesman and silk manufacturer David Jacob. He served on the Western Front in 1918 during the First World War, which led him to become a pacifist. He became a journalist in 1920, and went on to become a radical critic of German militarism, writing articles about German secret rearmament and the Feme murders. From 1925 to 1928 he wrote a series of articles for Die Weltbühne under the pseudonym "Old Soldier". In 1928, Jacob was prosecuted for treason and imprisoned until 1929. He joined the Social Democratic Party in 1928, but later moved to the Socialist Workers' Party upon its foundation in 1931. Jacob left Germany for Strasbourg in 1932, where he set up an independent press service, and was stripped of his German citizenship the following year.

Having been enticed to Basel, Switzerland, by undercover Gestapo agent Hans Wesemann, Jacob was kidnapped on 9 March 1935 and taken across the German-Swiss border to Weil am Rhein. He had known Wesemann for some time and had served as best man at Wesemann's wedding. Wesemann was later sentenced to three years in jail for the kidnapping. The case was investigated by Swiss police officer Anton Ganz, who went to London to interview such people as Dora Fabian and Karl Korsch. The subsequent death of Fabian alongside her friend Mathilde Wurm led to concern that they had been murdered rather than committed suicide which was the verdict of the coroner's court. This contributed to the climate of opinion which led to a successful campaign for Jacob's release from Nazi Germany. This campaign was based on Swiss diplomatic pressure on the German government and German exile protests.

Upon being returned to Switzerland in September 1935, Jacob was deported to France. Here, he continued his work until the outbreak of the Second World War. He was interned with his wife in Southern France between 1939 and 1940, and attempted unsuccessfully to acquire a visa for the United States. They managed to escape from Marseille, travelling to Portugal in 1941. Jacob was one of the refugees aided by Varian Fry. However, he was once again kidnapped by the Gestapo in Lisbon and held in the Gestapo prison at Prinz-Albrecht-Straße, Berlin. Owing to the harsh treatment he endured, Jacob died in the Berlin Jewish Hospital on 26 February 1944.

== Works ==
- 1925: Weissbuch über die Schwarze Reichswehr (with Emil Julius Gumbel) Berlin: Verlag der Neuen Gesellschaft,
- 1925: Deutschlands geheime Rüstungen? Berlin: Verlag der Neuen Gesellschaft
- 1929: Verräter verfallen der Feme: Opfer, Mörder, Richter 1919–1929 (with Emil Julius Gumbel, Ernst Falck) Berlin: Malik
- 1934: Die Hindenburg-Legende. Verlag La République, Strasbourg
- 1934: Wer? Aus dem Arsenal der Reichstagsbrandstifter. Strasbourg
- 1934: Memoiren des Stabschefs Röhm. (Anonymous) Strasbourg
- 1936: Das neue deutsche Heer und seine Führer: Mit einer Rangliste des deutschen Heeres und Dienstaltersliste (nach dem Stande von Mitte August 1936).
- 1936: Warum schweigt die Welt? (with contributions from Carl von Ossietzky, Georg Bernhard, Wolf Franck, Jack Iwo, Alfred Kantorowicz, Rudolf Leonhard, Paul Westheim) Paris: Éditions du Phénix
- 1937: Weltbürger Ossietzky. Ein Abriss seines Werkes (with a biography of Ossietzkys, and foreword by Wickham Steed) Paris: Éditions du Carrefour

== See also ==
- List of peace activists
