= Christopher Kremmer =

Australian journalist

- Born: 1958 (age 67–68); Sydney, Australia
- Occupations: Journalist and author
- Employer: University of New South Wales
- Notable work: Inhaling the Mahatma; The Carpet Wars: From Kabul to Baghdad; Bamboo Palace

Christopher Kremmer (born 1958) is an Australian journalist and author. He is known for his book-length fiction and nonfiction, short stories, and journalism. Over the past thirty years, he has written several books that explore different regions and cultures around the world, including the Bamboo Palace and Inhaling the Mahatma. As of 2023, he is a senior lecturer at the University of New South Wales.

== Background ==
Kremmer was born in 1958 in Sydney, Australia. He arrived in Hanoi, Vietnam in 1993, while working as a correspondent for the Australian Broadcasting Corporation. His two-year long stay there prompted him to write about the neighboring country of Laos.

== Career ==
As a journalist, Kremmer has covered a range of subjects, including war, politics, and social change. He is the author of several books, including Stalking the Elephant Kings: In Search of Laos, The Carpet Wars: From Kabul to Baghdad: A Ten-Year Journey along Ancient Trade Routes, Bamboo Palace, Inhaling the Mahatma, and The Chase.

Stalking the Elephant Kings: In Search of Laos, which was published in 1997, presents a look at life in Laos over the course of two decades since the communist takeover of the country 1975 and provides a commentary on the history of the region under its former monarchy. The book was published in the United States, Britain, and Thailand. In 2003, it was updated and re-issued as Bamboo Palace.

The Carpet Wars: From Kabul to Baghdad: A Ten-Year Journey along Ancient Trade Routes, which was published in 2002, is a portrait of Afghanistan and Islam in crisis. It was published in nine countries, including Japanese and Spanish translations, and became a bestseller in several countries.

Inhaling the Mahatma, which was published in 2008, is a personal history of India that focuses on the events and people that the author experienced during the decade he spent living and working in that country. It is a personal and lyrical account of India, focusing on the Northern Indian temple town of Ayodhya and the Indian literary and religious classic, the Ramayana.

In 2011, Kremmer published his debut novel, The Chase, which is based on the life of his father, who rode racehorses in the 1940s and '50s in Sydney.

Kremmer has also contributed to the anthology "Courage, Survival, Greed", which was commissioned by Sydney PEN. In his essay, he examines the concept of greed from various perspectives, including social, historical, economic and cultural. The anthology also features essays from Anna Funder and Melissa Lucashenko, who explore the themes of courage and survival respectively. The collection of essays provides a nuanced look at contemporary issues facing Australia.

=== Academia ===
In 2013, Kremmer was awarded a doctorate in creative arts from Western Sydney University, where he had undertaken research into truth claims in the historical novel. In 2014, he became senior lecturer at the Centre for Advancing Journalism in the Graduate School of Arts and Social Sciences at the University of Melbourne. He now teaches literary and narrative journalism practice at the University of New South Wales in Sydney. He is an honorary fellow of the Australia India Institute and has conducted research as an honorary research fellow at the University of Wisconsin-Madison in the United States.

=== Awards ===
Kremmer's book "Stalking the Elephant Kings: In Search of Laos" won the inaugural Qantas/City of Brisbane Prize for Asia-Pacific Travel Writing in 1997. His book "The Carpet Wars: From Kabul to Baghdad: A Ten-Year Journey along Ancient Trade Routes" was shortlisted for The Age Book of the Year in 2002. "Inhaling the Mahatma" was shortlisted for the Australian Book Industry Awards for Best Nonfiction Book.
