= John Funder =

Australian medical researcher

John Watson Funder AC is an Australian endocrinologist and medical researcher. He is particularly known for his work in cardiovascular endocrinology. As of 2026 he is professor of medicine at Monash University, honorary professor at the University of Queensland, and professorial associate at his alma mater University of Melbourne. He is also a distinguished scholar at the Hudson Institute of Medical Research in Melbourne.

== Early life and education ==
John Watson Funder was born in Adelaide, South Australia.

He was educated at the University of Melbourne, where he graduated with an arts degree in 1964 and then medicine (MBBS) in 1965. Moving into research, he was awarded a PhD and MD in 1971.

== Career ==
Funder joined Prince Henry's Institute of Medical Research (now Hudson Institute of Medical Research) in 1973 as a senior research fellow, later becoming senior principal research fellow and deputy director.

In 1990 Funder resigned as a senior research fellow of the National Health and Medical Research Council to become director of the Baker Medical Research Institute, a position he held until 2001. He then rejoined Prince Henry's Institute as a senior fellow.

From 2008 until 2011, Funder was director of research strategy at Southern Health (now Monash Health).

Having published hundreds of scientific papers (578 by 2013, which had received over 20,500 citations), Funder is an expert in mineralocorticoid receptors and aldosterone biology. His 2008 paer "Endocrine Practice Guidelines for Primary Aldosteronism" is one of his most highly cited works.

He has served as a consultant to many pharmaceutical companies as well as academic and philanthropic organisations.

As of July 2026 Funder continues to undertake research collaborations at Hudson Institute of Medical Research, the University of Sydney, and colleagues around the world. He is professor of medicine at Monash, honorary professor at the University of Queensland, and professorial associate at Melbourne University. He is also a distinguished scholar at the Hudson Institute.

== Other roles ==
Funder was president of the Australian Society for Medical Research (1979) and the Endocrine Society of Australia (1984), and chairman of the International Society for Endocrinology (1996–2000). He has chaired reviews of research institutes in many Australian and New Zealand cities, as well as the Victorian Health Promotion Foundation (1977-2004).

As of 2006, Funder had the following roles: a professorial fellow at the Centre for Neuroscience at the University of Melbourne; a director of the Harold Mitchell Foundation, and a member of the board of the Royal Women's Hospital in Melbourne. He has written book reviews for Australian Book Review.

He was a director of the board of the Passe & Williams Foundation, which supports ear, nose and throat (ENT) research, for 28 years, from 1995 until his retirement in 2023.

As of July 2026, Funder is a patron of SANE Australia, which he has formerly chaired. He is on the editorial board of 11 international journals.

== Recognition and honours ==
On 26 January 1998, Funder was appointed an Officer of the Order of Australia, for service to medicine (particularly in the field of endocrinology research) and in the development of public policy across a range of primary health issues.

Funder was awarded the Centenary Medal in 2001 for service to the commercialisation of health and medical research.

In 2015, at the 2015 Australia Day Honours, Funder was appointed the top honour a Companion of the Order of Australia for eminent service to medicine, particularly to cardiovascular endocrinology, as a renowned researcher, author and educator, to the development of academic health science centres, and to mental illness, obesity, and Indigenous eye-health programs.

Other honours awarded to Funder include:

- 1980: Membre de l'Ordre des Palmes academiques of the French Government
- 1984: Eric Susman Prize of the Royal Australasian College of Physicians
- 1987: Glaxo Medal
- 2002: Sidney H Ingbar Distinguished Service Award
- 2008: Novartis Prize for Hypertension, American Heart Association
- 2009: Elected fellow of the Royal College of Physicians
- 2010: Honorary Doctor of Laws, Monash University
- 2010: Research Australia Leadership and Innovation Award
- 2013: Honorary Doctor of Medical Science, University of Melbourne
- 2013: Endocrine Society's Robert H. Williams Award for Distinguished Leadership
- 2014: Honorary Doctor of Medicine, University of Sydney
- 2014: ISH Tigerstedt Lifetime Achievement Award
- 2016: Ipsen Award for Endocrinology of the Fondation Ipsen (Paris)

== Personal life ==
Funder married psychologist Kate Funder (née Brennan). Their children are author Anna Funder, Joshua, and Hugh. Joshua, a Rhodes scholar, has written wrote a book about the evacuation of Gallipoli through the eyes of his great-grandfather, Stan Watson, an engineer from Adelaide who was responsible for building the pier at Anzac Cove.

Funder is a keen winemaker.
