= Dora Fabian =

Dora Fabian (née Heinemann; 28 May 1901 – 31 March or 1 April 1935) was a German socialist and anti-Nazi activist, born in Berlin.

She was the daughter of Else Levy Heinemann and Hugo Heinemann, a socialist lawyer who defended trade unionists and political activists in court. This environment nurtured her interest in politics and during the First World War she became a member of the Independent Social Democratic Party of Germany.

In 1924 she married Walter Fabian, a fellow social democratic activist.

She became disillusioned with the politics of the Social Democratic Party of Germany and joined the Socialist Workers' Party of Germany.

== Exile ==
After being detained by the Nazis in March 1933, she decided to leave Germany rather than risk re-arrest. She fled first to Prague, then Paris, finally arriving in London on 8 September 1933. She had an invitation from John Paton, a leading figure in the Independent Labour Party. She had sufficient funds to be allowed to stay for a month with the proviso she did not work.

== Death ==
Fabian was found dead alongside Mathilde Wurm in their flat at 12, Great Ormond Street, Bloomsbury, London, on 4 April 1935, and both were found to have died either on 31 March or on 1 April 1935. While suicide was suspected, the deaths were treated as suspicious.

The coronial inquest attracted a great deal of interest and was attended by Fenner Brockway, James Maxton, Ben Riley as well as by Ernst Toller, who travelled from Paris to attend. Karl Korsch was a witness, having been in a relationship with Fabian. When the verdict came, it was that the two women had "committed suicide while of unsound mind". However, this was not accepted by many members of the German anti-Nazi refugee community or their British supporters.

== In literature ==
Fabian's life, her dangerous secret activist work in London, and the circumstances around her suspicious death and the inadequate coronial inquest that followed, is featured in the novel All That I Am by Australian author Anna Funder.
