= Walter Fabian =

German socialist politician, journalist and translator (1902-1992)

- Born: Walter Max Fabian; 24 August 1902; Berlin, Germany
- Died: 15 February 1992 (aged 89); Cologne, Germany
- Education: Berlin, Freiburg iB., Gießen & Leipzig
- Occupations: journalist politician author
- Political party: SPD; SAPD
- Spouse(s): 1. Dora Fabian; (1901-1935); 2. Ruth Loewenthal (1907-1996) -later Ruth Aris-Fabian; 3. Charlotte "Carlotta" Gries; 4. Annemarie Lorenz
- Children: Annette (8 March 1940-?) -later Annette Antignac
- Parents: Richard Fabian (father); Else Hosch (mother)

Walter Fabian (24 August 1902 – 15 February 1992) was a German socialist politician, journalist and translator. During the Nazi years he became a resistance activist and political exile.

Auch ich träume manchmal davon dass es Deutschlands Bestimmung sein möge, den Abgrund zwischen Ost und West zu überbrücken, indem es die sozialistische Wirtschaftsbasis des Ostens mit der politischen Demokratie des Westens verbindet.

-- Walter Fabian in conversation with Jörg Wollenberg, 15 October 1985

Sometimes I dream that it might be Germany's vocation to bridge the space between east and west, by combining the socialist economic framework of the east with the political democracy of the west.

== Life ==
=== Early years ===
Walter Max Fabian was born in Berlin. Richard Fabian, his father, was a self-employed interior architect who would have much preferred to be a musician. Visitors to the house included Bruno Walter. Powerfully progressive political currents in the family home came primarily from his mother, born Else Hosch. The Fabians' social circle also included leftwing intellectual heavyweights such as Hugo Haase and Kurt Rosenfeld. He attended what was then the Mommsen Gymnasium (secondary school) in Berlin's Charlottenburg quarter. He was not quite twelve when war broke out, and by the time he left school he was already a vocal backer of those calling for peace.

=== Weimar Germany ===
After leaving school he went on to study Philosophy, Pedagogy, History and Economics at Berlin, Freiburg iB., Gießen and Leipzig. In 1924 he concluded his studies with a doctoral dissertation on the philosopher Friedrich Wilhelm Foerster, entitled "Das Problem der Autorität bei Friedrich Wilhelm Foerster". He had been contributing to SPD newspapers since 1920. After receiving his doctorate he became a committed member of the German Peace Society ("Deutsche Friedensgesellschaft" / DFG) and of the Association of Committed School Reformers ("Bund Entschiedener Schulreformer" /BESch). In addition he joined the Saxony branch of the Social Democratic Party ("Sozialdemokratische Partei Deutschlands" / SPD) itself.

It was also in 1924 that he married the author-journalist Dora Fabian. The marriage, described by one thoughtful writer as "brief but friendly", would be over by the time of Dora's death in London, under circumstances that have never been entirely clear, during the early summer of 1935.

In 1924 he also became an editor at the Ernst-Oldenburg Verlag (publisher) at Leipzig, supporting the party's educational work. The next year he took on the responsibilities of political editor with the party newspaper, "Chemnitzer Volksstimme". Unlike Dresden, the home of the Royal Saxon Court and Saxony's traditional administrative capital, he saw Chemnitz as a workers' city, without the liberal intellectual pretensions of Leipzig, but rather Saxony's equivalent to the Manchester of a few decades earlier, when Engels undertook his socio-political researches in England's cotton capital. He perceived Chemnitz as a more appropriate fulcrum for his own interests in the promotion of the labour movement and pacifist politics. In Chemnitz Fabian also became a member of the SPD's regional party executive. Additionally, from 1928 he was producing two Dresden based SPD opposition news sheets, "Sachsendienst" and "Sozialistische Information". He used these "pulpits" to attack the Coalition Chancellor, Hermann Müller, over the government re-armament programme, producing slogans such as "school meals before battle ships" ("Schulspeisung statt Panzerkreuzer"). (Hermann Müller was, like Fabian a member of the SPD.)

Er war ein ausgezeichneter Redner, sowohl in seiner Rhetorik wie im Wesen. Dabei war ihm die bombastische Rhetorik absolut fremd. Walter Fabian sprach ruhig und ueberzeugend wie ein guter Lehrer oder Dozent. Er war der typischer Wissensvermittler und kein Propagandist.

-- Arno Behrisch in Festschrift fur Walter Fabian zum 75. Geburtstag

He was an outstanding speaker, in terms both of his presentation and the substance of his arguments. Bombastic rhetoric was completely alien to him. Walter Fabian spoke quietly and persuasively, like a good teacher or lecturer. He delivered information, not propaganda

Fabian had relocated to Dresden in 1928. There he was increasingly in demand as a lecturer and speaker, notably among the city's Young Socialists. His uncompromising pacifism and his talent for public speaking meant he was always seen as a leftwing comrade within the party, and viewed with suspicion by many in the party hierarchy. He also attracted a growing band of mostly young leftwing followers from inside the party. In the end the leadership lost patience. He was subjected to a "speaking ban" at the end of 1930, and in September 1931 he was excluded from the SPD.

Along with around 1,000 Young Socialists in Saxony, Walter Fabian now joined the Socialist Workers' Party ("Sozialistische Arbeiterpartei Deutschlands" / SAPD) launched, formally, shortly afterwards. Both the Communist Party and the SPD had, by the later 1920s, become increasingly shrill in their mutual antagonism and contempt, to the point where by 1931 both party leaderships had expelled large numbers of their "extremist" members. Meanwhile, the seemingly unstoppable rise of populism persuaded many of the expelled party members, (as well as some of the more thoughtful party activists who had not been expelled) that the only way to avert a Nazi government was for the political left to unite in opposition to the Nazi tide. The SAPD was born of that conviction even though, with the benefit of hindsight, its emergence is frequently seen simply as a further example of the way the Nazis were able to encourage and exacerbate fragmentation of Germany's political left during the run-up to their own successful power-grab. Within the SAPD Walter Fabian was elected regional chair for East Saxony. Then, in March 1932 at the party's launch conference in Berlin, he was elected to the party national executive. Despite being set up as a national party, the SAPD in reality depended on two regional power bases. Due in part to the reputation and actions of Walter Fabian, one of these was East Saxony. The other, also a major industrial region (and also an area where the Nazis enjoyed strong support), was in the western part of Silesia, in and around Breslau (as Wrocław was then known). Fabian and August Enderle set about creating a party newspaper: the "Sozialistischen Arbeiter-Zeitung" (SAZ) was launched in September 1932 with Walter Fabian its editor-in-chief. The first few editions were produced in Berlin after which the SAZ operation was transferred to Breslau.

=== Nazi Germany ===
At the second general election of 1932, in November, the Nazi vote share fell back from 37% to 33% suggesting that, under the democratic procedures then in place, the Nazi wave might have peaked. Nevertheless, the combined vote share of the Nazis and Communists ensured that the Reichstag remained deadlocked, with no obvious way that any coalition could emerge with sufficient parliamentary backing to support a stable government. Despite the parliamentary stalemate, however, following deft political machinations the Nazis, with the conditional agreement of President Hindenburg, took power at the end of January 1933 and lost no time in transforming Germany into a one-party dictatorship. Many on the left remained confident that the "terrorist government" launched at the end of January 1933, though tolerated or in some cases supported by other "conservative" forces, would be short-lived. However, Fabian calculated that it would be foolish to place much confidence in the prospect of a rapid collapse of the Nazi régime. Although political activity was not actually banned until March 1933, the broad ground rules for the government's approach to political opposition were already on display by the end of January. He moved from Breslau to Berlin where, using the name Kurt Sachs, he managed to live in "relative anonymity" and continue with his (now illegal) political activities. Meanwhile, Dora Fabian, who had been campaigning alongside her husband for a united left to confront the Nazi menace since at least as far back as 1931, despaired of the continuing bickering between the leftwing political forces and resigned from the SAPD during the first few weeks of 1933. She was arrested in Berlin in March 1933, but released a few days later. Her belief that plans existed for her imminent re-arrest was almost certainly correct, and her decision to forestall re-arrest by escaping to Prague well founded. By September 1933 she had ended up in London.

At a clandestine "party conference" in March 1933 Walter Fabian was re-elected to the SAPD party executive. By 1934, many party comrades, having been arrested, he had emerged as leader in Germany of the underground party. He succeeded in continuing to live in anonymity, as far as the authorities were concerned, and during that year he travelled regularly between Berlin and Paris which, together with Moscow, was becoming the destination of choice for Germany's exiled opposition politicians. It was also during this period that Fabian began a long period of political cooperation with the man who later became the SAPD's most famous member, Willy Brandt.

=== Paris exile ===
In January 1935 Fabian was lucky to avoid arrest after a party comrade passed him a message that, under torture, the comrade had found himself unable to remain silent as to Fabian's whereabouts and false identity. Unable to return to his own apartment, he managed to avoid the Gestapo and a few days later crossed the snow-covered mountains into Czechoslovakia, still, at this point, an independent country. He was accompanied by his second wife, Ruth. They made their way to Prague and from there, via Austria and Switzerland, to Paris, where by now the SAPD had established their exiled leadership team which Walter joined. Ruth also worked with the party and during 1935 was deprived, in her absence, of her German citizenship by the government back in Berlin. It not clear why Walter Fabian suffered the same sanction only on 5 August 1937. In Paris he was involved, above all, in the party's press section. As part of this he set up the SAPD's "Documentation Office" which gathered, collated and collected helpful cuttings from newspapers.

As a member of the leadership of an illegal (in Germany) opposition party exiled in Paris, Walter Fabian was also part of the antifascist "Lutatia Circle" (named after the Paris hotel where they held their meetings). This was the context within which, in 1936, he was one of a number of prominent socialists, inspired by the French prime minister Léon Blum, who tried to put together a German Popular Front (in exile) in order more effectively to oppose the Nazis. Others involved included Heinrich Mann, Rudolf Breitscheid and Willi Münzenberg. The idea came to nothing, however. Meanwhile, the exiled leadership of the SAPD, by now headed up by Jacob Walcher, was moving decisively to the political left and, possibly more importantly, to a pro-Stalin line, taking their lead from the Soviet Communist Party in Moscow where Stalin was embarking on an industrial scale purge of his political opponents, whether actual, potential or merely suspected. Walter Fabian was still contributing as a journalist in the German language news publications produced in Paris, and as stories seeped out about the developments in Moscow he was disinclined to avoid reporting them. He also wrote critically about Moscow's attacks on the POUM ("Partido Obrero de Unificación Marxista"), a Spanish Marxist party and quasi-military movement that came to prominence in the Spanish Civil War and, having fallen foul of Stalin, saw several of its leaders tortured and/or killed by emissaries sent from Moscow. Because of his criticism, in 1937 Fabian was expelled from the SAPD. It was the second time in five years that he had been expelled from a political party, and for the rest of his life he avoided further membership of any party.

He did, however, form a "resistance group" under the title "Neuer Weg" ("New Way"), and devoted himself to producing the movement's eponymous news-magazine. Others involved in "Neuer Weg" included Peter Blachstein and Erwin Ackerknecht, two former SAPD comrades who had been expelled from the party at the same time as Fabian.

=== War years ===
The Germany army invaded Poland in September 1939: The French and British governments responded by declaring war on Germany a few days later, although military assistance to Poland was not significant. For most of the residents of Paris and London there was little immediate impact before May 1940 when the Germany army invaded France. By that time thousands of people who had been forced to escape from Germany to Paris for reasons of political activism and/or race had been identified as enemy aliens and arrested. (Similar steps were taken by the London government.) Walter and Ruth Fabian were briefly held in Paris and then moved to a detention centre at Marolles, a run down village near Blois. Walter Fabian was able to use his time here to read Nausea, a prescient and subsequently well regarded novel by a then little known novelist called Jean-Paul Sartre. He was also able to produce a few articles for newspapers in Switzerland. Some 25,000 German and Austrian political internees were by now being transferred to vast internment camps in the southwest of the country. In order to avoid that fate Walter Fabian volunteered for service in the French Foreign Legion at the start of January 1940, which involved service in North Africa. Ruth seems to have returned briefly to Paris where Annette, the couple's daughter, was born early in March 1940. She then headed back south with her baby and settled in the "Free zone", administered from Vichy by a puppet government and still, at this stage, permitted a significant measure of autonomy by the Germans.

Walter Fabian found time to record the highlights of his time in the French Foreign Legion in a diary which, many decades later, his daughter discovered:

- 18 April 1940

Gewehr putzen und Exerzieren, Kartoffel schälen, Kohl waschen, Küche säubern, Geschirr trocknen, Fass rollen, Stufen und Hof fegen.

Cleaning the rifle and doing exercises, peeling potatoes, washing cabbages, drying the dishes, rolling barrels, sweeping the stairs and the yard

- 16 June 1940

Annette 100 Tage alt. Tage-lang ohne Zeitung. Zerfetzte Radionachrichten. Nichts von Ruth. Aber wann kann man schreiben? Jetzt fehlen die Adressen!

Annette 100 days old. The whole day without a newspaper. Radio news garbled. Nothing from Ruth. But when does she get time to write? Now I've lost the addresses!

His commitment to pacifism and his intellectual approach meant that Walter Fabian was very far from being an ideal recruit for the Foreign Legion. In the end he spent three months imprisoned in a "military library": he later spent two months in a "small hospital". There was plenty of time for reading and writing. He wrote – according to his own recollections 40 years later – "hundreds of letters to Ruth and to his friends", and also kept a diary. However, his unsuitability for military service having been conclusively demonstrated, Ruth Fabian was able to extract her husband from the French Foreign Legion by the end of the year. He returned from North Africa, disembarking at Marseille on 8 December 1940.

During 1941/42 the Fabians worked in Marseille and in Aix-en-Provence with the Emergency Rescue Committee set up by Varian Fry on the initiative, some said, of Eleanor Roosevelt. The work, apparently unpaid, involved organising emigration from France to the United States of America for refugees from Nazi persecution. Jewish sources stress the extent to which those rescued were Jews while leftwing political sources stress they extent to which they were political refugees. Many, like Walter Fabian himself, were both, but those charged with prioritising whom to help first always insisted that the only criterion was the extent of the danger which each individual would be in so long as he or she remained in Europe. Organising entry visas for the United States, transit visas for Spain and Portugal and – often most difficult of all to obtain – French exit visas was hugely time consuming, especially because victims of Nazi persecution often arrived in Marseille without identity papers.

From his own diary it appears that as early as December 1940 Walter Fabian received notification that the family's own tickets from Lisbon to New York were "paid for", but in February 1941, still in Marseille, he received a letter from his father's old friend, Kurt Rosenfeld now in New York, warning that there was hardly any work for German emigrants arriving stateside. It is not clear whether Fabian himself ever seriously considered moving to America. The family settled in southern France. Ruth, once a junior lawyer in Berlin, now earned money by teaching German to French school children. Walter Fabian combined journalism with his other activities but money was short. He undertook writing and translating contracts for publishers in the United States and in Switzerland. There was talk of taking a job selling lottery tickets in the local library and there were times when, reportedly, he seriously considered volunteering for a return to North Africa and service in the French army.

Meanwhile, the Germans were progressively tightening their grip on the "Free zone". The police - with honourable exceptions - were increasingly operating according to instructions received from the Gestapo: Gestapo officers were a growing presence on the city streets. Obtaining French exit visas for refugees seeking to emigrate across the Atlantic was becoming harder. Acting on the instructions of the Gestapo, during the Summer of 1942 the French police closed down the escape programme operated by Varian Fry's Emergency Rescue Committee out of Marseille. As Jewish socialists the Fabians were doubly at risk from the Nazi persecution programme. As the risk of arrest and internment (and, from 1942, deportation to a death camp in Germany) intensified, they undertook a dramatic escape to Switzerland in October 1942.

=== Sanctuary in Switzerland ===
Through his international journalistic contacts Walter Fabian already had contacts in Switzerland. Nevertheless, it is possible that he was only on account of his daughter that he was permitted to cross the frontier into the country. According to a rule provided by the Swiss Justice and Police department and dated 18 June 1940, "fleeing civilians [were] to be turned back with the exception of women and children up to 16". Nevertheless, all three of them were able to cross the border, and after brief internment in a transit camp near Geneva they were placed in a refugee camp at Adliswil, just outside Zurich. Conditions in the refugee camp were poor, and it was only with help from the local religious community that Fabian was able to extricate his family from the place, after he had written a letter pleading for help to the Swiss education reformer, Elisabeth Rotten. It was in Adliswil that the marriage between Walter and Ruth Fabian broke apart. Walter Fabian relocated up the road to Zurich at the start of 1943 and relaunched his journalistic career. He and Ruth would remain lifelong friends. A brief tempestuous marriage to Charlotte "Carlotta" Gries appears to have been over by March 1944 (according to a diary entry) although a formal break was deferred to 1947.

Meanwhile, Switzerland itself still felt under dire threat of a German invasion, at least until the destructive extent to the German military machine had been subjected in the decisive Battle of Stalingrad became apparent during the course of 1943. Walter Fabian was initially banned from writing for the Swiss press as the authorities in Bern sought to avoid antagonising the northern neighbour. However, with the help of Walter Bösch, a senior editor at the Zürcher Tagesanzeiger (newspaper), he was able to work both as a translator and as an author under the pseudonym "Theo Prax" (a conscious contraction of the words "Theorie" and "Praxis"). He also embarked on a parallel career as a translator of French literature, with translations of works by Victor Hugo, Charles Baudelaire, Romain Rolland, François Mauriac and Yevgeny Tarle to his credit.

In Switzerland he also worked at one point as a music critic. He was an active member of the exiled German PEN International group and of the Society of the protection of German authors ("Schutzverband deutscher Schriftsteller" / SDS). At one point he led the SDS group in Switzerland, focusing his efforts on trades union training and the refugee organisation "ProAsyl".

=== Return to (West) Germany ===
War for Germany ended in May 1945. In 1947 his comrade of old, Peter Blachstein, came to visit Fabian in Switzerland. Blachstein, as he later wrote, had always thought that Walter Fabian would return to Germany as soon as possible, and greatly regretted that his old friend chose to live in Switzerland till 1957. However, Fabian was by this time well settled in Switzerland, and not at all convinced that democracy imposed by "the bayonets of occupying armies" or the events unfolding in the Soviet occupation zone were taking his home country in a positive direction. According to one source, at the heart of Fabian's hesitation about returning home was Karl Marx's precept "Liberation of the working class can only be achieved through the efforts of the working class" ("Die Befreiung der Arbeiterklasse kann nur das Werk der Arbeiterklasse selbst sein!"). In postwar Germany the focus was on survival, and then on reconstruction, rather than on the unfolding of a Marxist socio-political trajectory. Fabian received and repeatedly turned down a succession of apparently attractive job offers from Germany. On 8 October 1946 he rejected an offer from the former head of the socialist regional government in Saxony of 1923, Erich Zeigner, whom the Soviets had now appointed Lord Mayor of Leipzig. Zeigner wanted him to become editor in chief of the mass-circulation Leipziger Volkszeitung (newspaper). Fabian also turned down an offer from the US occupation zone to take over the editorship of the Frankfurter Rundschau from Emil Carlebach whose publisher's license was revoked by the US military administration for what were described at the time as unexplained reasons. (However, Carlesbach was a Communist Party member.) Fabian turned down a job offer from Radio Bremen in 1951 and, at the start of 1956, a job as political editor with Norddeutscher Rundfunk.

Walter Fabian's first visit to postwar Germany took place only on 10 October 1949. When he finally settled in West Germany in 1957, he did so without giving up his right of abode in Switzerland.

During the 1940s and 1950s, he had built up excellent contacts with the Swiss trades union movement, and this opened the door to the German Trade Union Confederation ("Deutscher Gewerkschaftsbund" / DGB) which emerged after 1949 and the lifting of the Nazi ban on trades union activity. In 1957, at the instigation of Otto Brenner, Walter Fabian was appointed editor in chief of the DGB's Gewerkschaftliche Monatshefte ("Trades Union Monthly"/ GMH) publication, a role which he held till 1970. Between 1958 and 1964 he also chaired the Deutsche Journalistinnen- und Journalisten-Union (Journalists' Union).

Working with the DGB came with its own challenges. The SAPD had lost its principal purpose after 1945 and most of its former members had switched to the more mainstream SPD: Walter Fabian had not. He remained true to his left wing "Luxemburgisch" convictions and rejected union attempts to pressure the "Gewerkschaftliche Monatshefte" into always backing the union line. It was as a result of continuing differences of approach that in 1970 Heinz Oskar Vetter, recently elected to chair the DGB, relieved Fabian of his responsibilities at the journal after thirteen years.

Since returning in 1957 Walter Fabian had engaged in the West German peace movement. He spoke out against the Viet Nam War, in support of rapprochement with Poland and in opposition to the various Emergency Powers Acts. After his work on the GMH ended he became a leading figure in the German Humanist Union, which he chaired from 1969 till 1973, and of the West German German-Polish Society (of which he became honorary president in 1977). In 1966 he also accepted an honorary professorship in Pedagogy from Frankfurt University.

== Awards and honours ==
- In 1970 Walter Fabian was a winner of the Carl von Ossietzky Medal from the International League for Human Rights.
- In 1991 he received a special honour from the prize committee of the Bert Donnep Prize, awarded by the Grimme Institute.
