= Vossische Zeitung =

Newspaper published in Berlin, Germany (1751–1934)

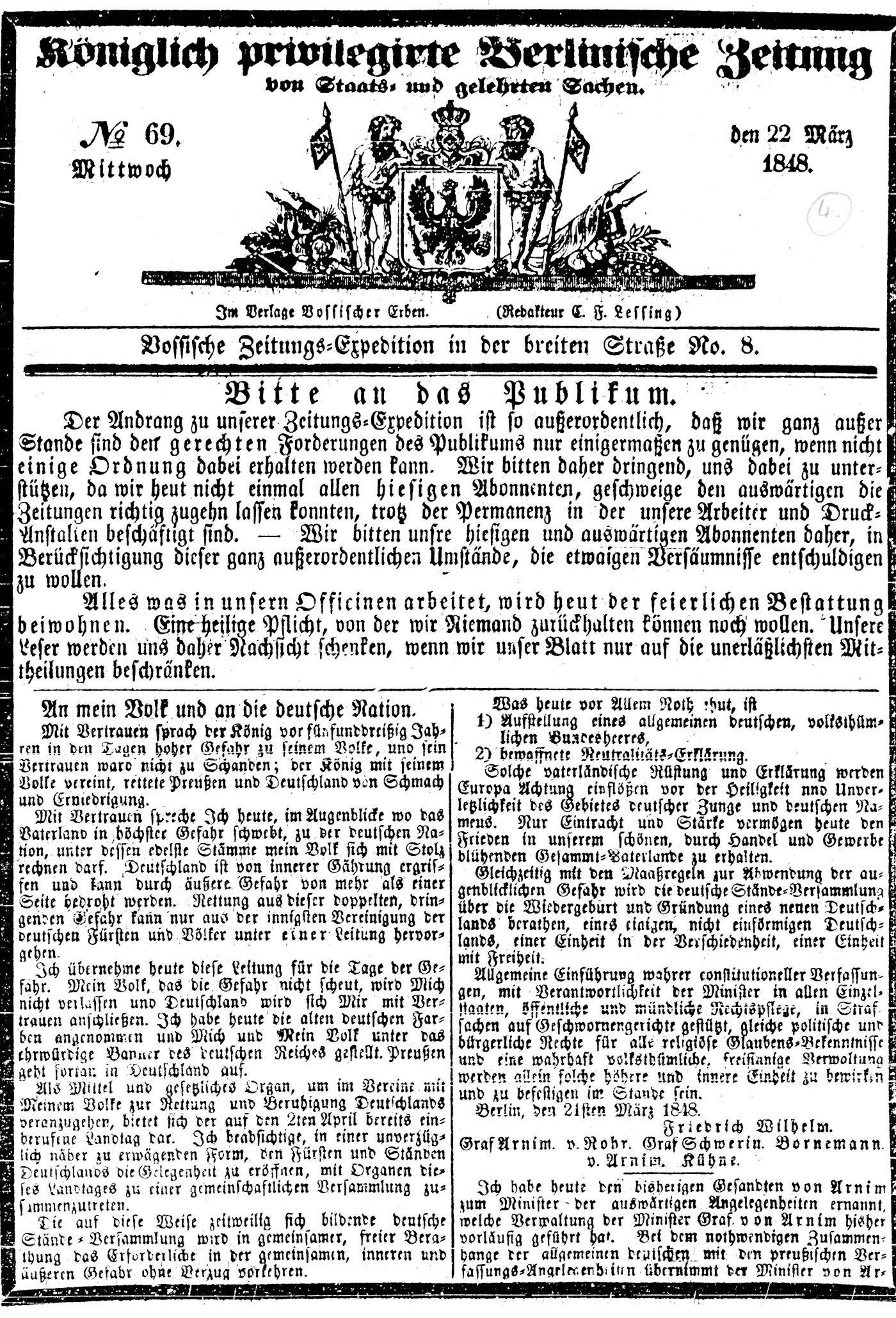
Title page from 22 March 1848, during the German revolutions of 1848–1849

The Vossische Zeitung (Voss's Newspaper) was a nationally known Berlin newspaper that represented the interests of the liberal middle class. It was also generally regarded as Germany's national newspaper of record. In the Berlin press it held a special role due to the fact that by way of its direct predecessors it was the oldest newspaper in the city. The name went back to Christian Friedrich Voss, who was its owner from 1751 to 1795, but Vossische Zeitung became its official name only after 1911. It ceased publication in 1934 under pressure from the Nazi state.

== Beginnings in Berlin ==
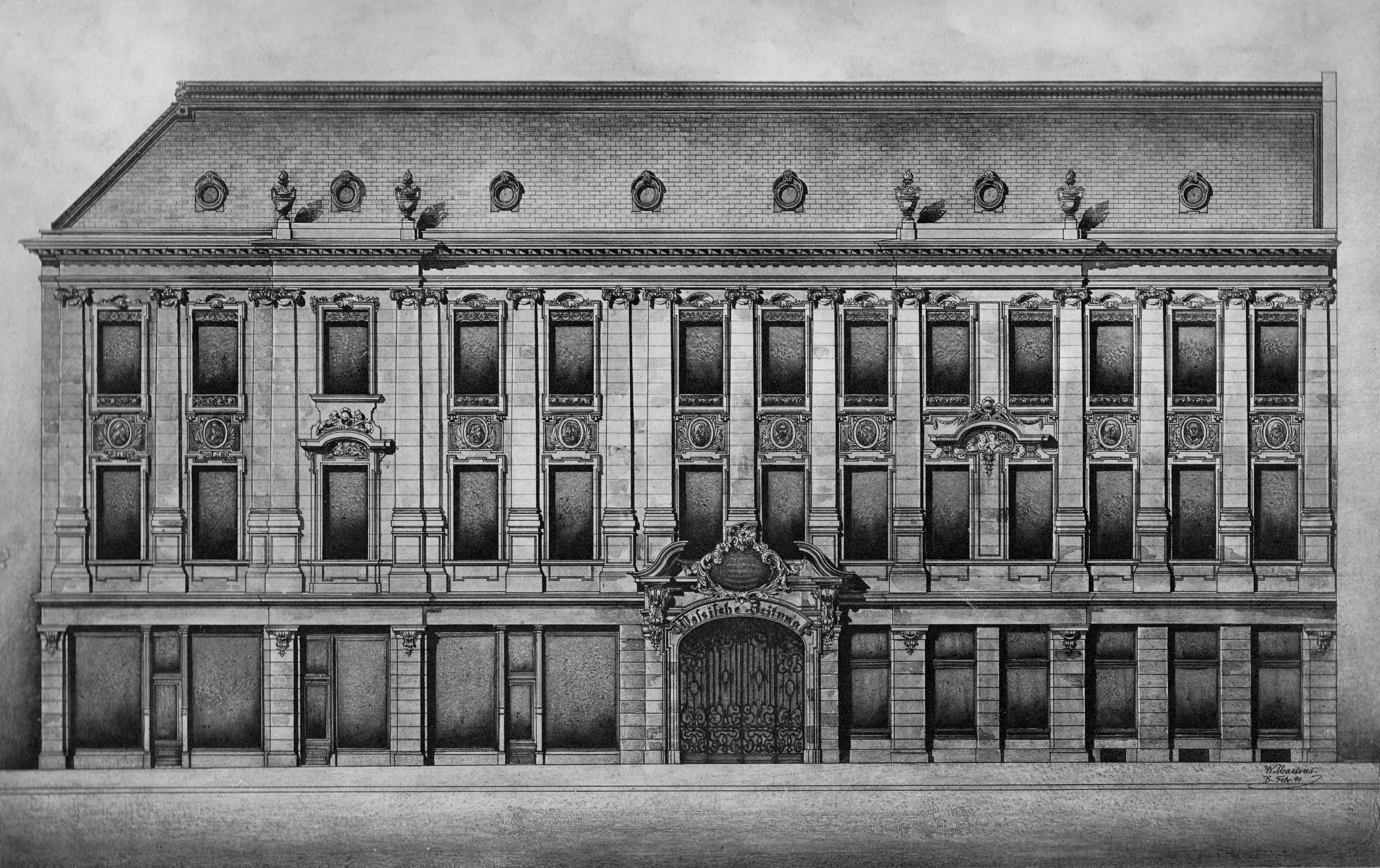
Printing house of Vossische Zeitung in Berlin, Breite Straße 8/9, year 1904

In the early 17th century, Christoff Frischmann collected and passed on to interested parties the news he received as postmaster of the Electorate of Brandenburg. Over time he systematized his news gathering, and he was ultimately given a mandate to maintain contacts throughout the "Holy Roman Empire of the German Nation" and to collect news from all important locations. His first printed newspapers came out in 1617 and appeared weekly, although not always regularly.

Frischmann and his brother Veit first called their newspaper editions 'Avisen' and then the Berliner Botenmeister Zeitung (Newspaper of the Berlin Chief Messenger). As early as 1618, copies regularly included correspondence from major cities in Western Europe. Censors often interfered with the reporting, especially because the paper's pro-Protestant stance during the Thirty Years' War prompted the Catholic Imperial Court in Vienna to demand that the Elector of Brandenburg take action against it. As a result, the paper could not appear for a time. Worn down by the constant worry about the continued existence of his newspaper, Veit Frischmann in 1655 left the concession to his printer Christoph Runge, who gave the paper a new title in 1658: Berliner einkommende Ordinar- und Postzeitungen (Berlin Incoming General and Postal Newspapers). In 1704, the book printer Johann Lorentz acquired the newspaper from Runge's widow, and his privilege was promptly confirmed by King Frederick I of Prussia. Lorentz called what was still Berlin's only newspaper the Berlinische Ordinaire Zeitung.

The various changes in ownership have led to ambiguities regarding the founding date of the Vossische Zeitung. The paper itself celebrated its 200th anniversary in 1904 and cited the corresponding year on its front page. The newspaper's age is most often based on its (almost) uninterrupted existence since 1617.

== Contested monopoly ==
Between 1704 and 1721, Lorentz had to battle Johann Michael Rüdiger, a competitor who had been granted a concession for a new paper in Berlin. In the end King Frederick William I revoked Lorentz's concession and transferred it to Rüdiger, who published the newspaper, now as the Berlinische Privilegirte Zeitung, without interruption and without significant changes, so that continuity was maintained for its readers.

Crown Prince Frederick, later King Frederick II (Frederick the Great), found the newspaper uninteresting. Because his father, King Frederick William I, had decreed that no expressions of opinion, and certainly no critical ones, could be printed, the paper contained only trivial news items, mainly about festivities at court, receptions, criminal cases and executions. Nor did the lack of competition provide any inducement to improve the journalistic quality of the paper. But on the second day after his accession to the throne in 1740, Frederick II commissioned his bookseller Ambrosius Haude to publish two new newspapers in Berlin, one in German, the second, which lasted only a year, in French. Thus, in June 1740, the Berlinische Nachrichten von Staats- und gelehrten Sachen (Berlin News of State and Learned Matters), also known as Haudesche Zeitung (Haude's Newspaper), the later Spenersche Zeitung (Spener's Newspaper, named after Johann Karl Spener) appeared. During the reign of Frederick II, two more newspapers were licensed, in 1750 and 1783, including the Gazette littéraire de Berlin.

On the question of press censorship, the king had expressed the opinion early on that "gazettes, if they are to be interesting, must not be censored". In 1742 censorship was abolished but used again during the first Silesian Wars and formally reintroduced in 1749, although with a royal mandate to keep interference in press freedom as low as possible under wartime conditions. Berlin's papers enjoyed greater freedom at that time than newspapers of other German states and were able to spread almost unhindered the ideas of the Enlightenment, to which Frederick II was committed.

== From Voss to Ullstein ==
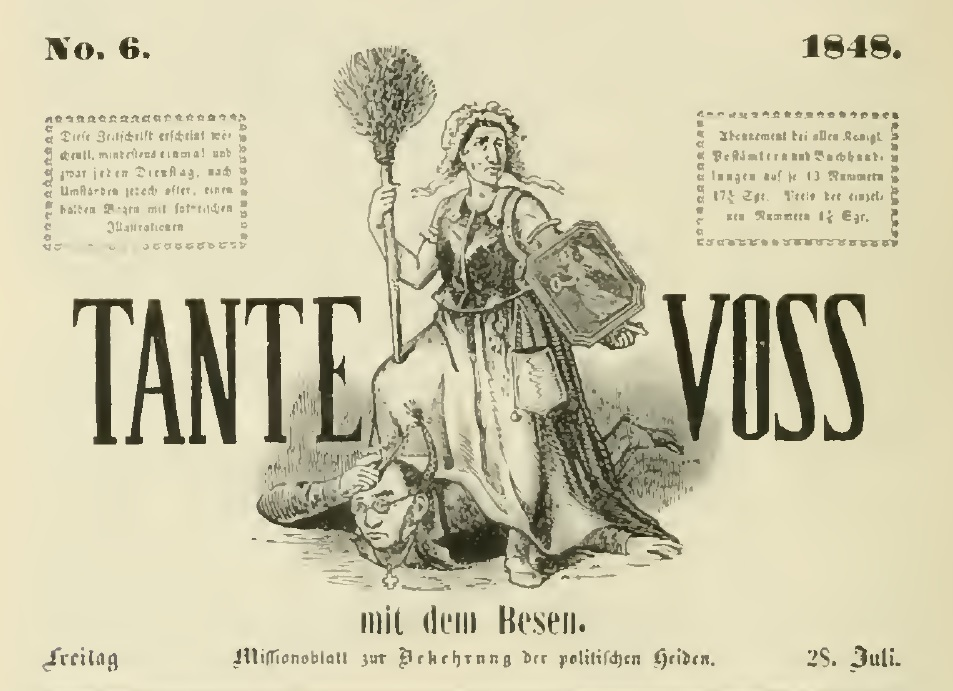
Satirical anti-Voss pamphlet, "Aunt Voss with a broom"

After Johann Rüdiger died in 1751 without a male heir, his son-in-law, the bookseller Christian Friedrich Voss, took over the newspaper. It was published three times a week and contained four pages. Just 150–200 copies per issue were printed, and it was sold only in bookstores. Soon the paper was known to Berliners as the Vossische and popularly as Tante Voss (Aunt Voss). Its real title as of 1785 was Königlich Privilegirte Berlinische Zeitung von Staats- und gelehrten Sachen (Royal Privileged Berlin Newspaper of State and Learned Matters), and in 1806 the header note 'Im Verlage Vossischer Erben' (In the Publishing House of Voss's Heirs) was added. This originally referred to Voss's daughter Marie Friederike, who was married to Karl Gotthelf Lessing, a brother of the poet Gotthold Ephraim Lessing. She had taken over the newspaper after a lengthy legal dispute in 1801 and thus brought it into the possession of the Lessing family (Carl Robert Lessing), who continued the business.

By about 1800 the newspaper had expanded to 16 pages, and in 1802 added business and advertising sections which were positively received. Even though it had become more comprehensive and varied, it remained journalistically quite superficial due to the again strict censorship which did not allow criticism of the principles of religion, the state, or public order. During the Napoleonic Wars, the editors of the newspaper – as well as King Frederick William III – fled to Breslau in Silesia. There, the paper appeared temporarily as the Schlesische privilegirte Zeitung (Silesian Privileged Newspaper). After returning to Berlin, it went on to be published daily between 1824 and 1875, and after that twice a day.

The paper represented the interests of the liberal middle classes. Beginning in 1843 it campaigned for the abolition of press censorship and was unambiguously on the side of the liberal forces in the 1848 revolution. The entire editorial staff attended the funeral of the 'March Fallen', the 183 civilian victims who died in Berlin on 18 March 1848, while fighting at the barricades against the Prussian troops of King Frederick William IV. When press censorship was abolished the same month, an 'Extra Edition of Joy' was published in Berlin: "Of all the rights the fulfillment of which has become ours and for which we hoped, liberated thought is the noblest, for it is the prerequisite of all that is to come." In the course of the conservative counter-revolution, however, after democratic newspapers were banned and printers closed in November 1848, the Vossische Zeitung qualified its progressive stance and had to deal with criticism and ridicule because of it.

In the mid-nineteenth century the newspaper was still the market and opinion leader in Berlin, but over the next decades it lost this position. Frequent differences among the shareholders blocked its technical and journalistic development. Towards the end of the 19th century, the Vossische maintained a solid position in the Berlin newspaper market but fell far short of the circulation of the new mass-circulation papers from the Ullstein, Scherl and Mosse publishing houses.

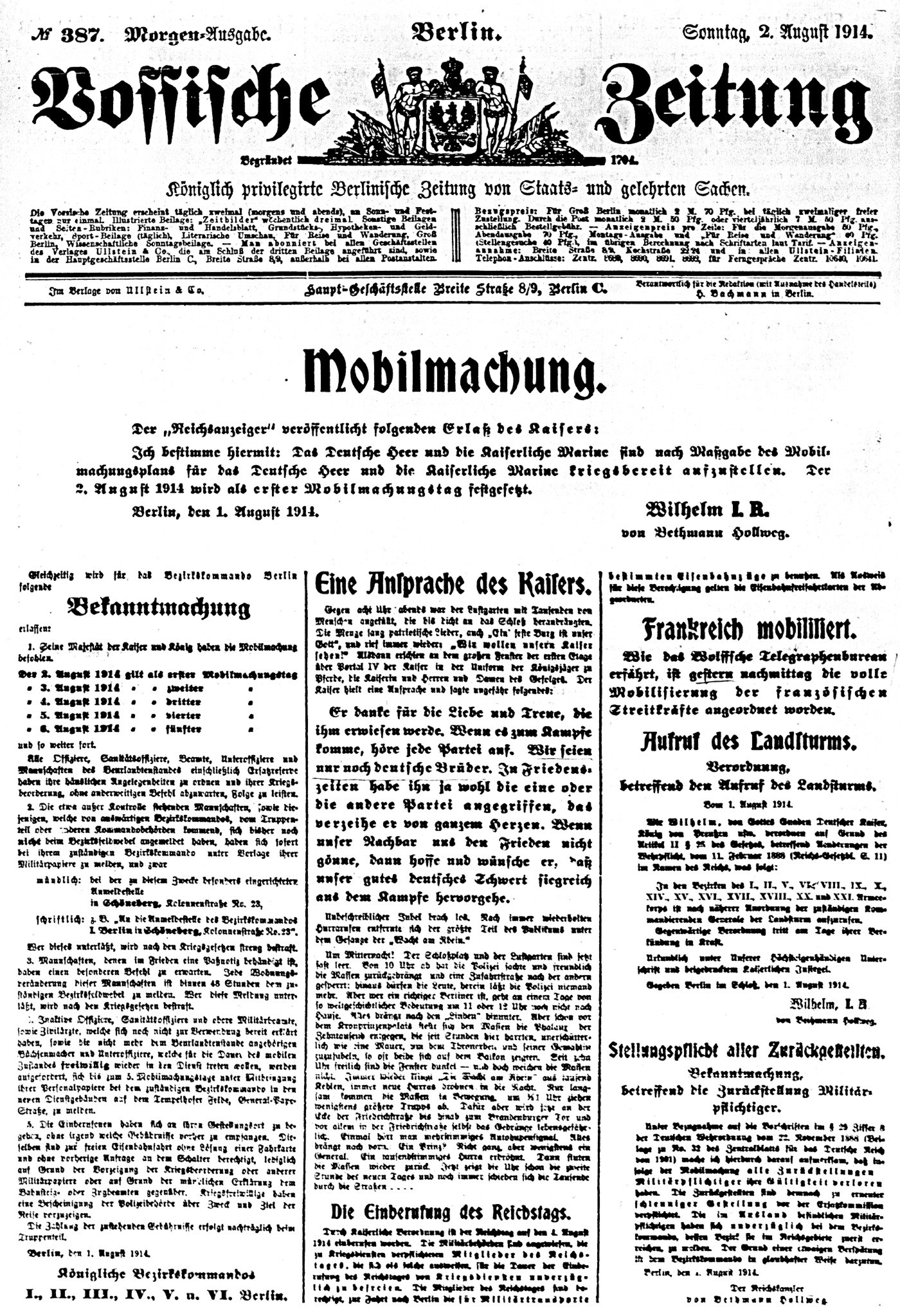
Title page from 2 August 1914, announcing mobilization for World War I

The paper's ownership structure had become more complicated; the company shares now belonged to various members of the Lessing and Müller families and were later partly taken over by the newspaper entrepreneurs Rudolf Mosse and August Huck. Through 1910 the paper retained the name Vossische Zeitung; the previous main title (Royal Privileged Berlin Newspaper of State and Learned Matters) remained only as a subhead. Shortly before his death in 1911, August Huck participated in a consortium that secured the shares of Lessing's heirs in the Vossische Zeitung. On 24 November 1913, the Berlin publishing house Ullstein & Co. took over the previously family-owned company for five and a half million marks, and as of 1 January 1914, the Vossische Zeitung was published by Ullstein.

With the collapse of the German Empire on 9 November, 1918, two days before the official end of World War I, the reference to royal privilege in the newspaper's title became irrelevant. It was dropped and the newspaper took on its final title: Vossische Zeitung: Berlinische Zeitung von Staats- und gelehrten Sachen (Voss's Newspaper: Berlin Newspaper of State and Learned Matters). The papers of the Ullstein publishing house spoke out in favor of the republic; in mid-November an editorial in the Vossische Zeitung called for the rapid convening of a representative national assembly.

During the Weimar Republic, the newspaper was considered a voice for democratic and liberal forces. It also provided a platform for liberally oriented Russian emigrants. The newspaper published a long obituary on its front page for Vladimir Dmitrievich Nabokov, an opponent of the tsar who was murdered by tsarists in Berlin in 1922. It also published the German translation of the novel King, Queen, Knave by Nabokov's son Vladimir Nabokov.

Although the Vossische Zeitung had an extensive news section and a qualified staff, its circulation never exceeded 75,000 copies. Between 1914 and 1933, it is said to have incurred a loss of around 30 million gold marks.

== Forced end ==
Not long after Adolf Hitler came to power at the end of January 1933, censorship authorities of the Nazi state began to significantly impede the work of the Vossische Zeitung. Numerous journalists who were out of favor with them, including many Jews, were expelled from their positions. A few weeks later, the Ullstein publishing house, including the newspapers it still published at the time, was Aryanized and taken over by the Franz Eher Verlag, the publishing house of the Nazi Party. When the National Socialist Schriftleitergesetz (editor law) came into force on 1 January 1934, Nazification of the German press was enforced, and publishers lost their influence on reporting and on the composition of editorial offices. On 24 March 1934, in a short note on the front page of the Vossische Zeitung – "To the Readers of the Vossische Zeitung" – the publisher stated:

In our opinion, the task of publishing a paper of the style of the Vossische Zeitung has come to an end. Thus, of our own free will, we have taken the painful but logical decision to shut down the Vossische Zeitung and no longer publish it after the end of the month.

On 31 March 1934 the last edition appeared. No effort was made to revive the paper after the fall of Nazi Germany in 1945.

== Prominent contributors ==
Many well-known figures wrote for the Vossische Zeitung. From 1751 to 1755, Gotthold Ephraim Lessing served as critic. Voss entrusted him with the editorship of the "Scholarly Article" and for nine months in 1751 Lessing also provided the monthly supplement "Latest from the World of Wit". The writer and novelist Willibald Alexis was an occasional contributor to the paper and supported it in its fight for freedom of the press in the run-up to the German revolutions of 1848–1849. Beginning in 1826, music critic and poet Ludwig Rellstab wrote for the Vossische Zeitung, as had his father, Johann Carl Friedrich Rellstab, who worked there between 1806 and 1813. The historian Johann David Erdmann Preuß, who was a friend of novelist Theodor Fontane, made several contributions between 1860 and 1865 to the history of Frederick the Great and his court. Between 1870 and 1890, Fontane himself wrote theater reviews of performances at the Berlin Playhouse for the Vossische. His sometime colleague and successor was the writer Paul Schlenther.

Hermann Bachmann, who joined the editorial staff in 1892, was deputy to editor-in-chief Friedrich Stephany from 1895 and became editor-in-chief in 1900. From 1914 he shared the editorship with Ullstein Publishing director Georg Bernhard, who had a strong influence on the newspaper but did not succeed Bachmann until 1920. He was editor-in-chief until 1930.

From 1911 to 1914, Doris Wittner was responsible for the newspaper's women's supplement. The most important columnist between 1887 and 1918 was Isidor Levy. In the 1920s, Richard Lewinsohn, also a contributor to the weekly Weltbühne under the pseudonym Morus, headed the business editorial department, and Monty (Montague) Jacobs became known as a feature writer and theater critic. In the spring of 1924 Kurt Tucholsky went to Paris as a correspondent of the Vossische Zeitung and the Weltbühne. Paul Schlesinger wrote his exemplary court reports under the nickname 'Sling' between 1921 and 1928, founding a new journalistic genre. Starting in November 1928, Erich Maria Remarque's novel All Quiet on the Western Front was published in advance in the Vossische Zeitung.
