= Karl Gotthelf Lessing =

German author (1740–1812)

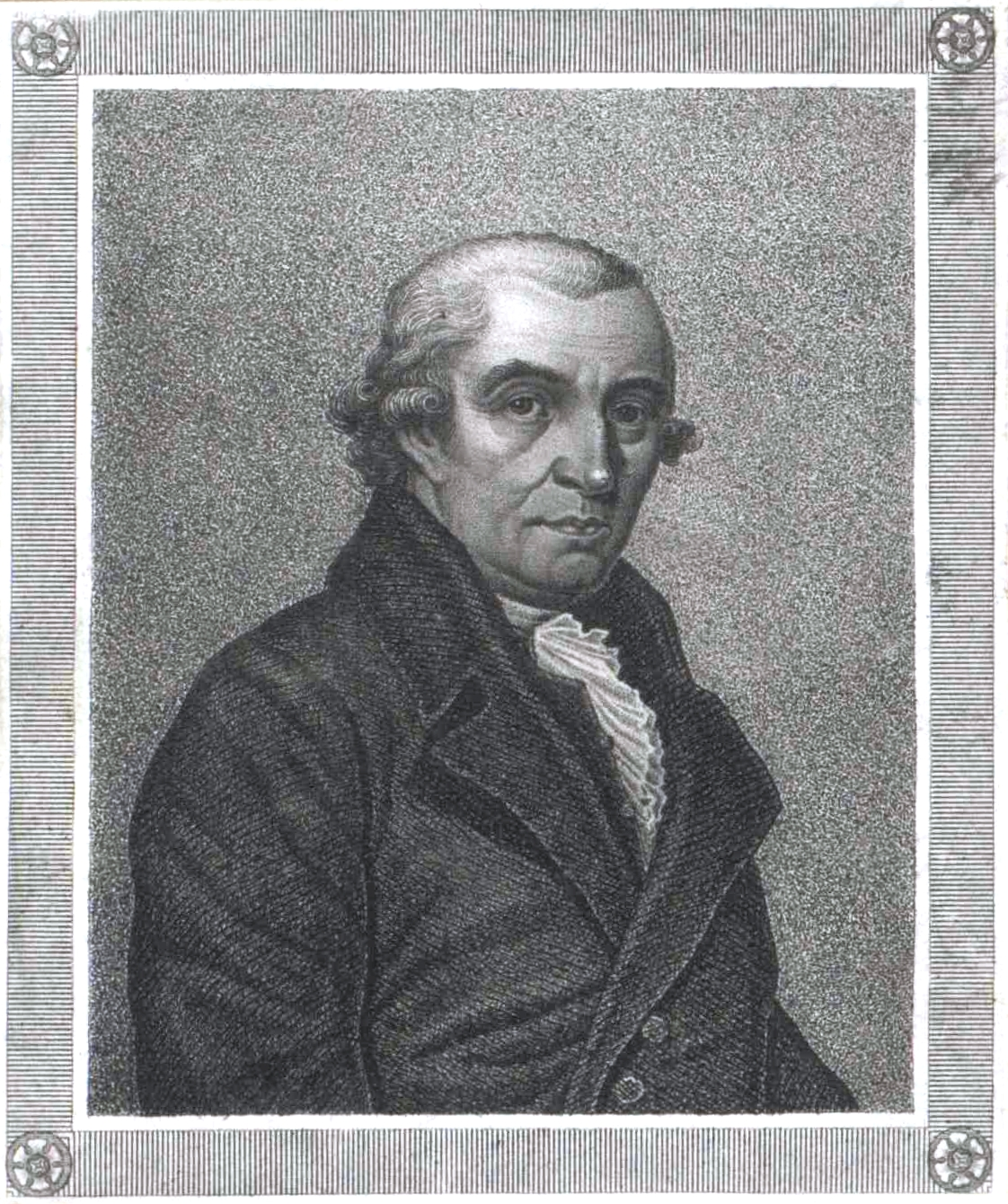
Karl Gotthelf Lessing

Karl Gotthelf Lessing (July 10, 1740 in Kamenz – February 17, 1812 in Breslau) was a German mint director, comedy writer and the first biographer and estate manager of his brother Gotthold Ephraim Lessing. Among other things, he was the later owner of the Vossische Zeitung, which was still called "Royal Privilegirte Berlinische Zeitung of State and learned matters" at this time.

== Biography ==
Karl Gotthelf Lessing was the son of the Protestant pastor Johann Gottfried Lessing (1693–1770), author of theological works, and Justine Salome Feller (1703–1777). He was the much younger brother of the German poet Gotthold Ephraim Lessing, had eleven other siblings and was the fourth youngest in the Lessing household. After attending the Latin school in his hometown, he attended the Electoral School in Meißen in 1756 and enrolled at the University of Leipzig in 1761 in order to study medicine. He moved to the law faculty, but did not complete his studies there, but instead went to Berlin to live with his brother in 1765. He married one of the heiresses of the Vossische Zeitung Marie Friederike Voß (1752-1828), daughter of the founder of the Vossische Zeitung Christian Friedrich Voß (1724–1795). In May 1770, Moses Mendelssohn gave him an assistant position at the Berlin General Mint Directorate, and in 1779 he was promoted to Mint Director in Breslau. In 1781, the mint entrepreneurs of the Prussian financial administration Daniel Itzig and Hirsch Simon persuaded him to have the so-called Hoym coins minted, which showed the date of the birthday of the Silesian Provincial Minister Karl Georg Heinrich von Hoym on the back instead of the usual inscription.

One of Karl Gotthelf Lessing's sons, Carl Friedrich Lessing the Elder, lawyer and chancellor of Prince Biron of Courland in Wartenberg, Poland, became the father of the newspaper publisher Carl Robert Lessing, the doctor Christian Friedrich Lessing and the painter Carl Friedrich Lessing, who in turn was the father of the Painters Heinrich Lessing and Konrad Lessing and the sculptor Otto Lessing.

Karl Gotthelf Lessing died on February 17, 1812 in Breslau, his wife on October 24, 1828 in Berlin.

== Quote ==
Denn Menschen vergnügt zu machen,
heißt: sie in den glücklichsten Zustand setzen

— Karl Gotthelf Lessing an Gotthold Ephraim Lessing, 22. März 1769

== Works ==
- G. E. Lessings Leben, nebst seinem noch übrigen litterarischen Nachlasse. Berlin: 1793–1795 (3 Bände).
- Schauspiele von Karl Gotth. Leßing (Berlin: bey Christian Friedrich Voß 1778)
- Schauspiele von Karl Gotth. Leßing (Berlin: bey Christian Friedrich Voß und Sohn 1780)

== Bibliography ==
- Karl Gotthelf Lessing – Schauspiele in drei Bänden. Hrsg. von Claude Conter. Band I. Hannover: Wehrhahn Verlag, 2007. ISBN 978-3-86525-001-8
- Karl Gotthelf Lessing – Schauspiele in drei Bänden. Hrsg. von Claude Conter. Band II. Hannover: Wehrhahn, 2007. ISBN 978-3-86525-002-5
- Wolfgang Milde (1985). "Lessing, Karl Gotthelf". Neue Deutsche Biographie (in German). Vol. 14. Berlin: Duncker & Humblot. p. 346. (full text online).
- Jörg Kuhn: Frau Münzdirektor M. F. Lessing, geborene Voß, und die Geschichte einer Grabplatte, in: Jahrbuch 2006 des Vereins für die Geschichte Berlins, Band LV, Berlin 2006, S. 55–64. ISSN 0522-0033
