= Kathleen Funder =

Australian social scientist

Dr Kate Funder
- Born: Kathleen Rose Brennan; 19 September 1941; Wonthaggi, Victoria, Australia
- Died: 13 July 1998 (aged 56); Melbourne, Victoria
- Other name: Kate
- Occupations: Psychologist, Social Scientist, Teacher
- Years active: 1964—1998
- Spouse: John Funder
- Children: Anna, Hugh and Joshua

Kathleen Rose "Kate" Funder, née Brennan, (19 September 1941 – 13 June 1998) was an Australian social scientist, who is recognised for her significant contribution to the Australian Institute of Family Studies as a principal research fellow. She was the mother of writer Anna Funder.

== Early life and education ==
Kathleen Rose Funder was born on 19 September 1941 in Wonthaggi, Victoria.

She took her BA in 1963, and later completed her postgraduate education at the University of Melbourne, receiving an MA in 1983 and a PhD in 1993.

== Career ==
After graduating, Funder taught English at the Geelong West Technical School and at the Emily McPherson College, before joining the Department of Education as an educational psychologist. She was a member of the Victorian Psychologists Registration Board, the Research Advisory Committee of the Victorian Association of Family Therapists, and as Chair of the Victorian Branch of the Australian Psychological Society, and chair of the Advisory Committee of the Psychology Department at Swinburne University.

In 1983, Funder joined the Australian Institute of Family Studies as a principal research fellow. This marked the beginning of a 15-year career at the institute. During this time she led and participated in research that determined family wellbeing – including divorce, single parenthood, care of children, and property rights. Funder was an influential voice in public debates and contributed to scholarly journals, mainstream press, and government inquiries.

== Other roles ==
Funder was an observer on the Family Law Council and a member of the Australian Law Reform Commission Reference on Children and the Law. She was also a member of the Committee on Family Research of the International Sociological Association and the National Council on Family Relations in the United States.

== Publications ==
Among her many publications were books Images of Australian Families: approaches and perceptions, and Remaking families: adaption of parents and children to divorce. Kathleen also contributed to Family Matters; a research journal of the Australian Institute of Family Studies.

== Personal life ==
Brennan married endocrinologist John Funder. Their children are author Anna Funder, Joshua, and Hugh.

== Death and legacy ==
Funder died on 13 June 1998 in Melbourne.

The Kate Funder Scholarships were established in 2008. The scholarships provide support for two medical students at the University of Melbourne's Newman College.

There are biographical cuttings relating to Funder at the National Library of Australia.

Funder Street in the Canberra suburb of Bruce is named after her.

== Published works ==
=== Books ===
- Images of Australian families: approaches and perceptions, 1991
- Settling down: pathways of parents after divorce, 1992
- Remaking families: adaptation of parents and children to divorce, 1996
- Family Law Evaluation 1996: parental responsibilities two national surveys (with Bruce Smyth), 1996
- Citizen Child: Australian Law and Children's Rights, 1996
- The workforce attachment of sole parents and ILO Convention 156 (report commissioned by The Department of Social Security) (with Christine Millward), 1993
- Safety net or snare?: divorced women's reliance on social security (with Christine Barczak), 1989

=== Conference Proceedings ===
- Family configurations: post-divorce insights from children, 1989

=== Articles ===
- "Financial support and relationships with children", 1989
- "A psychologist in family studies: research and social policy", 1994
- "Australia, a proposal for reform: Economic hardship and inequalities due to marriage breakdown", 1992
- "The Australian Family Law Reform Act and public attitudes to parental responsibility", 1998
- "Marriage, parenthood and the law", 1993
- "Changes in child support: Changes to the Child Support Scheme" announced by the Federal Government in 1997, 1997
