= Wifedom: Mrs Orwell's Invisible Life =

2023 book by Anna Funder

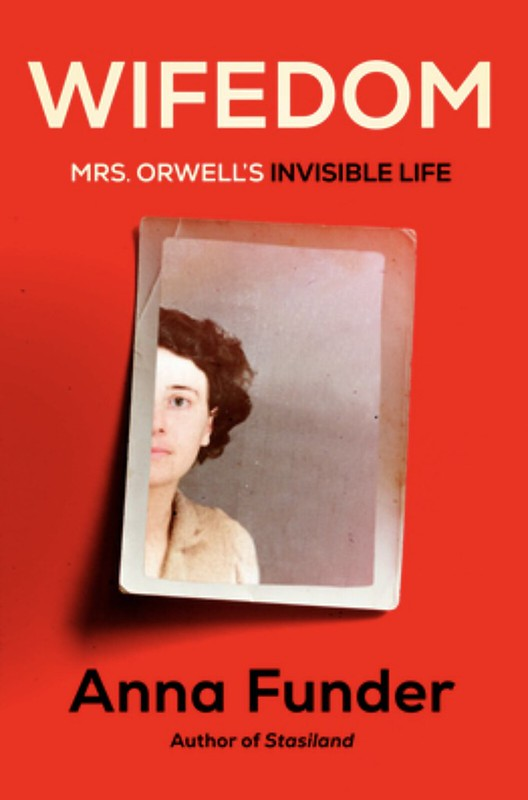
- First edition cover
- Author: Anna Funder
- Publisher: Penguin
- Publication date: 4 July 2023
- ISBN: 9780143787112

Wifedom: Mrs Orwell's Invisible Life is a book written by Australian author Anna Funder. It is a fictionalised biography of English author George Orwell's first wife, Eileen O'Shaughnessy, which shows her contribution to his work and casts Orwell in a bad light. The book was first published as a paperback and an eBook by Penguin Books on 4 July 2023.

== Background ==
In Wifedom: Mrs Orwell's Invisible Life, Funder uses letters discovered in 2005 from Orwell's first wife, Eileen O'Shaughnessy, to her best friend from college to recreate the Orwells' marriage. O'Shaughnessy was an Oxford-educated English graduate and writer who studied under Tolkien. She was also active in Spain during the Spanish Civil War, working in propaganda at the head office of the International Labour Party while Orwell was in the trenches. Eileen also worked to support the couple financially during their marriage, including during the war in London at the Department of Censorship, and she collaborated closely with Orwell on the writing of Animal Farm.

Wifedom is a hybrid work that blends memoir, biography, fiction, and interrogates the gender dynamics of Orwell's first marriage.

== Publication ==
Wifedom was published by Penguin Books on 4 July 2023 as a paperback and an eBook in the UK, the US, and Australia. It was subsequently released in other countries, including France, Italy, Denmark, and Korea.

== Reception ==
Wifedom was an instant Sunday Times Bestseller on release in August 2023. Hailed as "electrifying" by Kirkus Reviews (starred review) and "a spellbinding achievement" by The Financial Times, Wifedom was a New York Times Notable Book of 2023 and named a Book of the Year by The Guardian, The Independent, The Economist, LitHub, the The Daily Telegraph, The Financial Times, and The Times. It was BBC 4 Book of the Week.

Robert McCrum, in The Independent called it "One of the most startling explorations of life-writing (Eileen’s, Orwell's, and Funder's) in recent times . . . Wifedom is a genre-bending tour-de-force that resurrects an invisible woman, and relitigates the saintly image of the man she called 'Eric' . . . a moving, forensic act of biographical reconstruction."

Sarah Bakewell in ''The New York Times described it as "A virtuoso performance on the theme, adding personal memoir, some fictional reconstructions and a glittering sense of purpose."

Pulitzer Prize-winner Geraldine Brooks called it "Simply a masterpiece. Here, Anna Funder not only remakes the art of biography, she resurrects a woman in full. And this in a narrative that grips the reader and unfolds through some of the most consequential moments—historical and cultural—of the twentieth century."

However, there were some objections to Funder's depiction of Orwell and his relationships with women. In her book Funder portrays Orwell as misogynistic and sadistic. This sparked a strong controversy among Orwell's biographers, particularly with Sylvia Topp who wrote Eileen: The Making of George Orwell (2020). Celia Kirwan's family also intervened in the discussion, believing that the attribution to Celia of a relationship with Orwell, was false. Funder agreed to remove references to Celia being a lover of Orwell and visiting him on Jura, but maintains that there were accounts of "almost innumerable infidelities" during their marriage. Funder later said that she had published facts that had been deliberately hidden, including "his repressed homosexuality, his sadism, his paranoia, his infidelities, his complexity out of which the work comes", and The Orwell Society, which including the couple's adopted son Richard Blair and his friend Quentin Kopp, had objected to this.

== Awards ==
=== Wins ===
- Prix du Meilleur Livre Étranger 2024
- ABIA (Australian Book Industry Award) Biography Book of the Year Award, 2024
- BookPeople (Book Data) 2024 Non-Fiction Book of the Year

=== Nominations ===
- Prix Médicis (shortlisted)
- ELLE Grand Prix des Lectrices (shortlist)
- Prix du roman Fnac 2024
- Women's Prize for Fiction (longlisted)
- Gordon Burn Prize (shortlist)
- NIB Award (shortlisted)
- Indie Book Awards (longlisted)
