= Stasiland =

2002 book by Anna Funder

- First edition cover
- Author: Anna Funder
- Language: English
- Subject: East German culture, Stasi
- Genre: History
- Publisher: Granta
- Publication date: 5 June 2003
- Publication place: United Kingdom
- Pages: 304
- Dewey Decimal: 943.087
- LC Class: HV8210.5 .A2
- Website: granta.com/products/stasiland/

Stasiland by Anna Funder is a book published in 2003 about individuals who resisted the East German regime, and others who worked for its secret police, the Stasi. It tells the story of what it was like to work for the Stasi, and describes how those who did so now come to terms, or do not, with their pasts.

Funder, an Australian, found that Germans often resorted to stereotypes in describing the Ossis, the German nickname for those who lived in East Germany, dismissing questions about civil resistance. She used classified ads to reach former members of the Stasi and anti-Stasi organizations and interviewed them extensively.

== Publication ==
A German-language version was published by Europäische Verlagsanstalt in 2004. The association GBM (German: Gesellschaft zum Schutz von Bürgerrecht und Menschenwürde, lit. 'Society for the Protection of Civil Rights and Human Dignity') obtained an interim injunction in Germany against the publication. In 2006, S. Fischer Verlag republished the book in German without the offending passages.

== Reception ==
Chris Mitchell of Spike Magazine called it "an essential insight into the totalitarian regime". Giles MacDonogh wrote in The Guardian that the culture of informants and moral capitulations "comes wonderfully to life in Funder's racy account".

Stasiland has been published in 69 countries and translated into a dozen languages. It was shortlisted for many awards in the UK and Australia, among them The Age Book of the Year Awards, the Queensland Premier's Literary Awards, the Guardian First Book Award 2003, the South Australian Festival Awards for Literature (Innovation in Writing) 2004, the Index Freedom of Expression Awards 2004, and the W.H. Heinemann Award 2004. In June 2004 it was awarded the Samuel Johnson Prize.

Stasiland was developed for the stage by The National Theatre in London.

== Further reading and sources ==
- Byrnes, Sholto; Tonkin, Boyd (2004-06-18). "Anna Funder: Inside the real Room 101". The Independent. London.
- Funder, Anna (2003). Stasiland: Stories from behind the Berlin Wall. London: Granta. ISBN 978-1-86207-655-6. OCLC 55891480.
- Funder, Anna. Why Germany can’t get over the Wall, November 3, 2009.
- Funder, Anna (2019) Interviewed by Jason Steger at the Sydney Writers' Festival.
