= Georg Bernhard =

German journalist (1875–1944)

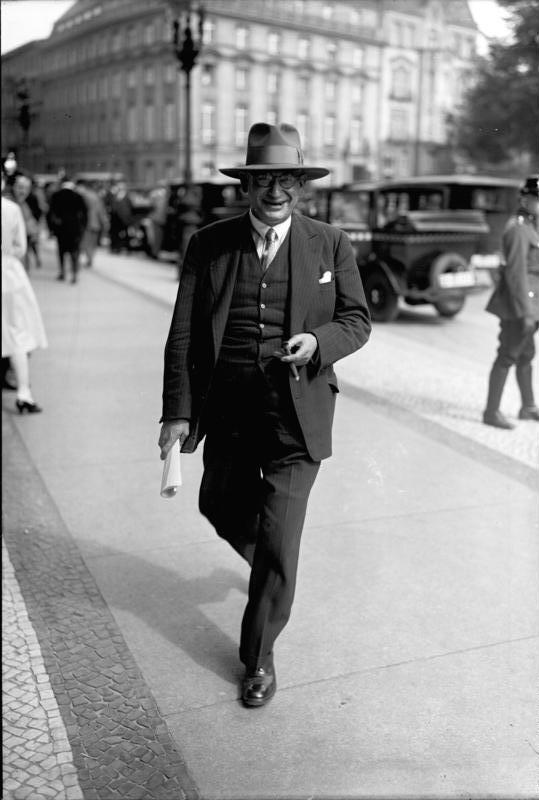
- Georg Bernhard (1928)
- Born: October 20, 1875
- Died: February 10, 1944 (aged 68)

Georg Bernhard (October 20, 1875 in Berlin – February 10, 1944 in New York) was a left-liberal German journalist of Jewish descent who became active against National Socialism early on. He had to emigrate in 1933 and was the founder of an important exile newspaper.

== Life ==
Bernhard's father, Hermann, worked as a merchant and his mother, Helene, was born Soberski. Georg Bernhard had completed an apprenticeship in banking and became a business journalist. In 1899 he married Fritze Mühsam and had a child in 1901 called Stefanie Ruth who later became an actress. In 1912 they had another daughter named Eva Marie. In 1939, while in exile in Paris, Bernhard married the painter Gertrud Landsberger.

From 1898 to 1903, Bernhard held a position as trade editor at the Berliner Zeitung, which belonged to Ullstein. At the same time, he studied law and political science. From 1904 to 1925, Bernhard published the business newspaper Plutus, of which he was the founder and owner. From 1908 he was employed in the publishing management at Ullstein. When Ullstein-Verlag bought the Vossische Zeitung in 1914, Bernhard was appointed second editor-in-chief until 1920, alongside the previously sole editor-in-chief, Hermann Bachmann. From 1916 he also gave lectures at the Berlin Commercial College. From 1920 to 1930, Bernhard was the sole editor-in-chief of the Vossische Zeitung. Bernhard shaped the newspaper into a left-liberal paper. He advocated the expansion of democracy and - despite the Treaty of Versailles - decidedly for an understanding with France. From 1928 to 1930 Bernhard was member of Reichstag for the German Democratic Party. He was involved in Jewish associations. His discussion style was very decisive and he didn't hold back his opinions. This also made Bernhard a preferred target of anti-Semitic agitation.
