= Hans Wesemann =

German journalist

Hans Wesemann (27 November 1895, Nienburg on the Weser – 23 October 1971, Caracas) was a German journalist and Gestapo agent.

== Early life ==
Wesemann was born into the family of Fritz Wesemann and his wife Margarethe Hars. He lived with them and his three siblings Sigrid, Greta and Freiedrich on a large farm. He served on the Eastern Front during World War I.

== Career ==
His breakthrough as a journalist came when he was able to interview Ernst Toller in 1923. Following his brief spell as President of the Bavarian Soviet Republic, Toller was still being held in Niederschönenfeld Prison and Wesemann had to overcome the suspicions of the warders to gain access to the political prisoner.

By 1935, Wesemann had become a Gestapo agent and conducted the first known kidnapping outside Germany by the Nazis. This was the kidnapping of German pacifist journalist Berthold Jacob in Basel, Switzerland, on 9 March 1935. Wesemann was subsequently arrested by the local police, and in September 1935 Jacob was returned to Switzerland following an intervention by the Swiss Federal Council. On 6 May 1936, Wesemann was found guilty of kidnapping by a Basel court. He was sentenced to three years in prison and fined 1,500 Swiss francs. Wesemann was released from prison in March 1938, after which he was deported from Switzerland. He later moved to Venezuela.
