= Mathilde Wurm =

German politician, social worker and journalist

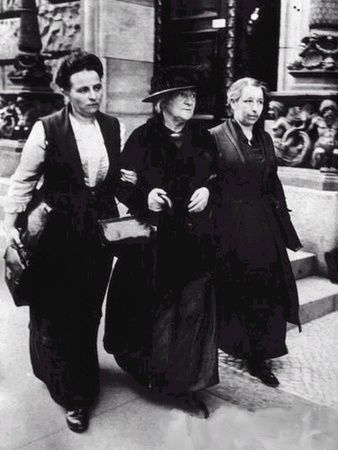
Mathilde Wurm (right) with Lore Agnes and Clara Zetkin, 1919

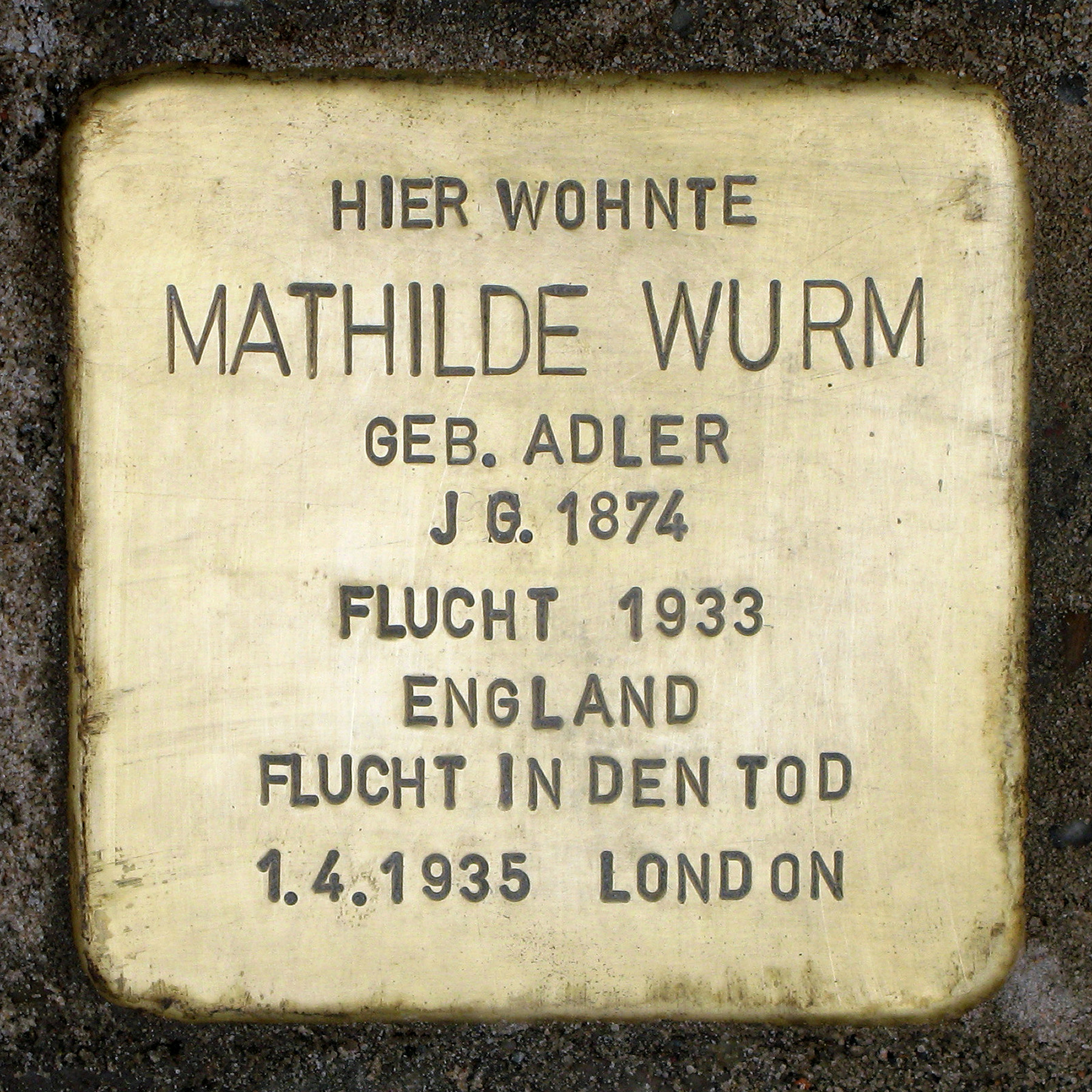
Stolperstein for Mathilde Wurm at Genthiner Straße 41, Berlin-Tiergarten

Mathilde Wurm (née Adler; 30 September 1874 – 31 March or 1 April 1935) was a German politician, social worker and journalist. She represented the Social Democratic Party of Germany and the Independent Social Democratic Party of Germany in the Reichstag from 1920 to 1933.

== Life and career ==
Wurm was born Mathilde Adler in 1874 to a Jewish family in Frankfurt am Main. She moved to Berlin and began working as a social worker in 1896. She was particularly interested in helping girls to receive vocational training, which led to her co-founding Berlin's first apprenticeship placement and counselling service for female school-leavers. In 1904 she married Emanuel Wurm, a journalist who later entered politics.

Wurm was involved in socialist circles from a young age, and was a longstanding member of the Social Democratic Party of Germany (SDP). After marriage, she mainly worked as a journalist and was active in the women's movement of the SPD, through which she regularly corresponded with Rosa Luxemburg, Clara Zetkin and Luise Kautsky. In 1919 she was elected to the Berliner Stadtverordnetenversammlung (Berlin City Council). When her husband Emanuel died in 1920, Mathilde assumed his seat in the Reichstag Ministry of Food under the Independent Social Democratic Party of Germany (USPD).

Wurm retained her seat in the Reichstag—alternately as a member of both the SPD and USPD—until the dissolution of the Weimar Republic in 1933. During 1922 and 1923 she edited the USPD magazine Die Kämpferin (The Female Fighter), later named Die Gleichheit (Equality), and although she was not religious, she remained active in the Berlin Jewish community until 1924.

== Exile ==
When Adolf Hitler came into power in 1933, Wurm initially remained in Germany to defend her constituents. However, her property was confiscated and she became homeless, often spending the night on a train. She left Germany for Switzerland in May 1933, where she stayed with her sister, Josephine Cohn, for eight months. She scraped a living as a typist before moving to London on 3 February 1934 to visit her nephew Arthur Campbell. In London, she lived with fellow political activist and émigré Dora Fabian firstly in a flat on Guilford Street.

== Death ==
Wurm and Fabian were found dead in their flat at 12, Great Ormond Street, Bloomsbury, London, on 4 April 1935 and were found to have died either on 31 March or on 1 April 1935. While suicide was suspected, the deaths were treated as suspicious.

The case was covered in the British press and presumed to have been a double suicide by barbitone poisoning. Due to the suspicious circumstances surrounding the two women's deaths and the lack of a motive, some observers suggested that they had been killed by Gestapo officers, but a coroner's inquest resulted in a verdict of "suicide while of unsound mind".
