= Anna Funder =

Australian author

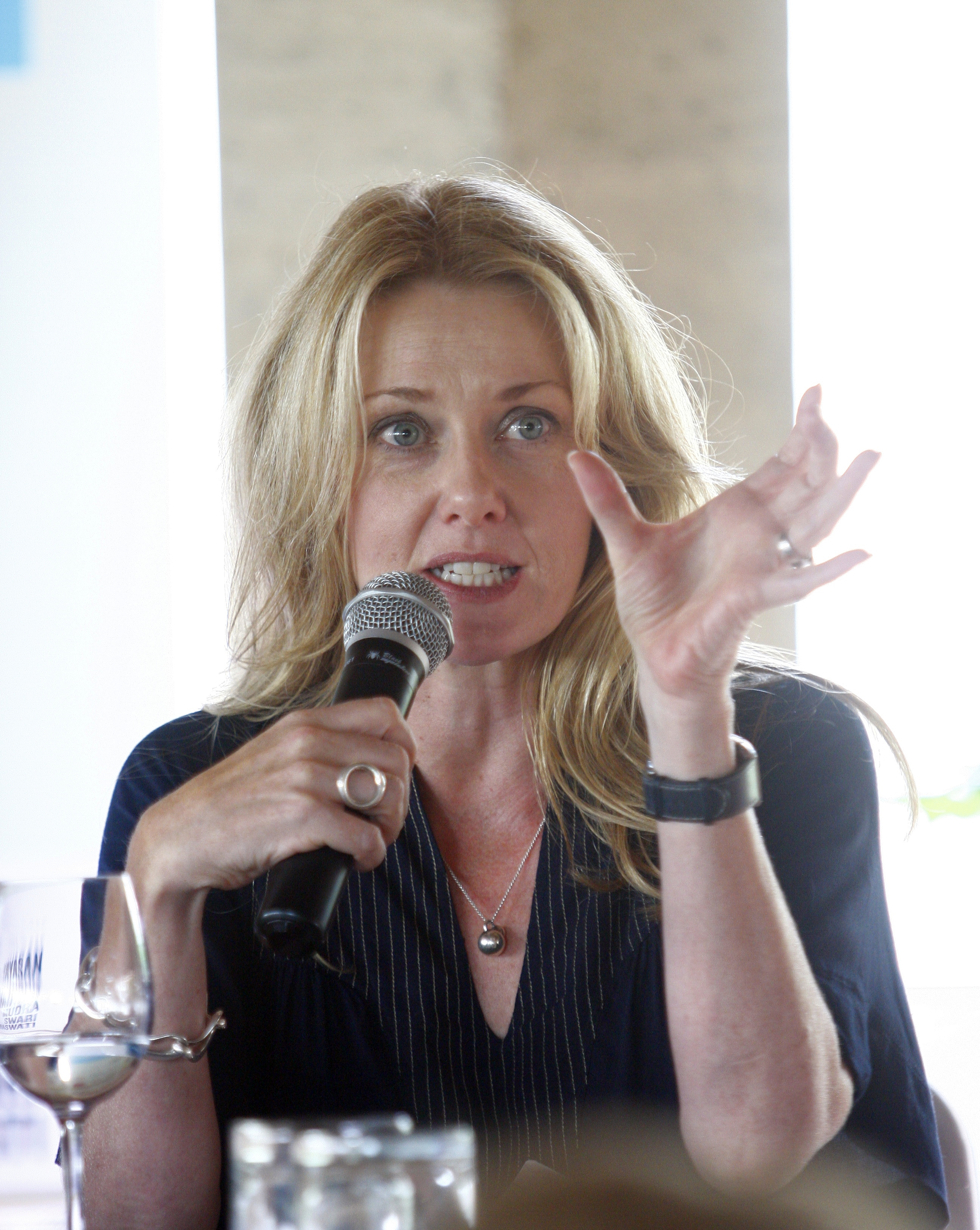
- Anna Funder, Ubud Writers & Readers Festival, 2012
- Born: 1966 (age 59–60); Melbourne, Australia
- Education: BA (Hons), LLB (Hons), MA (University of Melbourne); DAAD scholarship (Free University of Berlin); Doctor of Creative Arts (University of Technology Sydney)
- Occupation: Writer
- Partner: Craig Allchin
- Parent(s): Kate Funder, John Funder
- Writing career
- Years active: 2002—
- Notable works: Stasiland (2003), All That I Am (2011), Wifedom (2023)
- Notable awards: Miles Franklin Award 2012, Samuel Johnson Prize 2004
- Website: www.annafunder.com

Anna Funder (born 1966) is an Australian author. Funder's book Stasiland (2003) won the 2004 UK's Samuel Johnson Prize - now known as the Baillie Gifford Prize for Non-Fiction - for best piece of non-fiction published in the English language. Her 2012 novel All That I Am won many prizes including the Miles Franklin Literary Award. Her Wifedom: Mrs Orwell's Invisible Life (2023) was a Sunday Times Bestseller as soon as it was released in August 2023. It received France's Prix du Meilleur Livre Étranger in 2024. Hailed as "electrifying" by Kirkus Reviews (starred review) and "a spellbinding achievement" by the Financial Times, Wifedom was a New York Times Notable Book of 2023, and named a Book of the Year by The Guardian, the Independent, the Economist, LitHub, the Telegraph, the Daily Telegraph, the Financial Times, and the Times.

== Life ==
Anna Funder was born in Melbourne, Australia, in 1966. Funder's father is endocrinologist Professor John Funder, and her mother was the late psychologist Dr Kate Funder. Funder was educated in both Paris and Melbourne. She graduated Dux of Star of the Sea College in Brighton, Victoria 1983.

As an undergraduate of the University of Melbourne, where she studied English literature, German, and law, she was awarded a DAAD scholarship, enabling her to attend the Free University of Berlin in West Berlin in 1987, before the fall of the Berlin Wall. She left Berlin in 1988. Funder holds a BA (Hons) in English literature, German and law; an LLB (Hons); and an MA in creative writing from the University of Melbourne.

In 2006 she started researching and writing her novel, All That I Am, when she was undertaking the creative component of her work to earn a Doctor of Creative Arts from the University of Technology Sydney (UTS).

Funder speaks French and German fluently.

Funder has also been involved in advocacy on human rights, privacy, democratic safeguards and copyright protection in the age of AI. She has toured extensively talking about her writing as well as human rights issues, delivering many public orations. Funder was invited in 2026 by Thinkable to conduct a speaking tour across Australia, addressing sold out Town Hall venues in Melbourne and Sydney, and other cities.

In April 2026 she was appointed Professor of Practice in Creative Writing at the University of Sydney.

== Career ==
=== Legal career ===
Funder's undergraduate dissertation, supervised by Professor Hilary Charlesworth, 'De minimis non curat lex: The Clitoris, Culture and the Law' concerned female genital mutilation as a human rights abuse. It was published in an American scholarly journal, and has been cited many times, including in submissions to the Australian Parliament.

Funder was admitted to practise as a barrister and solicitor of the Supreme Court of Victoria. In the 1990s Funder worked as Counsel in International and Human Rights law for the Australian Government. She worked on Section 52 of the Constitution, human rights, and constitutional law; and with the Department of Foreign Affairs and Trade on international treaty negotiations. Other activities included a focus on the rights of the child and environmental protections.

Funder ended her career in law when she moved from Australia to live in Berlin and write full-time in the late 1990s. She has said that she had always wanted to be a writer, but her training in law had equipped her well for situations in which she later found herself, including interviewing ex-Stasi men.

=== Journalism ===
Funder's essays, feature articles and columns have appeared in The Guardian, The Observer, The Sunday Times, The Sydney Morning Herald, The Paris Review, Best Australian Essays, Die Zeit, and The Monthly.

Funder wrote a column for the Norwegian publication Ny Tid, alternating with Russian journalist Anna Politkovskaya up until Politkovskaya's assassination in 2006. Funder's feature essay "Secret History" on the Nazi files held in the Arolsen Archives (Bad Arolsen), published in the Good Weekend and The Guardian was awarded the ASA Maunder Award for Journalism in 2007.

=== Family ===
Funder is married and has three children.

== Writing ==
Funder "explores the space between the conscience and the soul" (Scotland on Sunday). Donna Rifkind, in the Wall Street Journal notes that "Funder shows that radical compassion - which is not the same as forgiveness - will move one closer to understanding, in marriage and biography, every time". Funder has said that "the central aesthetic and political preoccupation of my life is the question of how a human being can recognise and resist illegitimate power".

=== Stasiland ===
Funder's 2003 Stasiland tells true stories of people who resisted the communist dictatorship of East Germany, and of people who worked for its secret police, the Stasi. In 2020 Maurice Frank, of the Berliner Zeitung wrote "Anna Funder's Stasiland has become a classic of the literature on Communist East Germany. Thirty years after reunification, the book could serve as a warning for now". In the New York Times, William Gibson, called it "superb"; Tom Hanks called it "fascinating, entertaining, hilarious, horrifying and very important"; the London Review of Books called it ‘meticulous and compassionate. . . a heroic act of listening.’

Stasiland has been translated into 25 languages and honoured with publication by the Folio Society. It won the 2004 Samuel Johnson Prize (now Baillie Gifford Prize) for best non-fiction published in the English language, and was also the finalist for the Age Book of the Year Awards, Guardian First Book Award, Queensland Premier's Literary Award, Adelaide Festival Awards for Literature (Innovation in Writing), Index Freedom of Expression Awards, and the W.H. Heinemann Award.

=== All That I Am ===
Funder's 2012 novel All That I Am tells the previously untold story of four German-Jewish anti-Hitler activists forced to flee Berlin for London, where they continued the dangerous and illegal work of smuggling documents out of Goering's office, and giving them to Winston Churchill (a backbencher at the time) to try to alert the world to Hitler's plans for war. Two of the activists were found dead in 1935. Against the backdrop of the British policy of appeasement, the inquest into their deaths was a whitewash.

The book was very well received by critics, including the Times Literary Supplement), which called it "strong and impressively humane", and The Wall Street Journal, which called it "imaginative, compassionate, and convincing". It won Australia's most prestigious fiction prize, the Miles Franklin Literary Award. The Spectator hailed it as "superb". Weekendavisen called the novel "a beautiful ensemble novel of Graham Green'esque proportions".

Published in 25 countries, the novel was BBC Book of the Week and Book at Bedtime in the UK, and The Times (London) Book of the Month for May 2012.

==== Awards Received ====
- Miles Franklin Award, 2012
- Western Australian Premier's Book Awards - 2011 Fiction Award
- Western Australian Premier's Book Awards - 2011 People's Choice Award
- Barbara Jefferis Award
- The Indie Book Awards Best Debut Fiction
- Australian Book Industry Award (ABIA) Literary Fiction Book of the Year 2012
- Nielson BookData Bookseller's Choice Award

==== Awards Nominated ====
- International IMPAC Dublin Literary Award
- Asher Literary Award
- Commonwealth Book Prize
- Prime Minister's Literary Award
- ALS Gold Medal
- Adelaide Festival Awards for Literature - Fiction Prize
- Victorian Premier's Literary Award
- Queensland Literary Awards

==== The Girl with the Dogs ====
In July 2015 Funder published a novella titled The Girl with the Dogs.

=== Wifedom: Mrs Orwell's Invisible Life ===
Wifedom: Mrs Orwell's Invisible Life was published on 4 July 2023 in the United Kingdom, the United States of America, and Australia, and subsequently in many other countries. Wifedom is a creative biography of George Orwell's first wife, Eileen O'Shaughnessy, which includes scenes based on Eileen's letters to her best friend throughout her marriage, and a forensic examination of how patriarchy works to eliminate important women from history, and the unpaid work of women today.

Funder shows how Orwell and his biographers minimised or eliminated Eileen's contributions to her husband's work and life, as well as that of other women, including his mother and aunt. Funder says that one of her aims was "to see how men can imagine themselves as innocent in a system that benefits them, at others' cost". Eileen, an Oxford graduate, supported the couple throughout the marriage, including from her work at the Censorship Department in the Ministry of Information and the Ministry of Food. Eileen also worked closely with George Orwell on the writing of Animal Farm.

Wifedom was an instant Sunday Times Bestseller on release in August 2023 and it was awarded France's Prix du Meilleur Livre Étranger 2024. It also received the ABIA (Australian Book Industry Award) Biography Book of the Year Award for 2024, and the BookPeople (Book Data) 2024 Non-Fiction Book of the Year. Kirkus Reviews hailed it as "electrifying" and "a spellbinding achievement". It was named a New York Times Notable Book of 2023 and named a Book of the Year by The Guardian, The Independent, The Economist, LitHub, the The Daily Telegraph, The Financial Times, and The Times. Wifedom was also featured on the Book of the Week series for BBC 4.

Robert McCrum called Wifedom "[o]ne of the most startling explorations of life-writing (Eileen's, Orwell's and Funder's) in recent times ... Wifedom is a genre-bending tour-de-force that resurrects an invisible woman, and relitigates the saintly image of the man she called "Eric" ... a moving, forensic act of biographical reconstruction". Sarah Bakewell in a New York Times review described it as "[a] virtuoso performance on the theme, adding personal memoir, some fictional reconstructions and a glittering sense of purpose". Geraldine Brooks, the winner of the Pulitzer Prize, labelled it as "a masterpiece", saying that "Anna Funder not only re-makes the art of biography, she resurrects a woman in full. And this in a narrative that grips the reader and unfolds through some of the most consequential moments - historical and cultural - of the twentieth century".

There was, however, a negative reaction from some members of The Orwell Society, a registered charity and fanclub, who accused Funder of attacking Orwell. Funder said that she had published facts that had been deliberately hidden, including "his repressed homosexuality, his sadism, his paranoia, his infidelities, his complexity out of which the work comes." Funder comments that The Orwell Society members would prefer to "think about Orwell as he wanted to think of himself: as a decent, upstanding, heterosexual man". She also noted that someone "who was so vanilla could never have had the vision, say, for Nineteen Eighty-Four, which is paranoid and sadistic and wonderful for us".

==== Awards ====
- 2024: Prix du Meilleur Livre Étranger
- 2024: ABIA (Australian Book Industry Award) Biography Book of the Year.
- 2024: BookPeople (Book Data) 2024 Non-Fiction Book of the Year.

===== Nominated =====
- 2024: Prix Femina (shortlisted)
- 2024: Prix Médicis (shortlisted)
- 2024: ELLE Grand Prix des Lectrices (shortlisted)
- 2024: FNAC Prix du Roman
- 2024: Women's Prize (longlisted)
- 2024: Gordon Burn Prize (shortlisted)
- 2024: NIB Award (shortlisted)
- 2024: Indie Book Awards (shortlisted)

=== Academia ===
In 2022, Funder was a part-time staff member in the Faculty of Arts and Social Sciences at UTS. With emeritus professor Roy Green, she founded the Vice-Chancellor's Democracy Forum, an international speaker series which invited leading global thinkers to discuss challenges to democracy today. Guests included Nobel Prize-winning economist Joseph Stiglitz, SIGNAL founder Meredith Whittaker, former Yale Professor and fascism expert Jason Stanley, Irish journalist Fintan O'Toole, British philosopher Lea Ypi and literary historian Sarah Churchwell.

In April 2026, Funder was appointed Professor of Practice in Creative Writing in the School of Art, Communication and English at the University of Sydney.

== Other activities ==
=== Human rights advocacy ===
Funder has worked with a number of human rights organisations. She has been an ambassador for the Norwegian-based International Cities of Refuge Network (ICORN), a global network of cities offering safe havens for persecuted writers.

Funder is a member of the Advisory Panel of the Australian Privacy Foundation.

=== AI and copyright ===
Funder has been outspoken about AI's illegal theft of copyright material, especially writers' works, including her own. In 2025, together with Julia Powles, Funder published on AI's global illegal use of copyright material. In September 2025 Funder appeared with Tom Keneally and Sally Rippin before a Australian Senate Committee hearing on AI companies' "training" of AI computer programs involving the theft of copyright material.

In an interview in July 2026 with Nicola Heath, Funder stated that she believes a "massive crime" to have occurred in the act of various tech firms using the books of the world as the raw data for their AI models without the consent of those books' authors.

Funder's piece 'I don't want a US tech bro as a patron - which is why artists must defend our copyright in the age of AI' appeared in the Guardian on 6 July. On 21 October Funder addressed the Joint Select Committee on AI of the Australian Parliament.

=== Memberships and boards ===
As of 2020 Funder was a board member of the University of Melbourne Foundation, and she is a Luminary of UTS.

Funder has been a member of the Folio Prize Academy and PEN International, both its Australian and US chapters.

In 2007 she delivered a lecture as part of Sydney PEN Voices: The 3 Writers Project. In it, she explored ways of thinking about extraordinary human courage such as that of Anna Politkovskaya, the Putin critic and journalist assassinated in 2006. The book Courage, Survival, Greed was published in May 2009 as part of the project, containing essays by her along with Melissa Lucashenko and Christopher Kremmer, focused on "explor[ing] issues facing contemporary Australia".

=== Public appearances and lectures ===
Funder has spoken at festivalsaround the world, including literary festivals at Hay-on-Wye, Jaipur, and Cheltenham, Edinburgh, Kolkata, Mumbai, Nancy (France), Paris, Auckland, Sydney, Melbourne, Perth, Bali among others. She was selected by the Jewish Book Council to tour the United States of America with All That I Am, and has toured her books in many other countries around the world. Funder is a frequent contributor to radio, TV, and podcasts. In 2025 she hosted Is it Fascism Yet? with Masha Gessen and Jason Stanley at the Sydney Opera House.

Funder has delivered commencement addresses at universities and given named lectures throughout Australia and internationally, including:

- Allen Missen Address for Liberty Victoria
- Norwich Worlds Literary Festival, University of East Anglia (event with JM Coetzee and Tim Parks)
- Address to Graduands, Australian National University
- PEN Three Writers Lecture
- Dymphna Clark Memorial Lecture 2013
- ICORN Oration, Paris, 2013 (with Masha Gessen and John Ralston Saul)
- Kapittel 13, Literary Festival Norway, Keynote
- Le Conversazioni, Capri with Don De Lillo and Rachel Kushner
- Onassis Foundation Democracy Lecture, Athens
- Judith Wright Oration, University of New England
- Hunter College, City University of New York, keynote
- Keynote, International Association of Privacy Professionals Conference, London 2024
- The Closing Address, Perth Writers Festival
- Opening Address, with Dr Joy Buolamwini, International Association of Privacy Professionals Conference, Washington DC 2024
- Closing address "Bears out there", Sydney Writers Festival, May 2025
- The UTS International Women's Day Address 2024
- Keynote, JM Coetzee Centre for Creative Practice Symposium on Polycrisis, October 2026

== Awards and recognition ==
Aside from many awards nominated or won for her three books, Funder has been the recipient of other awards and recognition, including:

- Australia Council fellowship
- Rockefeller Foundation fellowship
- NSW Writing fellow
- University of Melbourne Felix Meyer Creative Writing Award
- 1987: German Academic Exchange Service (DAAD) fellowship
- 2004: Samuel Johnson Prize
- 2007: Australian Society of Authors (ASA) Maunder Award for Journalism, for her feature on Nazi death camp files held by the German Government
- 2008: Rockfeller Foundation Fellowship
- 2010: Australia Council Fellowship
- 2010: NSW Writing Fellow
- 2011: Appointed to the Literature Board of the Australia Council
- 2012: The Times (London) Book of the Month for May 2012.
- 2013: InStyle magazine's Woman of Style Award for Arts & Culture
- 2025: Harper's Bazaar Australia Woman of Influence
- 2025: Fellow, Royal Society of NSW
- 2025: DAAD Arts and Media Fellow, Berlin
- 2026: Australia Council Grant

== Personal life ==
Funder lived with her husband and three children in Brooklyn, New York for three and a half years, before returning to Australia in 2015.

== Bibliography ==
- Stasiland: Stories from behind the Berlin Wall. London: Granta. 2003. ISBN 978-1-86207-655-6. OCLC 55891480.
- All That I Am. London: Penguin. 2011. ISBN 978-1-926428-33-8.
- The Girl with the Dogs. Australia: Penguin. 2015. ISBN 978-0-14357-350-0.
- Wifedom: Mrs Orwell's Invisible Life. Hamish Hamilton. 2023. ISBN 9780143787112.
