= Victorian Premier's Prize for Nonfiction =

Literary award

The Victorian Premier's Prize for Nonfiction, formerly known as the Nettie Palmer Prize for Non-Fiction, is a prize category in the annual Victorian Premier's Literary Award. As of 2011 it has a remuneration of A$25,000. The winner of this category prize vies with 4 other category winners for overall Victorian Prize for Literature valued at an additional A$100,000.

The prize was formerly known as the Nettie Palmer Prize for Non-Fiction from inception until 2010 when the awards were re-established under the stewardship of the Wheeler Centre and restarted with new prize amounts and a new name. The Nettie Palmer Prize was valued at A$30,000 in 2010. According to the State Library of Victoria which managed the prize from 1997 to 2010, "This prize is offered for a published work of non-fiction. Books consisting principally of photographs or illustrations are ineligible unless the accompanying text is of substantial length." Palmer wrote regularly for numerous newspapers all round Australia. She wrote on a wide range of topics, from environment to cultural events, reviewing all important books being published in Australia, America, Europe and elsewhere.

== Victorian Premier's Prize for Nonfiction ==
Winners of the Overall Victorian Prize for Literature have a blue ribbon.

Victorian Premier's Prize for Nonfiction winners and finalists
| Year | Author | Title | Result | Ref. |
|---|---|---|---|---|
| 2011 | Mark McKenna | An Eye for Eternity: The Life Of Manning Clark | Winner | |
| 2011 | Tim Bonyhady | Good Living Street | Finalist | |
| 2011 | Fiona Capp | My Blood’s Country | Finalist | |
| 2011 | Cordelia Fine | Delusions of Gender | Finalist | |
| 2011 | Stephen Foster | A Private Empire | Finalist | |
| 2011 | Anna Krien | Into the Woods | Finalist | |
| 2012 | Bill Gammage | The Biggest Estate on Earth | Winner | |
| 2012 | James Boyce | 1835: The Founding of Melbourne & The Conquest of Australia | Finalist | |
| 2012 | Kerryn Goldsworthy | Adelaide | Finalist | |
| 2012 | Simon Leys | The Hall of Uselessness | Finalist | |
| 2012 | Brenda Niall | True North: The Story of Mary and Elizabeth Durack | Finalist | |
| 2012 | Alice Pung | Her Father's Daughter | Finalist | |
| 2014 (Note: Prior to 2014, the award year was directly related to the year of publication. In 2014, the award year referred to books published in the previous year. That is, in 2012, the award went to books published in 2012. In 2014, the award went to books published in 2013.) | Henry Reynolds | Forgotten War | Winner | |
| 2014 | Germaine Greer | White Beech | Finalist | |
| 2014 | Gideon Haigh | On Warne | Finalist | |
| 2014 | Robert Kenny | Gardens of Fire: An Investigative Memoir | Finalist | |
| 2014 | Kristina Olsson | Boy, Lost: A Family Memoir | Finalist | |
| 2014 | Helen Trinca | Madeleine: A Life of Madeleine St John | Finalist | |
| 2014 | NPY Women's Council | Commended: Traditional Healers of Central Australia: Ngangkari | Finalist | |
| 2015 | Alan Atkinson | The Europeans in Australia: Volume Three: Nation | Winner | |
| 2015 | Erik Jensen | Acute Misfortune: The Life and Death of Adam Cullen (Note: Acute Misfortune was later the basis of the film Acute Misfortune) | Finalist | |
| 2015 | Tess Lea | Darwin | Finalist | |
| 2015 | Tim Low | Where Song Began | Finalist | |
| 2015 | Julie Szego | The Tainted Trial of Farah Jama | Finalist | |
| 2015 | Don Watson | The Bush | Finalist | |
| 2016 | Gerald Murnane | Something for the Pain | Winner | |
| 2016 | Lesley Harding and Kendrah Morgan | Modern Love: The Lives of John and Sunday Reed | Finalist | |
| 2016 | Karen Lamb | Thea Astley: Inventing Her Own Weather | Finalist | |
| 2016 | George Megalogenis | Australia’s Second Chance | Finalist | |
| 2016 | Drusilla Modjeska | Second Half First | Finalist | |
| 2016 | Brenda Niall | Mannix | Finalist | |
| 2017 | Madeline Gleeson | Offshore: Behind the wire on Manus and Nauru | Winner | |
| 2017 | Deng Adut with Ben Mckelvey | Songs of a War Boy | Finalist | |
| 2017 | Maxine Beneba Clarke | The Hate Race | Finalist | |
| 2017 | Sarah Ferguson with Patricia Drum | The Killing Season Uncut | Finalist | |
| 2017 | Kim Mahood | Position Doubtful | Finalist | |
| 2017 | Arnold Zable | The Fighter | Finalist | |
| 2018 | Sarah Krasnostein | The Trauma Cleaner: One Woman's Extraordinary Life in Death, Decay & Disaster | Winner | |
| 2018 | Georgia Blain | The Museum of Words: A Memoir of Language, Writing and Mortality | Finalist | |
| 2018 | Kate Cole-Adams | Anaesthesia: The Gift of Oblivion and the Mystery of Consciousness | Finalist | |
| 2018 | Mary-Rose MacColl | For a Girl: A True Story of Secrets, Motherhood and Hope | Finalist | |
| 2018 | Alexis Wright | Tracker | Finalist | |
| 2019 | Behrouz Boochani | No Friend But the Mountains: Writing from Manus Prison | Winner | |
| 2019 | Jessie Cole | Staying: A Memoir | Finalist | |
| 2019 | Chloe Hooper | The Arsonist: A Mind on Fire | Finalist | |
| 2019 | Bri Lee | Eggshell Skull | Finalist | |
| 2019 | Sofija Stefanovic | Miss Ex-Yugoslavia | Finalist | |
| 2019 | Maria Tumarkin | Axiomatic | Finalist | |
| 2020 | Christina Thompson | Sea People: The Puzzle of Polynesia | Winner | |
| 2020 | Chloe Higgins | The Girls | Finalist | |
| 2020 | Jess Hill | See What You Made Me Do: Power, Control and Domestic Abuse | Finalist | |
| 2020 | Lizzie O'Shea | Future Histories: What Ada Lovelace, Tom Paine, and the Paris Commune Can Teach Us About Digital Technology | Finalist | |
| 2020 | Archie Roach | Tell Me Why: The Story of My Life and My Music | Finalist | |
| 2020 | Gay’wu Group of Women | Songspirals: Sharing Women's Wisdom of Country Through Songlines | Finalist | |
| 2021 | Paddy Manning | Body Count: How Climate Change is Killing Us | Winner | |
| 2021 | Kylie Maslen | Show Me Where It Hurts | Finalist | |
| 2021 | Louise Milligan | Witness | Finalist | |
| 2021 | Margo Neale and Lynne Kelly | Songlines: The Power and Promise | Finalist | |
| 2021 | Ellena Savage | Blueberries | Finalist | |
| 2021 | Victor Steffensen | Fire Country: How Indigenous Fire Management Could Help Save Australia | Finalist | |
| 2022 | Amani Haydar | The Mother Wound | Winner | |
| 2022 | Randa Abdel-Fattah | Coming of Age in the War on Terror | Finalist | |
| 2022 | Danielle Celermajer | Summertime: Reflections on a Vanishing Future | Finalist | |
| 2022 | Veronica Gorrie | Black and Blue: A Memoir of Racism and Resilience | Finalist | |
| 2022 | Fiona Kelly McGregor | Buried Not Dead | Finalist | |
| 2022 | Chelsea Watego | Another Day in the Colony | Finalist | |
| 2023 | Eda Gunaydin | Root & Branch: Essays on Inheritance | Winner | |
| 2023 | Shannon Burns | Childhood | Finalist | |
| 2023 | Louisa Lim | Indelible City: Dispossession and Defiance in Hong Kong | Finalist | |
| 2023 | Kylie Moore-Gilbert | The Uncaged Sky: My 804 Days in an Iranian Prison | Finalist | |
| 2023 | Sally Olds | People Who Lunch: Essays on Work, Leisure and Loose Living | Finalist | |
| 2023 | Sam Wallman | Our Members Be Unlimited: A Comic about Workers and Their Unions | Finalist | |
| 2024 | Ellen van Neerven | Personal Score: Sport, culture, identity | Winner | |
| 2024 | Kris Kneen | Fat Girl Dancing | Finalist | |
| 2024 | Antony Loewenstein | The Palestine Laboratory: How Israel exports the technology of occupation around the world | Finalist | |
| 2024 | Chris Masters | Flawed Hero: Truth, lies and war crimes | Finalist | |
| 2024 | David Marr | Killing for Country: A family story | Finalist | |
| 2024 | Jordana Silverstein | Cruel Care: A history of children at our borders | Finalist | |
| 2025 | Susan Hampton | Anything Can Happen | Winner | |
| 2025 | Lucia Osborne-Crowley | The Lasting Harm: Witnessing the Trial of Ghislaine Maxwell | Finalist | |
| 2025 | Bonny Cassidy | ~~Monument~~ | Finalist | |
| 2025 | Clare Wright | Näku Dhäruk The Bark Petitions: How the People of Yirrkala Changed the Course of Australian Democracy | Finalist | |
| 2025 | Cassandra Pybus | A Very Secret Trade | Finalist | |
| 2026 | Micaela Sahhar | Find Me at the Jaffa Gate: An encyclopaedia of a Palestinian family | Winner | |
| 2026 | Debra Dank | Ankami | Finalist | |
| 2026 | J. M. Field | The Eagle and the Crow | Finalist | |
| 2026 | Henry Reynolds | Looking from the North: Australian history from the top down | Finalist | |
| 2026 | Cam Wilson and Ariel Bogle | Conspiracy Nation | Finalist | |

== Nettie Palmer Prize for Nonfiction ==
Nettie Palmer Prize for Nonfiction winners
| Year | Author | Title | Result | Ref. |
|---|---|---|---|---|
| 1985 | Bernard Smith | The Boy Adeodatus : The Portrait of a Lucky Young Bastard | Winner | |
| 1986 | John Bryson | Evil Angels | Winner | |
| 1987 | Hugh Stretton | Political Essays | Winner | |
| 1988 | Brian Matthews | Louisa | Winner | |
| 1989 | Oskar Spate | Paradise Found and Lost | Winner | |
| 1990 | Roland Griffiths-Marsh | The Sixpenny Soldier | Winner | |
| 1991 | Dorothy Hewett | Wild Card | Winner | |
| 1992 | David Marr | Patrick White: A Life | Winner | |
| 1993 | Greg Dening | Mr Bligh's Bad Language | Winner | |
| 1994 | Jim Davidson | Lyrebird Rising: Louise Hanson-Dyer of Oiseau-Lyre 1884-1962 | Winner | |
| 1995 | Brenda Niall | Georgiana: A Biography of Georgiana McCrae, Painter, Diarist, Pioneer | Winner | |
| 1996 | Tom Griffiths | Hunters and Collectors: The Antiquarian Imagination in Australia | Winner | |
| 1997 | Peter Robb | Midnight in Sicily | Winner | |
| 1998 | Raimond Gaita | Romulus, My Father | Winner | |
| 1999 | Peter Robb | M: The Man Who Became Caravaggio | Winner | |
| 2000 | Adrian Caesar | The White | Winner | |
| 2001 | Anna Haebich | Broken Circles: Fragmenting Indigenous Families 1800-2000 | Winner | |
| 2002 | Brenda Niall | The Boyds: A Family Biography | Winner | |
| 2003 | Barry Hill | Broken Song: T.G.H. Strehlow and Aboriginal Possession | Winner | |
| 2004 | Graeme Davison | Car Wars: How the Car Won Our Hearts and Conquered Our Cities | Winner | |
| 2005 | Robert Dessaix | Twilight of Love: Travels with Turgenev | Winner | |
| 2006 | Helen Ennis | Margaret Michaelis: Love, Loss and Photography | Winner | |
| 2006 | Richard Broome | Aboriginal Victorians: A History Since 1800 | Finalist | |
| 2006 | Anthony M. Gibbs | Bernard Shaw: A Life | Finalist | |
| 2006 | Jacob G. Rosenberg | East of Time | Finalist | |
| 2006 | Craig Sherborne | Hoi Polloi | Finalist | |
| 2007 | Danielle Clode | Voyages to the South Seas: In Search of Terres Australes | Winner | |
| 2008 | Meredith Hooper | The Ferocious Summer: Palmer's Penguins and the Warming of Antarctica | Winner | |
| 2009 | Chloe Hooper | The Tall Man: Death and Life on Palm Island | Winner | |
| 2010 | Brenda Walker | Reading by Moonlight: How Books Saved a Life | Winner | |
