= Roosevelt High School (Seattle) =

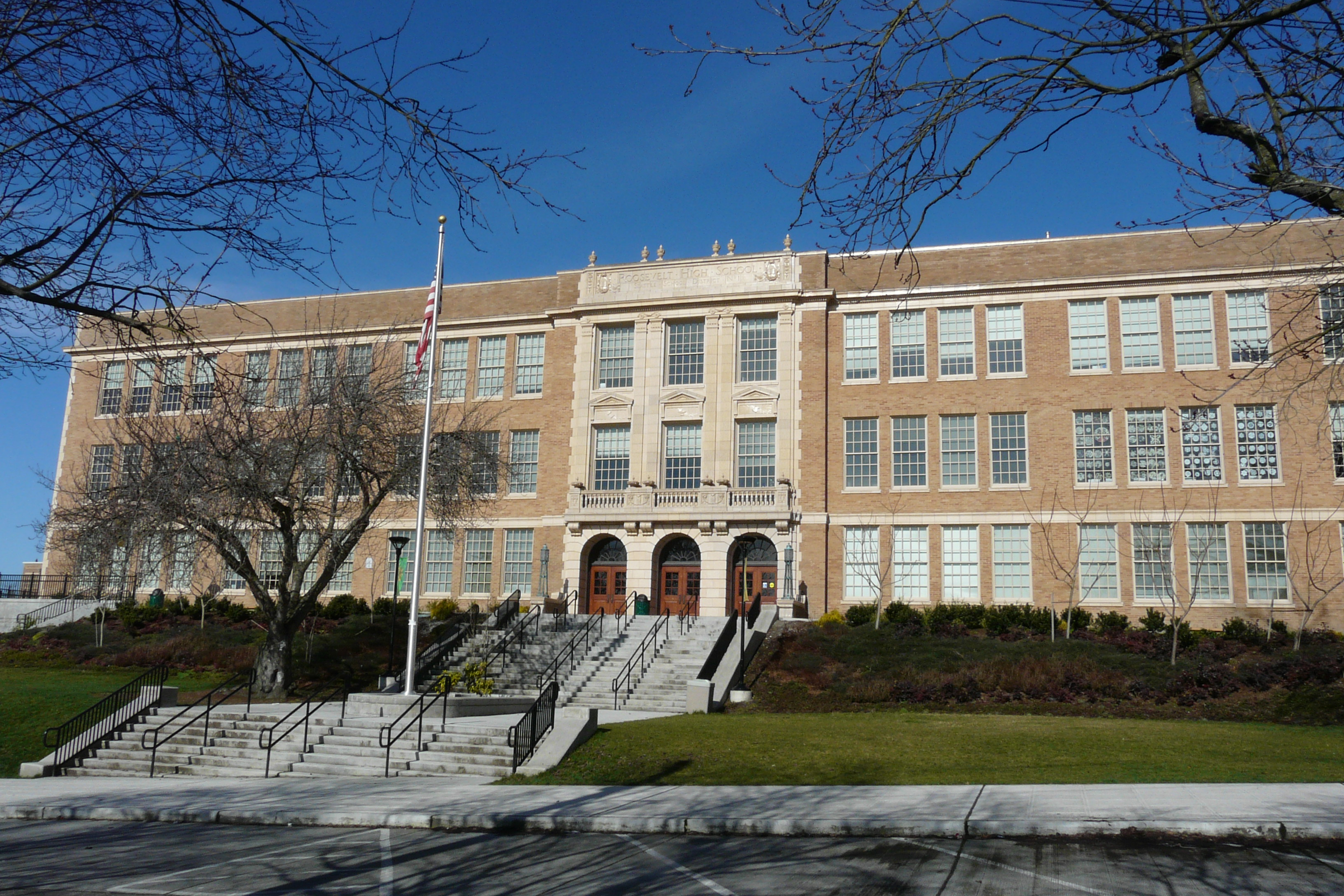
- South entrance in February 2008

Location
- 1410 NE 66th Street; Seattle, Washington 98115; United States; 47.677°N 122.313°W

Information
- Type: Public
- Motto: "What I am to be I am now becoming"
- Established: 1922
- Principal: Ambyr Burrell
- Teaching staff: 69.30 (FTE)
- Grades: 9–12
- Enrollment: 1,528 (2023-2024)
- Student to teacher ratio: 22.05
- Colors: Green & gold
- Athletics: WIAA Class 3A, Washington Interscholastic Activities Association
- Athletics conference: Metro 3A Sound Division
- Mascot: Rough Riders
- Rivals: Ballard, Garfield
- Newspaper: The Roosevelt News
- Yearbook: Strenuous Life
- Website: roosevelths.seattleschools.org

Roosevelt High School (RHS) is a public secondary school located in the Roosevelt neighborhood of Seattle, Washington, United States. Opened in 1922 to relieve overcrowding at Lincoln High School, it ranks as the second-largest high school in Seattle Public Schools. NPR described RHS as "an above-average school in a below-average school district" based on test scores in 2001.

== History ==
The school is named after President Theodore Roosevelt (1858–1919); the school's team, the Rough Riders, is named after Roosevelt's famous military regiment. It subsequently gave its name to the Roosevelt neighborhood and nearby Roosevelt Way Northeast.

The school was designed by the Seattle School District's architect, Floyd Naramore, and constructed in 1921–22. From 2004 to 2006, the building was seismically retrofitted, modernized, and expanded while many of the school's original architectural elements were preserved. During this time classes were held in Lincoln High School. Architects for this work were Bassetti Architects.

== Programs, groups, and clubs ==
In the Hands for a Bridge program, students choose to travel either to South Africa or Northern Ireland, where they help foster dialogue about diversity, prejudice, and social change. This group was created in 2001 by teachers Tom Nolet, Francene Watson, and Danny Rock with assistance from the University of Washington's Comparative History of Ideas Program and the Jackson School of International Studies. Each student accepted to this program is enrolled in the HFB class, where an intensive year-long study of literature, history, and the arts focuses on cultures in conflict. The Northern Ireland travelers visit Oakgrove Integrated College in Derry which is led by John Harkin, while the South African travelers visit Isilimela Comprehensive School and Bellville High School (Hoërskool Bellville) near Cape Town.

Roosevelt also is home to FIRST Robotics Competition (FRC) Washington team 4180, the Iron Riders. The student-run club constructs robots to compete in yearly competitions. The team attended the 2016 FIRST Championship in St. Louis and won a District Innovation in Control Award for their image recognition and targeting system. The Iron Riders were also on the winning alliance at the 8th Annual Washington Girls Generation FIRST Robotics Competition in 2019.

== Music ==
=== Marching band ===
The marching band performs halftime shows at some home football games and basketball games. Known as "The Pride of Seattle," this group of students also travels to and performs in multiple parades in the Northwest region each year.

=== Orchestras ===
The Roosevelt Orchestra program includes the Concert Orchestra, the Chamber Orchestra, and the Symphony Orchestra. The orchestras perform annually at various concerts and competitions, including the annual Northwest Orchestra Festival in Gresham, Oregon. In the 2013 festival, three groups out of the five (including a quintet and a sinfonia group) took first place in their divisions. The Roosevelt Symphony Orchestra also performs yearly with the Seattle Symphony in the annual Side by Side concert.

=== Jazz band ===
In 1960, Waldo King was the first educator in the Seattle Public Schools at Garfield High School to introduce a jazz band into the curriculum. After Garfield High School, he was the band director at Franklin High and Roosevelt High School from 1969 to 1983. Under King's direction, the Roosevelt Jazz Ensembles won the highest accolades at the prestigious Mt Hood Jazz Festivals, the Clarke College Jazz Festivals, and the Reno Jazz Festivals. After King retired in 1983, educator Scott Brown inherited the Roosevelt bands. Roosevelt Jazz Band has performed and competed all over the nation, and it has traveled internationally. The band has been a finalist 24 times (more than any other band) in the Essentially Ellington Competition in New York City, receiving honorable mention in 2010 and 2018; and winning third place in 2000; second place in 2001, 2005, 2009, 2011, and 2012; and first place in 2002, 2007, 2008, and 2019.

Roosevelt also has a vocal jazz group and multiple after-school jazz bands: Jazz Bands II, III, and IV. Jazz Band III was introduced at the beginning of the 2006–07 school year because of an increased number of jazz musicians arriving at Roosevelt. At the start of the 2016–2017 school year, a fourth jazz band was added due to an even greater number of jazz musicians entering the program.

=== Concert bands ===
Student musicians may join one of two concert bands. Concert Band consists entirely of freshmen, while older students can either be in the Symphonic Band, or the Wind Ensemble, which was created in the 2016–17 school year as a result of the expanding band program.

== Sports ==
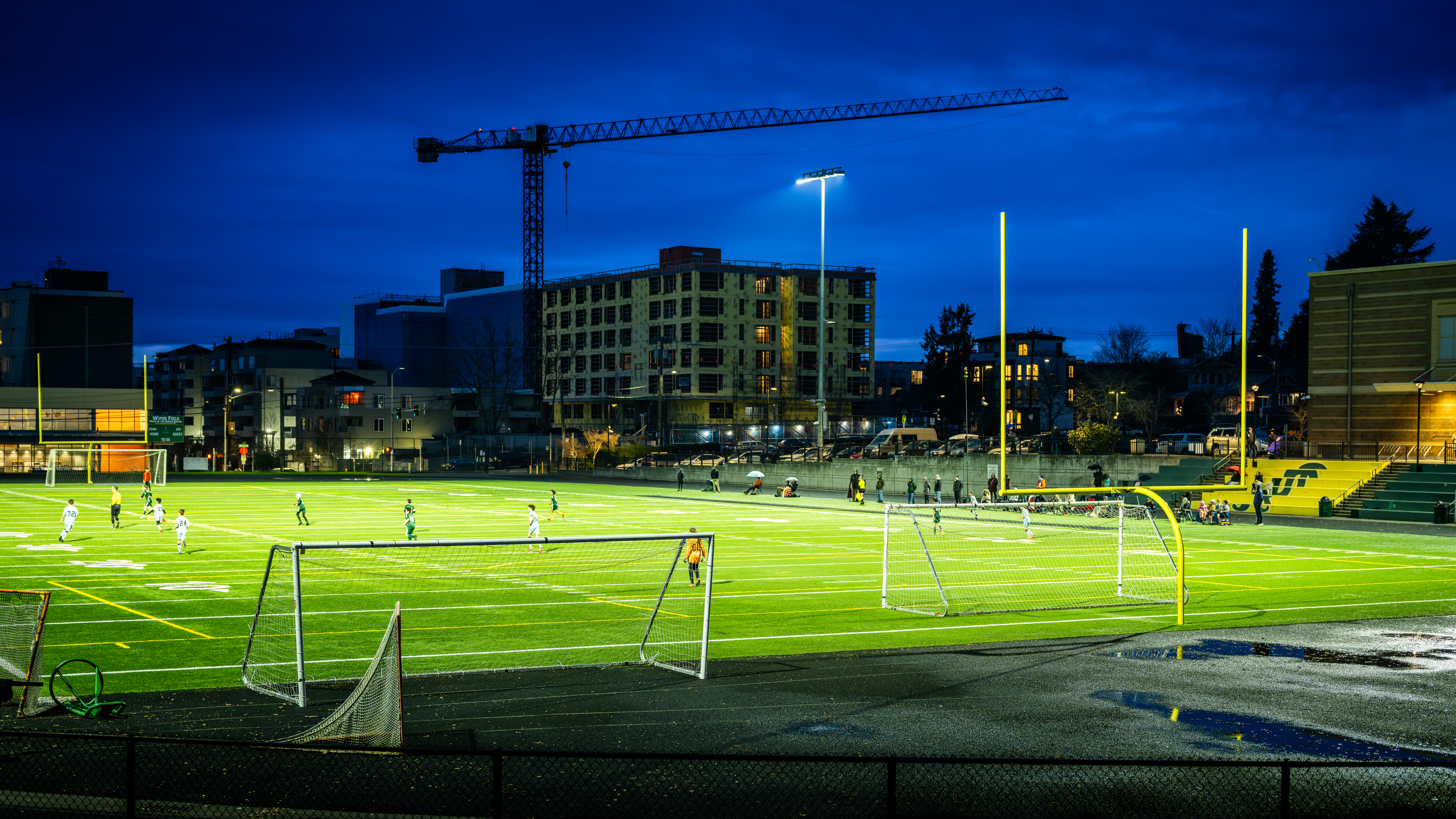
Wiper Field during an evening soccer match.

Roosevelt's teams are named the Roughriders. Roosevelt athletics traditionally participated in the Metro League since its opening until the 1997–98 school year, when Roosevelt, Garfield, and Franklin High Schools moved to the Kingco 4A conference. Ballard High School moved to Kingco 4A in 2000. In 2014–15, Roosevelt, Garfield, and Ballard High schools returned to the Metro 3A Conference.

The school's football, soccer, and athletics stadium is named Wiper Field for former athletic director Art Wiper. It opened in 2006 at the site of the former baseball field.

=== Basketball ===
The boys' basketball team has won three state championships: in 1946, 1973, and 1982. It placed 2nd in 1965 & 1987. The most recent state playoffs appearance occurred in 2009. The girls' basketball team has won one state championship, and had a wide-release theatrical movie, The Heart of the Game, based on their experiences.

=== Golf ===
In 2016, the boys' golf team capped off an undefeated season with a metro, district, and state championship. The girls' golf team won the 2021 Metro League championship.

=== Football ===
The Rough Riders football team lays claim to one state championship, as crowned by the Associated Press in 1950. Since the start of the official state playoffs in 1974, Roosevelt has made it to the state playoffs five times, most recently advancing to the quarterfinals in 2012 and to Round of 16 in 2014.

In 2025, the Washington Interscholastic Activities Association found that Roosevelt High School's football program had broken recruiting rules. The school and some staff members received fines, as did the Seattle Public Schools athletic department and its executive director of athletics. The school must forfeit games played in the past two years in which ineligible players participated and is banned from 2025 postseason competition. WIAA also placed both the school's and school district's athletic departments on probation for three years.

=== Soccer ===
The boys' soccer team has been to the state playoffs fifteen times, placing 4th three times in 1985, 1990, and 2005; 3rd in 2013; and 1st in 2017. After finishing first in 2017, the boys' soccer team was ranked at the end of the year by MaxPreps as the 6th rated boys' soccer team in the US.

The girls' soccer team won the State Championship in 2023 after losing in the State Championship game in 2022. They have been to the state playoffs many times, including winning in 2023, and taking 2nd in 2022, 3rd in 1990, and 2nd in 2000.

Notable players include Meghan Miller, who at Kansas was named 2004 NSCAA Second Team All American; and Wynne McIntosh, 1993 Metro League MVP, Parade All-American, Youth National Team member, and Portland Pilot. McIntosh played professionally in Frau Bundesliga, WUSA, and semi-professionally in W-League, WPSL. 3rd Team All-American, NCAA All-Tournament Team, WCC First Team.

=== Ultimate frisbee ===
Organized as a club sport, the ultimate program at Roosevelt fields single-gender teams for boys and girls in both fall and spring, and coed teams during the winter and at tournaments. The boys' team entered the national stage with impressive wins over Summit, Monarch, and Northwest to win the 2015 Westerns High School Ultimate tournament. They followed up with a 2nd-place finish at the 2015 Seattle Invite Tournament, once again defeating Northwest but losing to Franklin in the finals. At the 2016 Western High School Regional Championships, the boys placed first and the girls took 6th place. In the winter of 2016–2017, varsity and junior varsity teams began participating in the new mixed winter high school league offered by Disc Northwest.

== Languages ==
Roosevelt offers Spanish and French, and is the only school in Seattle Public Schools that offers American Sign Language. It used to offer Japanese and Latin, and was the last Seattle Public Schools school to do so before the programs were cut due to lack of interest, though it is generally agreed that the problem was actually the funding. At one time, Swedish and Russian were also offered.

== Newspaper ==
The Roosevelt News is a National Pacemaker Award-winning paper produced monthly by students and overseen by a staff advisor.

== Demographics ==
As of fall 2016 the student demographics were:

- 69% – White
- 11.6% – Asian
- 7.1% – Hispanic
- 4.4% – African American/Black
- 0.3% – American Indian/Alaska Native
- 7.5% – Multiracial

== Notable alumni ==
Alumni of Roosevelt High School include:

- Jason Andrews — co-founder of Andrews Space and CEO of Spaceflight Industries, Inc.
- Brittain Ashford — musician, Broadway actress
- Lynda Barry — cartoonist, author
- Linda Buck — Nobel Prize winner
- Charles Burns — cartoonist
- Gordon Clinton — former Seattle mayor
- Bo Cornell — former NFL player
- Chris Creighton — college football coach
- Howard Duff — actor
- James Edwards — former NBA player
- Daniel J. Evans — former U.S. senator and governor
- Lee Folkins — former NFL player
- Mary (Maxwell) Gates — mother of Microsoft founder Bill Gates
- Sara Gazarek — jazz singer
- Seth Gordon — director
- David Guterson — author, Snow Falling on Cedars
- Jane Hamsher — producer, author, blogger
- Chris R. Hansen — hedge fund manager
- Nevin Harrison — sprint canoe world champion and Olympic gold medalist
- John Q. Henion – US Army lieutenant general
- Eldon Hoke — musician, The Mentors
- Ruth Jessen — former LPGA golfer
- Sebastian Jones — producer, Friends
- Richard Karn — actor, Home Improvement
- Chad Kimball — actor
- Thomas Kohnstamm — author, Do Travel Writers Go to Hell?
- Ryan Lewis — musician, photographer, director, and DJ
- Robert Lucas, Jr. — Nobel Prize-winning economist
- Wing Luke — assistant attorney general of Washington, Seattle City Council member
- Betty MacDonald — author, The Egg and I
- Emma Marris — journalist and author
- T.J. Martin — Oscar-winning director
- Jim Matheos — musician, Fates Warning
- Rick May — voice and stage actor
- Mike McCready — musician, Pearl Jam
- Rose McGowan — actress and model
- Duff McKagan — musician, Guns N' Roses
- Hugh Millen — former NFL player
- Jonathan Moore — musician, Source of Labor
- William Newman — actor
- Mark Pattison — former NFL player
- Solea Pfeiffer — actress
- Joe Rantz — rower and Olympic gold medalist
- Melissa Reese — musician, keyboardist for Guns N' Roses
- Merle Greene Robertson — Mesoamericanist
- Sir Mix-a-lot — rapper, "Baby Got Back"
- Nikki Sixx — author, musician, Mötley Crüe
- Tom Turnure — former NFL player
- Warren Westlund — rower and Olympic gold medalist
- Marcus Williams — basketball player
- Claire Wilson — Washington State Senator
- James Whitney Young — astronomer with the Jet Propulsion Laboratory
