= The Uncaged Sky: My 804 Days in an Iranian Prison =

2022 memoir by Kylie Moore-Gilbert

- Author: Kylie Moore-Gilbert
- Language: English
- Publication date: 2022

The Uncaged Sky: My 804 Days in an Iranian Prison is a 2022 memoir by Kylie Moore-Gilbert, an Australian academic who was detained in Iran from 2018 to 2020. The book recounts her arrest, imprisonment, and eventual release, while also providing insight into the Iranian prison system. It was published in 2022 by Ultimo Press in Australia and the UK and in 2023 by Urano World in the US.

== Background ==
In September 2018, Kylie Moore-Gilbert was arrested at Tehran Airport by the Islamic Revolutionary Guard Corps. She was subsequently tried on espionage charges in a rushed process and sentenced to ten years in prison. She was imprisoned in Evin Prison (including solitary confinement) and later in the notorious Gharchak (Qarchak) Women's Prison.

On 25 November 2020, Moore-Gilbert was freed in a prisoner exchange with three Iranian nationals sentenced in Thailand for their involvement in the 2012 Bangkok bombings. Since her release, Moore-Gilbert has advocated to secure the release of other Iranian political prisoners.

== Content ==
The book follows Moore-Gilbert's life immediately before her arrest, her ordeal in prison, and her return home. In the epilogue, she reflects on her experience and broader issues: she likens Iran to "an open-air prison of 84 million people" and calls for advocacy for other unjustly imprisoned individuals.

== Reception ==
The book was launched at The Wheeler Centre and was shortlisted for the 2022 Age Book of the Year and for the 2023 Victorian Premier's Prize for Nonfiction.
