= Rough Guides =

Travel Company

- Type: Private
- Industry: Online Travel Agency
- Founded: 1982; 44 years ago
- Founder: Mark Ellingham
- Headquarters: London, United Kingdom
- Area served: United States; Canada; United Kingdom; Australia
- Products: Tailor-Made Trips, Travel Guidebooks
- Number of employees: 50+
- Parent: Apa Digital Group
- Website: www.roughguides.com

Rough Guides is a travel company that offers tailor-made trips planned and arranged by local travel experts based in destinations around the world. Originally established as a guidebook publisher in 1982, Rough Guides expanded into customised travel services in 2018.

== History ==
The first Rough Guide was The Rough Guide to Greece.

In 1995, when Rough Guides were selling around a million books a year, Mark Ellingham entered into a pioneering agreement with HotWired Ventures, the digital offshoot of Wired Ventures, the then-publisher of WIRED magazine. The deal offered free online access to the full text of The Rough Guide to the USA via the World Beat section of HotWired. Ellingham stated at the time that publishing the guides online would facilitate easier updates. "If you could send me an e-mail from Senegal saying this hotel's closed down, I would just key it in," he told the San Francisco Chronicle. "The online book would take on a life of its own".

In May 2007, Mark Ellingham said he had grave concerns about the growth of air travel because of its growing contribution to climate change. He launched an awareness campaign with Tony Wheeler (founder of Lonely Planet), and Rough Guides began including a "health warning" in each of its travel guides, urging readers to "Fly less, stay longer". In November 2007, after celebrating "25 Rough Years" with a series of celebratory books, Ellingham left Rough Guides to set up a new imprint, GreenProfile, at Profile Books.

== Personalised trips ==
In November 2018, Rough Guides launched a personalised trip service.

== Awards ==
From 2017 to 2020 Rough Guides ran a podcast, The Rough Guide to Everywhere. Started by Greg Dickinson, the podcast explored topical travel issues, and showcased interviews with travel personalities. In 2019, series 4 of The Rough Guide to Everywhere (hosted by former senior editor Aimee White) was awarded Bronze in the Best Branded Podcast category at The British Podcast Awards.
