= Kylie Moore-Gilbert =

Australian-British academic (born 1987)

- Born: Gosford, New South Wales, Australia
- Citizenship: Australian; British
- Occupations: Academic, writer Macquarie University
- Known for: Author
- Title: The Uncaged Sky: My 804 Days in an Iranian Prison
- Relatives: Bart Moore-Gilbert (uncle)

Academic background
- Education: Wolfson College, Cambridge; University of Melbourne
- Thesis: Shiʿi opposition and authoritarian transition in contemporary Bahrain: the shifting political participation of a marginalised majority (2017)

Academic work
- Discipline: Political Scientist
- Institutions: University of Melbourne, Macquarie University

Kylie Moore-Gilbert is an Australian-British academic in Middle Eastern political science. She was employed as a lecturer at the University of Melbourne's Asia Institute and has carried out research into contemporary political developments in the Middle East. The subject of her PhD research was post-Arab Spring Bahrain.

Moore-Gilbert was invited to a conference in Iran in 2018. She was detained when she was at the airport preparing to leave the country. From September 2018 to November 2020, she was imprisoned on charges of espionage. She denied the charges, and no evidence for them was ever made public. The Australian government rejected the charges as "baseless and politically motivated".

Moore-Gilbert was released by Iran in a prisoner swap on 25 November 2020, in exchange for three Iranian prisoners in Thailand, who had been sentenced in connection with the 2012 Bangkok bomb plot.

In 2022, Moore-Gilbert wrote a memoir about her experience in Iranian prison titled The Uncaged Sky: My 804 Days in an Iranian Prison.

== Early life and education ==
Kylie Moore-Gilbert graduated from All Saints' College in Bathurst in 2005. From 2009, she studied Asian and Middle Eastern Studies at Wolfson College, Cambridge, and spent a year abroad in Israel as a language student and researcher, including at Ein Prat: the Academy for Leadership.

She graduated with first class honours in Arabic and Hebrew in 2013. In 2017, she obtained a PhD from the University of Melbourne for a thesis entitled Shiʿi Opposition and Authoritarian Transition in Contemporary Bahrain: The Shifting Political Participation of a Marginalised Majority.

== Career ==
After earning her PhD, Moore-Gilbert was appointed Melbourne Early Career Academic Fellow and Lecturer in Islamic Studies at the Asia Institute of the University of Melbourne.

Since 2024 she has worked as a Macquarie University Research Fellow (MQRF) in the School of International Studies.

== Detention in Iran ==
The intelligence arm of the Islamic Revolutionary Guard Corps arrested Moore-Gilbert in September 2018 at Tehran Airport as she was leaving the country after attending an academic conference. She was subsequently tried and sentenced to ten years in prison for espionage. Moore-Gilbert was held in Evin Prison in solitary confinement. Iranian authorities repeatedly tried to recruit her as a spy in exchange for her release, a deal which she declined.

On 28 July 2020, Moore-Gilbert was transferred to Gharchak Women's Prison. In a phone call with Reza Khandan, the husband of jailed human rights lawyer Nasrin Sotoudeh, Moore-Gilbert said she felt hopeless, isolated, and unable to eat. Speaking Persian on the call, she said "I am so depressed. I don't have any phone card to call. I've asked the prison officers but they didn't give me a phone card. I [was last able to] call my parents about one month ago."

After she was jailed, Moore-Gilbert launched a campaign of resistance, including staging several hunger strikes and even escaping from the prison yard onto the roof of the IRGC interrogation block. In May 2020, her family denied reports that she had attempted suicide in prison, or that she had been tortured by the Islamic Revolutionary Guards.

The Sunday Times reported in June 2020 that sources close to Moore-Gilbert's family had informed it of her receiving beatings at the hands of guards, due to her looking out for new prisoners, and suffered injuries on her hands and arms. They also said that the governor of Evin Prison had ordered her to be drugged to break her resistance. One source said that the beatings had caused her to repeatedly fall unconscious and she had major bruises over her entire body. Richard Ratcliffe, husband of Nazanin Zaghari-Ratcliffe who was also held in Evin prison, said Moore-Gilbert was being kept in solitary confinement and was being severely abused, which shocked Iranian activists who knew about it. In August 2020, the Australian 60 Minutes program on the Nine Network aired an episode called "Living Hell" about her imprisonment.

On 24 October 2020, Moore-Gilbert was said to have been transferred from Gharchak to an unknown location. Australian Foreign Minister Marise Payne said the Australian Government was "seeking further information" about Moore-Gilbert's location. On 29 October 2020, Moore-Gilbert was returned to Evin Prison. On 25 November 2020, Iranian state media announced that Moore-Gilbert had been released as part of a prisoner exchange. The Young Journalists Club, a news agency affiliated with Iranian state media, stated that Moore-Gilbert was a "dual national spy [...] who worked for the Zionist regime", and that she had been exchanged for an Iranian 'businessman' and two other Iranian citizens who had been held overseas.

Writing a personal note for the public on the day of her release, Moore-Gilbert wrote that despite her "long and traumatic ordeal" in jail in Iran and the "injustices" she had been subjected to, she departed Iran with the same sentiments as she came in: "as a friend and with friendly intentions."

During her detainment, the official advice to her family from the Australian Government was to keep a low profile, however in 2022 Moore-Gilbert said that greater media attention on her detention would have helped apply more pressure on both the Iranian government and the Department of Foreign Affairs and Trade to negotiate her release.

== After release from prison ==
Moore-Gilbert wrote a memoir titled The Uncaged Sky: My 804 Days in an Iranian Prison, published in 2022 by Ultimo Press in Australia and the UK and in 2023 by Urano World in the US. The book was launched at The Wheeler Centre and was shortlisted for the 2022 Age Book of the Year and for the 2023 Victorian Premier's Prize for Nonfiction.

Moore-Gilbert has made several documentaries about her experiences in Iran, including Escape From Iran with Sky News and How Kylie Moore-Gilbert survived 804 days in Iran's worst prison with 60 Minutes. Since her release Moore-Gilbert has appeared regularly in Australian and international media providing commentary on issues such as Magnitsky sanctions, hostage diplomacy, Australians wrongfully detained abroad, Iran's human rights record and the Mahsa Amini protest movement. She has appeared in episodes of ABC Q+A, 7:30, 60 Minutes, SBS Insight and has written articles for The Atlantic, CNN, The Saturday Paper, The Age and the Australian Strategic Policy Institute. In 2022 she was profiled in the New York Times.

Moore-Gilbert has been vocal in advocating for other victims of hostage diplomacy and wrongful detention abroad, and has spoken publicly about the cases of fellow detained Australians Robert Pether, Cheng Lei and Sean Turnell. She has also been heavily involved in activism against the Iranian government and regularly appears in Iranian opposition media. In 2022, Moore-Gilbert gave the University of Sydney Michael Hintze Lecture titled Hostage Diplomacy: Who's in Control? In 2023, she gave evidence at the Australian Senate Inquiry into Human rights implications of recent violence in Iran. Later that year, the Centre for International Security Studies at the University of Sydney appointed Moore-Gilbert a Visiting Fellow to study international collaboration on hostage diplomacy policy.

== Personal life ==
Gilbert married Ruslan Hodorov, an Israeli national of Russian heritage, in a Jewish ceremony in 2017. In April 2021, she announced that she was divorcing him after she found out that he had been having an affair with Kylie Baxter, her colleague and PhD supervisor, and also an intermediary between University of Melbourne and her family during Moore-Gilbert's imprisonment.

In April 2023, the magazine Good Weekend published an account of Moore-Gilbert's relationship with Sami Shah, a comedian and former ABC radio presenter. Later that year they had a daughter. In October 2023, the family was the subject of an episode of the ABC Television program, Australian Story.

== See also ==
- List of foreign nationals detained in Iran
- Australia–Iran relations
- Hostage diplomacy
