= Tom Griffiths (historian) =

Australian historian

Thomas Rhys Griffiths AO (born 1957) is an Australian historian. As of 2025 he is W K Hancock Professor of History in the Research School of Social Sciences at the Australian National University. He is also the author of many prize-winning books and essays, notably his 2016 work The Art of Time Travel: Historians and their Craft.

== Early life and education ==
Thomas Rhys Griffiths, usually known as Tom Griffiths, was born in 1957. His parents had scientific training and also enjoyed and studied culture, and his family home had an extensive collection of books.

He attended the University of Melbourne in Melbourne, Victoria, during the 1970s. He has described being inspired by his lecturer, historian Greg Dening, in 1977, and said that it was only in his second and third years at university that he really "fell in love with history", thanks to Dening, Donna Merwick, and Pat Grimshaw, whom he described as "literary-minded historians".

Griffiths later earned a PhD, with his later book Hunters and Collectors: The Antiquarian Imagination in Australia (1996) based on his thesis.

== Career ==
Griffiths' first professional work was in public history, becoming a consultant to Museums Victoria, field officer at the State Library of Victoria, and historian in the state government Department of Conservation, Forests and Lands. He did some casual tutoring and also started his PhD during this time. His work with the department led him into researching the history of forests and fire.

When he was in his early thirties (around 1990) he was appointed lecturer in public history at Monash University.

Griffiths travelled to Antarctica in summer 2002–3 as a humanities fellow with the Australian Antarctic Division. The ship left on 17 December and returned on 8 January, and Griffith spent five days at Casey Station.

In 2008 he was a Distinguished Visiting Professor of Australian Studies at the University of Copenhagen, followed by an appointment as adjunct professor of climate research at the university, from 2009 until 2013.

In 2012 Griffith was invited by the Australian Government to join the centennial voyage, to mark the occasion of the expedition led by Sir Douglas Mawson known as the Australasian Antarctic Expedition, to Mawson's Huts in Antarctica.

He spent some time working in international academic diplomacy at the Menzies Centre for Australian Studies in London.

His research, writing, and teaching is focused on Australian social, cultural, and environmental history; comparative global environmental history; public history; the writing of non-fiction; and the history of Antarctica. He said in 2017 that he is always focused on bringing together history and natural history, and connecting the sciences and the humanities.

As of 2025 he is W K Hancock Professor of History (Note: Named for Australian historian Keith Hancock (1898–1988).) in the Research School of Social Sciences at ANU; chair of the editorial board of the Australian Dictionary of Biography; and director of the Centre for Environmental History at ANU. He is an emeritus professor.

=== Writing ===
Griffith based used his own diary entries from his 2002–3 trip to Antarctica, as well as other sources to produce a book of essays on Antarctic history, science, and culture, titled Slicing the Silence: Voyaging to Antarctica, published in 2007.

In 2014 Griffiths published The Art of Time Travel: Historians and their Craft, in which he wrote about lives and vocations of 14 Australian historians and other colleagues. The professional historians include his former lecturer Greg Dening, along with Keith Hancock, John Mulvaney, Geoffrey Blainey, Henry Reynolds, Donna Merwick, Graeme Davison, Inga Clendinnen, and Grace Karskens. Poet and historian Barry Hill, writing in The Monthly, wrote: "The Art of Time Travel should be in every school and library".

In 2020 he wrote an essay about climate change, called "Born in the ice age, humankind now faces the age of fire – and Australia is on the frontline", published as part of the anthology Fire, Flood and Plague, edited by Sophie Cunningham.

== Other activities ==
Griffiths gave a speech at the launch of the book of essays about historian Ken Inglis, titled "I Wonder": The Life and Work of Ken Inglis (edited by Peter Browne and Seumas Spark) at Readings Carlton on 10 March 2020.

== Recognition and honours ==
=== Writing ===
Griffiths' books and essays have won a range of awards, including the Douglas Stewart Prize for Non-Fiction, the Eureka Science Book Prize, the Alfred Deakin Prize for an Essay Advancing Public Debate, and the Prime Minister's Prize for Australian History. In 2012 Australia and the Antarctic Treaty System, which Griffith co-edited with Marcus Howard, was joint winner of the Best Tertiary Scholarly Resource in the Australian Educational Publishing Awards.

Slicing the Silence: Voyaging to Antarctica (2007) won the Queensland and NSW Premier's Awards for Non-Fiction, and was the joint winner of the Prime Minister's Prize for Australian History in 2008.

The Art of Time Travel: Historians and their Craft won the 2017 Ernest Scott Prize for History and the 2017 ACT Book of the Year Award.

=== Personal ===
Personal honours and recognition include:

- 2001: Centenary Medal, "For service to Australian society and the humanities in the study of Australian history"
- 2014: Officer of the Order of Australia, on the Queen's Birthday Honours List, for "distinguished service to tertiary education, particularly social, cultural and environmental history, and through popular and academic contributions to Australian literature"

== Personal life ==
On Australia Day 2025, when asked to choose "an essential Australia Day read... crucial to understanding our culture and history", Griffiths selected Truth: the third pillar, and "Voice and Treaty", from the Uluru Statement from the Heart, to show the true history of the colonisation of Australia. He also mentioned two poems by Indigenous poets: Natalie Harkin's "Archival-Poetics" and Ambelin Kwaymullina's "Living on Stolen Land", and a recently published work, Näku Dhäruk: The Bark Petitions, by historian Clare Wright.

== Publications ==
=== Books ===
- Beechworth: An Australian Country Town and its Past (1987)
- Koori history : sources for Aboriginal studies in the State Library of Victoria (editor, 1989)
- Prehistory to Politics: John Mulvaney, the Humanities and the Public Intellectual (co-author, with Tim Bonyhady, 1992)
- Secrets of the forest : discovering history in Melbourne's Ash Range (1992)
- Science in high places : the cultural significance of scientific sites in the Australian Alps : final report (co-author, with Libby Robin, 1994)
- Hunters and Collectors: The Antiquarian Imagination in Australia (1996)
- Ecology and empire : environmental history of settler societies (co-editor, with Libby Robin, 1997)
- Forests of Ash: An Environmental History (2001)
- A change in the weather : climate and culture in Australia (co-editor, with Tim Sherratt and Libby Robin, 2004)
- Slicing the Silence: Voyaging to Antarctica (2007)
- Frontier, race, nation : Henry Reynolds and Australian history (co-editor, with Bain Attwood)
- Australia and the Antarctic Treaty System (co-editor, with Marcus Haward, 2012)
- Living with fire : people, nature and history in Steels Creek (co-author, with Christine Hansen, 2012) – "examines how one community rebuilt and redefined itself following the Black Saturday fires"
- The Art of Time Travel: Historians and their Craft (2016)

=== Essays and articles ===
- "The Transformative Craft of Environmental History: Perspectives on Australian Scholarship". In: Visions of Australia: Environments in History, edited by Christof Mauch, Ruth Morgan, and Emily O’Gorman. RCC Perspectives: Transformations in Environment and Society 2017, no. 2, 115–24. doi.org/10.5282/rcc/7915 (Published by the Rachel Carson Center)

== Personal life ==
Griffiths has children.
