= Kraków UNESCO City of Literature =

Kraków UNESCO City of Literature is a City of Literature located in Kraków, Poland, as a member of the UNESCO Creative Cities Network. Kraków joined the UCCN on 21 October 2013 as the first Slavic and second non-English speaking city. Kraków's main objective as a UNESCO City of Literature is to develop and implement a program promoting literary heritage, popularize reading among its residents, and support the local book market. Kraków UNESCO City of Literature also functions as a coordinator for the Cities of Literature and a member of the UCCN Steering Committee.

The Kraków UNESCO City of Literature program is operated by the Kraków Festival Office.

== Program ==
The program followed by Kraków City of Literature involves activities and initiatives in the following 10 areas of development:

1. Integrating literary life in all its richness and variety
2. Establishing links between literature, new media and creative industries
3. Creating reading attitudes
4. Organising literary events and festivals
5. Supporting book industries
6. Initiating and supporting the presence of literature in public space
7. Developing scholarship programs
8. Developing the interrelationships between literature and human rights
9. Reinforcing international literary cooperation
10. Literary education

== Projects ==
=== Festivals ===
Kraków UNESCO City of Literature hosts two large literary festivals, i.e. the Conrad Festival (the greatest Polish event of its type), and the Milosz Festival. Both festivals were in 2017 granted the EFFE Label which is awarded by the European Festivals Association to events of international rank and distinctive artistic quality that are characterized by high involvement of the local community.

=== Debut support ===
Kraków UNESCO City of Literature is involved in supporting young talents and literary debutants. Each year, during the Conrad Festival, the Conrad Award is awarded for the best literary debut. The “Promoters of Debuts” program has been developed in order to ensure funds for publishing houses to cover the cost of publication of debutant works. In addition, there is a UNESCO City of Literature Creative Writing Course which unites and educates young talents supervised by renowned and experienced writers.

=== Read PL! ===
Read PL! is a project created in cooperation with the Woblink.com e-book platform to promote reading through permitting free access to electronic versions of new book arrivals and bestsellers. In public places (mostly at bus/tram stops and in schools) the organisers post posters with QR codes which can be scanned with the Woblink application to offer free access to selected books.

=== City Codes ===
Within the City Codes project, the benches in the Kraków Planty Park have been marked with special tablets with the names of writers who have been important for the city of Kraków, together with QR codes that refer to websites with fragments of texts by specific authors, as well as their Polish and English audio versions.

=== Multipoetry. Poems on the walls ===
During the first week of every month, poems written by authors connected with other Cities of Literature – Dublin, Edinburgh, Iowa City, Melbourne, Norwich and Reykjavik – were displayed on the wall of the Potocki Family Tenement House at 20 Main Market Square in 2014 and 2015.

=== Literary walks ===
Kraków UNESCO City of Literature organises cyclical literary walks whereby readers led by their guides have an opportunity to see buildings and places that used to be or that are important for the most outstanding writers living in Kraków. Several literary routes have been delineated so far within the project, including those dedicated to Wisława Szymborska, Czesław Miłosz, Stanisław Lem, Stanisław Wyspiański or Joseph Conrad.

=== Champion Bookstores in Kraków ===
The project focuses on the cooperation with stationary bookstores in Kraków. It has been developed for the sake of readers, book lovers, and booksellers. Its task is to support the Kraków book market through the integration, coordination and implementation of the rich program of cultural events in Kraków stationary bookstores. The project is to equip booksellers with additional tools and promotion methods, to enrich their cultural offer, and build permanent relationships with readers.

=== Kraków Book Fair ===
The Kraków Book Fair is a cyclic event that promotes the idea of second-hand book circulation. It is held once in every several weeks at the St. Mary Magdalene Square in Kraków, where a dozen or so of Kraków antiquarians and second-hand booksellers put up their stands and present their offer. The fair is always accompanied by discussions, literary meetings, and open-air shows.

=== Independent Bookstore Festival ===
Independent Bookstore Festival is a project implemented in bookstores by the Copernicus Foundation under the patronage of Kraków UNESCO City of Literature. The Festival is a year-round series of events organised by booksellers for all readers who want to talk with one another about books.

=== Read locally ===
The project aims at promoting bookstores as cultural centres and places where social ties begin. Read locally promotes most unique bookstores that carry out unique, proprietary and bottom-up cultural activity. The project includes a series of interviews with the staff and with famous frequent visitors of most interesting bookstores in Kraków.

=== The Second Life of a Book ===
The action facilitates free book exchange. It is held cyclically at most interesting places that are connected with literature.

== International cooperation ==
=== ICORN (International Cities of Refuge Network) ===
ICORN is an independent network of cities that offer a shelter to writers and artists persecuted for their creative work. It acts in defence of the freedom of expression and of democratic values. It also acts for international solidarity. The network’s member cities offer refuge to those who cannot freely live and create in their own homelands due to persecutions. ICORN’s main objective is to ensure asylum to as many persecuted writers and artists as possible, and to establish a permanent global network to defend the freedom of expression together with its sister organisations. Within the ICORN program in 2011-2017, Kraków hosted seven writers: Maria Amelie (born Madina Salamowa – North Ossetia, today in Norway), Kareem Amer (Egypt/today in Norway), Mostafa Zamaninij (Iran), Lawon Barszczewski (Belarus), Asli Erdogan (Turkey), Felix Kaputu (Congo), and Monem Mahjoub (Libya). While implementing the ICORN program, Kraków City of Literature cooperates with the Villa Decius Association that coordinates the residents’ stay and offers them space for their creative work.

=== Drop the Mic. Nordic-Baltic Slam Poetry Network ===
Drop the Mic is a project that aims at creating an international space for poets, writers, authors of texts, and organisers of festivals and poetry slams that support performative literature. The project is to popularize the idea of poetry slams and to integrate poets and other authors at international level through their joint participation in projects. So far, events within the Drop the Mic (meetings, workshops, poetry slams) have been held in Reykjavik (Iceland), Tartu (Estonia), Copenhagen (Dania), Heidelberg (Germany), and Kraków.

=== Engage! Young Producers ===
Engage! Young Producers is an international educational project aimed at promoting young people’s committed participation in literary and cultural life interpreted as a means to develop their critical thinking skills and better comprehension of multicultural reality. The project is addressed mainly to secondary school students (between 16 and 19 years of age), especially those with little access to culture, and to all local organisations and cultural institutions whose activity involves literature. Engage! is held simultaneously in several European cities (Barcelona, Norwich, Växjö, Kraków), and always with the support of secondary schools, libraries and cultural institutions that develop their own customized programs so as to best apply the general objectives of the complete Engage! project. Within the Engage! Young Producers project the Kraków Festival Office implements a yearly education program for secondary school students – Word for Word. Poetry is my language.

=== Kraków UNESCO City of Literature Residency Program ===
The residency program is addressed to writers and authors from the other UNESCO Cities of Literature. During their stipend stay in Kraków, residents have an opportunity to experience Kraków literary life, establish contacts with the local literary industry and writers. So far, Kraków has hosted Brynjar Jóhannesson from Reykjavík, Sarah Stewart from Edinburgh, and Sarah Herman from Norwich.
