= Julie Szego =

Australian journalist and author

Julie Szego is an Australian author and journalist.

== Career ==
Szego started working as a lawyer before switching to writing. She wrote for The Age on and off for more than two decades as a social affairs reporter, senior writer, leader writer and weekly columnist, until her dismissal in 2023. Szego wrote a monthly column for The Australian Jewish News for seven years and edited her father's 2001 memoir, Two Prayers to One God. She also wrote for The Guardian.

She has taught journalism and creative non-fiction at RMIT, Monash, and other Melbourne-area universities.

Szego is the author of the non-fiction book The Tainted Trial of Farah Jama, which was shortlisted for the Victorian and NSW Premiers’ Literary Awards for 2015.

== Other activity ==
In March 2023, Szego attended an anti-trans rally, which was organised by British anti-transgender rights activist Kellie-Jay Keen-Minshull, on the steps of the Victorian parliament house. Szego has stated that she attended the rally as a journalist. In 2025, Szego spoke at another anti-trans rally in the same location.

In June 2023, Szego was sacked from her position at The Age after making public comments saying that a "committee of woke journalists" at the newspaper had silenced her by refusing to publish her article on youth gender transition. The chief editor of The Age, Patrick Elligett, stated that Szego was not sacked for the content of the article, but for her repeated public criticisms of the newspaper and its staff. The controversy was covered by the ABC's Media Watch program in a segment that generated controversy of its own, as the Media Watch segment did not acknowledge that Szego's article utilised information from known anti-trans misinformation groups and promoted fringe conspiracy theories. Szego's article and the Media Watch segment were condemned by human rights groups including Amnesty International.

In November 2023, Szego resigned from the Media, Entertainment and Arts Alliance (MEAA) because of that union's endorsement of an open letter from journalists to Australian media outlets about coverage of the Gaza genocide. Szego called the letter "an Orwellian exercise in calling for 'truth' while peddling gross distortions thereof". In April 2024, Szego published an article for the Jewish Independent stating her support for continuing the Israeli invasion of the Gaza Strip.
