= Louise Milligan =

Australian investigative journalist

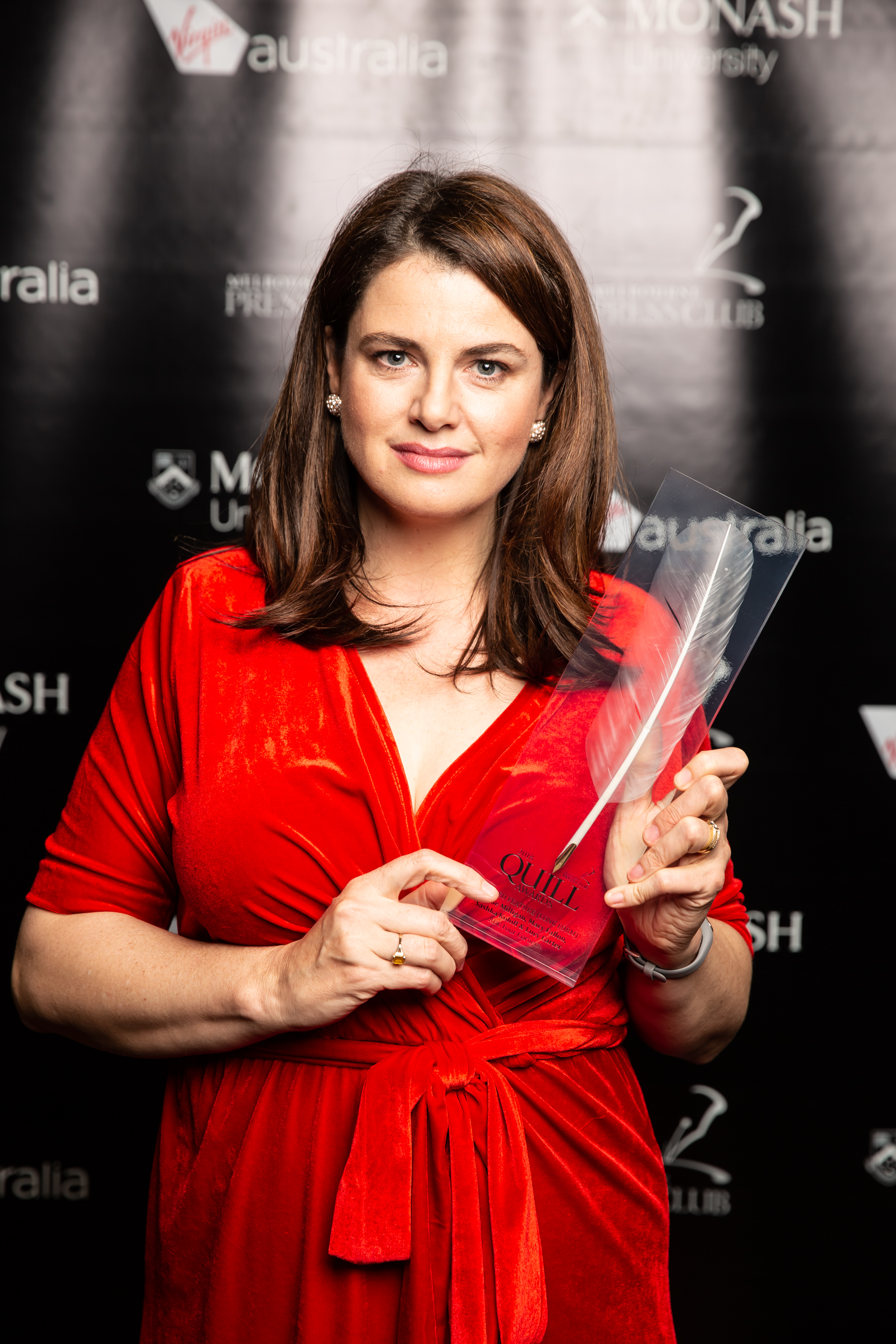
- Milligan with TV/Video Feature (Long Form) award at Melbourne Press Club Quills, March 2019.
- Born: Dublin, Ireland
- Occupations: Journalist, author
- Years active: 2004–present
- Employer: Australian Broadcasting Corporation

Louise Milligan is an Australian author and investigative reporter for the ABC TV Four Corners program. She has written award-winning non-fiction books, and her first novel, Pheasants Nest, was published in 2024.

== Early life and education ==
Born in Dublin, Ireland, Louise Milligan grew up in the Roman Catholic faith, but says she no longer follows that religion. She moved with her family to Australia when she was six.

She graduated from Monash University in Melbourne with an arts/law degree. She later took a graduate diploma in journalism at RMIT University.

== Career ==
=== Journalism ===
Early in her career Milligan was High Court reporter for The Australian. She subsequently spent seven years reporting for Seven News, where she specialised in freedom of information, before joining ABC News.

In 2015 Milligan travelled to Indonesia to cover the executions of "Bali Nine" group members Andrew Chan and Myuran Sukumaran, and after that covered the Royal Commission into Institutional Responses to Child Sexual Abuse in Ballarat. She reported on the allegations of sexual abuse against George Pell for ABC Television's 7.30.

In March 2024, Milligan reported for Four Corners on a toxic culture for female staff at Cranbrook School in Sydney as it prepared to transition from boys only to co-ed.

As of May 2024 Milligan is an investigative reporter the ABC TV program Four Corners.

=== Long-form writing ===
Melbourne University Press (MUP) published Milligan's first book, Cardinal, in May 2017. A month later MUP withdrew the book from bookshops across Victoria in response to Victoria Police charging Cardinal George Pell with historic sex assault. Cardinal was returned to Victorian bookshops in February 2019.

In 2022, she published Witness, which critiques the criminal justice system in sexual assault trials. It includes interviews with prosecutors, defence counsel, solicitors, judges, and academic experts, and also highlights two high-profile cases which she had covered as a journalist. Milligan reveals how plaintiffs often feel as if it is they who are being tried, and legal practitioners also find it very stressful because of its adversarial nature. In the book she also describes how she was cross-examined in the Pell committal by Robert Richter, realising that she was not sufficiently protected by the Evidence Act s 41, and puts a strong case for legal reform in this area. QUT law professor Ben Mathews called Witness balanced, and "a triumph of intellect and empathy". The book was generally well-received, although Aboriginal writer Ellen O'Brien, writing in the Sydney Review of Books, points to its deficits in coverage of the additional complexities involved when Aboriginal women are the victim-survivors.

Milligan's friend Louise Adler, of Melbourne University Press and then Hachette Australia, published her non-fiction books.

In March 2024 Milligan published her first novel, Pheasants Nest, a crime fiction thriller. The book was influenced by the rape and murder of Jill Meagher in Melbourne in 2012, after Milligan was the first journalist to interview Meagher's husband, and explores the idea of a woman in a similar situation who survives such an attack. The name is derived from a notorious suicide spot, Pheasants Nest bridge, which is on the Hume Highway and crosses the Nepean River in New South Wales. It also includes themes of police officers' untreated PTSD. Milligan started writing the novel in 2015, and returned to it in 2022, when she took a break from journalism.

Her second novel, Shellybanks, is due to be published by Allen & Unwin in March 2026.

== Other activities ==
In 2019, Milligan was invited to give the Castan Centre for Human Rights Law annual lecture. Her talk was titled "A journalist's defence of trial procedures".

== Awards and recognition ==
=== Reporting awards ===
- 2016 Quill Award for Coverage of an Issue or Event, Melbourne Press Club, winner with Andy Burn for ABC report, "George Pell and Sexual Abuse in the Catholic Church"
- 2017 Sport Australia Media Awards for Best Reporting of an Issue in Sport, winner with Lisa McGregor and Trish Drum for "After the Game" (Four Corners)
- 2017 Law Reporting Award presented by the Sir Owen Dixon Chambers
- 2019 Australian Press Council Press Freedom Medal

=== Book awards ===
Year	Work	Award	Category	Result	Ref
2017	Cardinal	Walkley Book Award	—	Won	
2018	Cardinal	Australian Book Industry Awards	Small Publisher Adult Book	Shortlisted	
2018	Cardinal	Davitt Award	Non-fiction / True Crime	Shortlisted	
2018	Cardinal	Davitt Award	Debut	Shortlisted	
2018	Cardinal	Melbourne Prize for Literature	Civic Choice Award	Won	
2021	Witness	Colin Roderick Award	—	Shortlisted	
2021	Witness	Davitt Award	Non-fiction / True Crime	Won	
2021	Witness	Ned Kelly Awards	True Crime	Finalist	
2021	Witness	Stella Prize	—	Shortlisted	
2021	Witness	Victorian Premier's Literary Awards	People's Choice Award	Won	
2021	Witness	Victorian Premier's Literary Awards	Nonfiction	Shortlisted	

== Defamation suits ==
In March 2021, the Australian Attorney-General Christian Porter commenced defamation proceedings against Milligan for an article published on 26 February 2021 which he says made a false rape allegation against him. Porter discontinued the action in May 2021 after the ABC agreed to post an editorial note to the original publication and to pay mediation costs.

In June 2021, federal MP Andrew Laming commenced defamation proceedings against Milligan for four tweets sent on 28 March 2021. He alleged one tweet implied he admitted to illegally taking a photo of a woman's underwear as she bent over in Brisbane in 2019. In August 2021 Milligan agreed to pay Laming approximately A$130,000 in damages and fees.

== Bibliography ==
=== Books ===
- Milligan, Louise (2017). Cardinal: The Rise and Fall of George Pell. Melbourne University Press. ISBN 9780522871340.
- —— (2020). Witness: An Investigation into the Brutal Cost of Seeking Justice. Hachette Australia. ISBN 9780733644634.
- —— (2024). Pheasants Nest. Allen & Unwin. ISBN 9781761470349.

== Critical studies and reviews of Milligan's work ==
=== Witness ===
- Silcox, Beejay (January–February 2021). "Curial bollockings : the monstrous cost of seeking justice". Australian Book Review. 428: 15–16.
