= Indelible City =

Hong Kong studies book

- Author: Louisa Lim
- Cover artist: Lucia Bernard
- Language: English
- Genre: Nonfiction
- Publisher: Riverhead Books
- Publication date: April 19, 2022
- Publication place: United States of America
- Pages: 306
- ISBN: 978-0-593-19181-1

Indelible City: Dispossession and Defiance in Hong Kong is a 2022 nonfiction book by Louisa Lim, published by Riverhead Books, discussing Hong Kong. The full text is divided into eight chapters across three parts, excluding the prologue and epilogue.

In the work she reconciles with her Hong Kong identity while perceiving a drastic decline in Hong Kong. Jennifer Szalai of The New York Times wrote that the work is "unapologetically personal".

== Background ==
Lim, of Eurasian ancestry, has heritage from an ethnic Chinese Singaporean father and a British mother. She worked as a journalist, living in China for around 10 years, and having experience working for BBC and National Public Radio (NPR). She stated that her level of speaking Cantonese was "shamefully basic" but she identifies as a Hong Konger regardless.

Lim used the National Archives of the United Kingdom as part of her research.

== Contents ==
Lim argues that it is impossible to be unconcerned about political affairs whilst being a Hong Konger. A section discusses the legal actions Tsang Tsou-choi took against land appropriation until his death.

The initial part of the book covers the 2019 Hong Kong protests where Lim feels conflict in needing to protect her homeland versus needing to cover the event in a neutral way for journalism.

== Reception ==
Amy Qin of The New York Times wrote that Lim had her "sharpest criticism" aimed at the government of the United Kingdom, instead of that of China, and that Lim explored a history of Hong Kong that is influenced by neither China nor the UK.

Publishers Weekly gave the book a starred review, concluding that it "is a vivid and vital contribution to postcolonial history."

Joshua Wallace of Tarleton State University, writing for Library Journal, gave the book a starred review and described it as "A fascinating work".

== Awards and recognition ==
Indelible City was shortlisted for the 2023 Victorian Premier's Literary Award for Nonfiction and the 2023 Stella Prize.

== See also ==
- The People's Republic of Amnesia- Lim's initial work
