= A Child's Book of True Crime =

2002 novel by Chloe Hooper

- Author: Chloe Hooper
- Language: English
- Genre: Crime novel
- Publisher: Penguin
- Publication date: March 19, 2002
- Publication place: Australia
- Pages: 238
- ISBN: 0-7432-2512-0

A Child's Book of True Crime is a novel by Australian author Chloe Hooper, published in 2002 by Penguin. It was shortlisted for the 2002 Women's Prize for Fiction.

== Summary ==
Kate is a young schoolteacher working in a small community in Tasmania. She begins an affair with the parent of one of her students. Some chapters tell an alternate version of the same story, a murder investigation written in the style of a children's book.

== Reception ==
The Guardian described it as "a Russian doll of a novel" and praised it as "beguiling", while The New Yorker said it was "suspenseful and self-conscious". The A.V. Club gave a mixed review, stating that the short book is "padded by redundant passages", while saying parts of the book were "vivid and witty".

A Child's Book of True Crime was shortlisted for the Women's Prize for Fiction in 2002.
