= Lonely Planet =

Publisher of travel guidebooks

- Parent company: Lonely Planet Global, Inc.
- Founded: 1973; 53 years ago
- Founders: Tony Wheeler; Maureen Wheeler
- Country of origin: Australia
- Headquarters location: Fort Mill, South Carolina, U.S.
- Distribution: Grantham Book Service (UK); Hachette Book Group (North America); United Book Distributors (Australia)
- Key people: Paul Yanover (CEO; December 2024-present)
- Publication types: Books; Mobile apps Video; Magazine
- Nonfiction topics: Travel guides (worldwide)
- Owner: Red Ventures
- No. of employees: 450 writers
- Official website: lonelyplanet.com

Lonely Planet is a travel guide book publisher. Founded in Australia in 1973, the company has printed over 150 million books.

== History ==
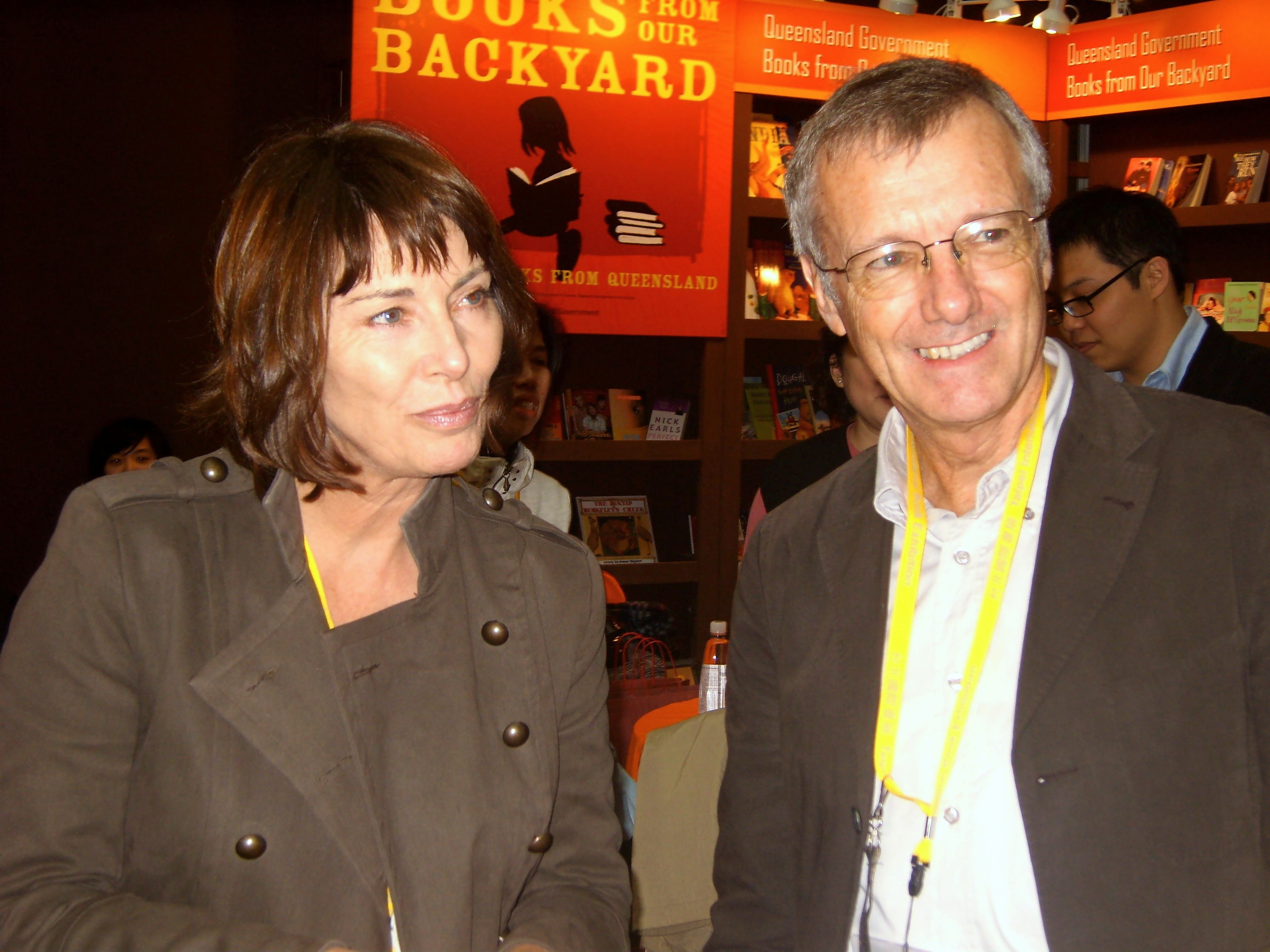
Maureen Wheeler and Tony Wheeler, the two co-founders of Lonely Planet, in 2008

=== 20th century ===
Lonely Planet was founded by married couple Maureen and Tony Wheeler. In 1972, they embarked on an overland trip through Europe and Asia to Australia following the route of the Oxford and Cambridge Far Eastern Expedition.

The company name originates from the misheard "lovely planet" in a song written by Matthew Moore. Lonely Planet's first book, Across Asia on the Cheap, had 94 pages; it was written by the couple in their home. The original 1973 print run consisted of stapled booklets with pale blue cardboard covers.

Wheeler returned to Asia to write Across Asia on the Cheap: A Complete Guide to Making the Overland Trip, published in 1975.

The Lonely Planet guide book series initially expanded to cover other countries in Asia, with the India guide book in 1981, and expanded to the rest of the world later. Geoff Crowther was renowned for frequently inserting his opinions into the text of the guides he wrote. His writing was instrumental to the rise of Lonely Planet. The journalist used the term "Geoffness" to describe Crowther's writing style, a quality that has been lost in travel guides.

By 1999, Lonely Planet had sold 30 million copies of its travel guides. The company's authors consequently benefited from profit-sharing and expensive events were held at the Melbourne office, at which Lonely Planet authors would arrive in limousines.

=== 21st century ===
The 16th edition of Lonely Planet's Australia guide, published in 2011

In 2007, the Wheelers and John Singleton sold a 75% stake in the company to BBC Worldwide, worth an estimated £63 million at the time. The company was publishing 500 titles and ventured into television production. BBC Worldwide struggled following the acquisition, registering a £3.2 million loss in the year to the end of March 2009. By the end of March 2010, profits of £1.9 million had been generated, as digital revenues had risen 37% year-on-year over the preceding 12 months, a Lonely Planet magazine had grown and non-print revenues increased from 9% in 2007 to 22%.

Lonely Planet's digital presence included 140 apps and 8.5 million unique users for lonelyplanet.com, which hosted the Thorn Tree travel forum. In 2011, BBC Worldwide acquired the remaining 25% of the company for £42.1 million (A$67.2 million) from the Wheelers.

==== BBC's sale to NC2 ====
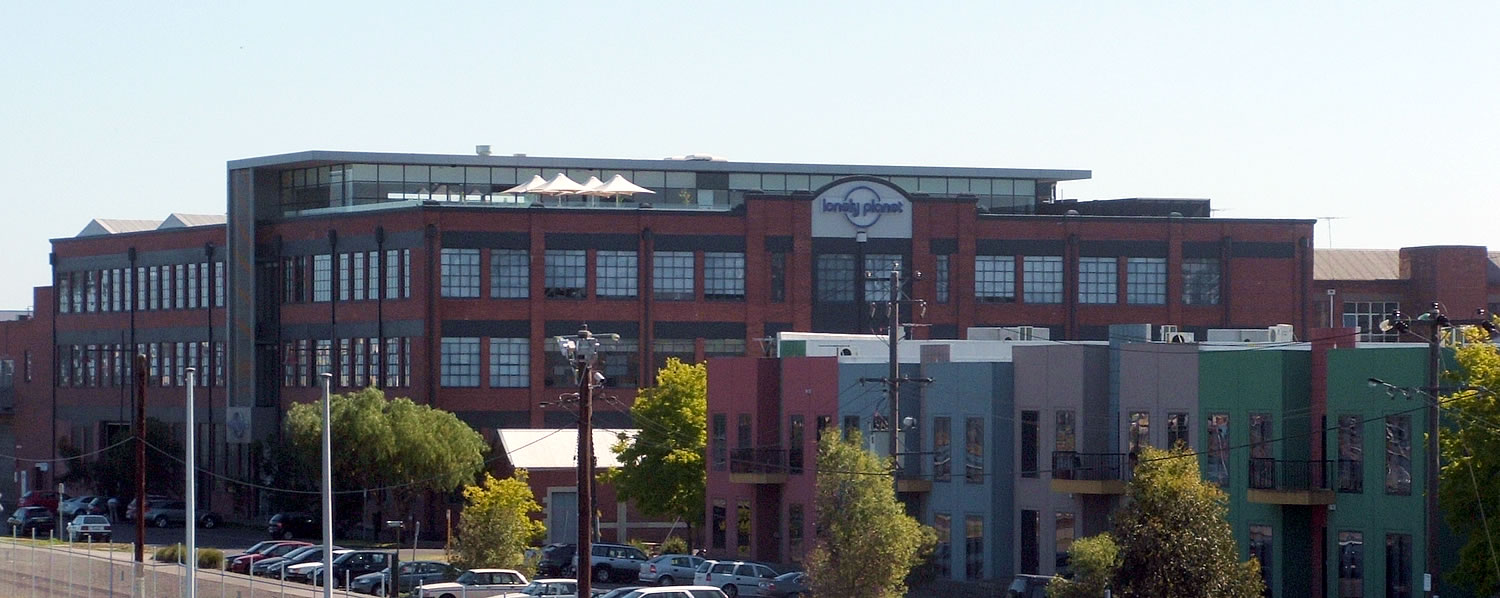
Lonely Planet's former headquarters in Footscray, Victoria, in 2006

By 2012, the BBC wanted to divest itself of the company and in March 2013 confirmed the sale of Lonely Planet to Brad Kelley's NC2 Media for US$77.8 million (£51.5 million), at nearly an £80 million (US$118.89 million) loss.

==== Red Ventures ====
In December 2020, NC2 Media sold Lonely Planet to Red Ventures for an undisclosed amount. Lonely Planet offices continue to operate in Dublin, Nashville and New Delhi. Phillippe von Borries, a former co-founder and CEO of Refinery29, was named head of the company.

In 2022, Lonely Planet bought Elsewhere, a website that links travellers directly with experts who assist in designing trips. Elsewhere was renamed Lonely Planet Journeys in 2025.

In 2024, Lonely Planet announced that it had withdrawn from the market in China and ceased publishing travel guides in simplified Chinese.

== Products ==
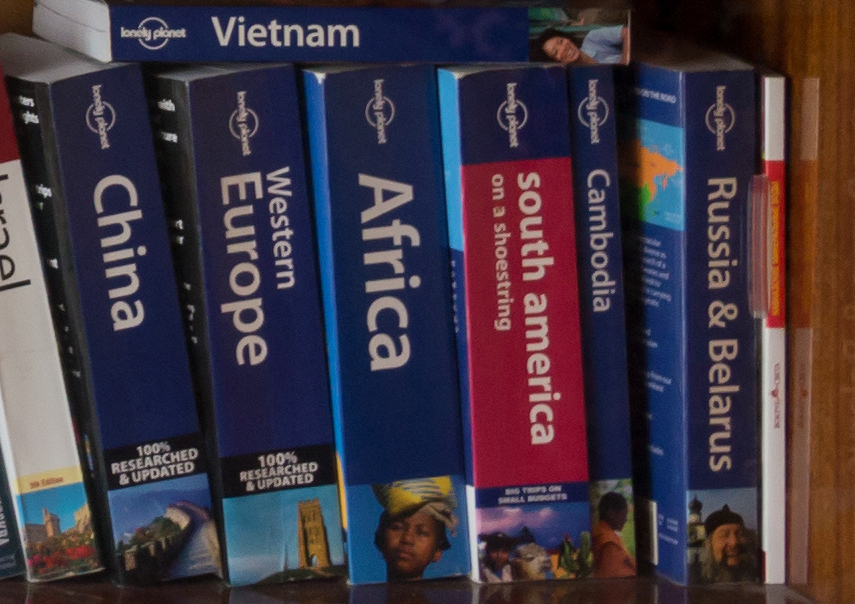
Lonely Planet guide books

Lonely Planet's online community, the Thorn Tree, was created in 1996. It is named for a Naivasha thorn tree (Acacia xanthophloea) that has been used as a message board for the city of Nairobi, Kenya since 1902. The tree still exists in the Stanley Hotel, Nairobi. In April 2020, the forum was locked and left in read-only mode as part of Lonely Planet temporarily halting business in response to the COVID-19 pandemic. In September 2021, the Thorn Tree was shut down.

In 2009, Lonely Planet began publishing a monthly travel magazine called Lonely Planet Traveller. It was available in digital versions for a number of countries. Publication ceased in April 2020.

Lonely Planet also had its own television production company, which has produced series such as Globe Trekker, Lonely Planet Six Degrees and Lonely Planet: Roads Less Travelled. Toby Amies and Asha Gill (both British TV presenters) took part in Lonely Planet Six Degrees.

== Controversies ==
In 1996, in response to a "Visit Myanmar" campaign by the Burmese military government, the Burmese opposition National League for Democracy (NLD) and its leader Aung San Suu Kyi called for a tourism boycott. As the publication of Lonely Planet's guidebook to Myanmar (Burma) is seen by some as an encouragement to visit that country, this led to calls for a boycott of Lonely Planet. Lonely Planet's argued that it highlighted the issues surrounding a visit to the country and that it wanted to help readers make an informed decision. In 2009, the NLD changed its stance and stated they welcome visitors "who are keen to promote the welfare of the common people". After the 2021 Myanmar coup against the democratically-elected government, Lonely Planet argued that tourists could still visit the country responsibly and not give support to the military dictatorship.

Lonely Planet popularity in the 21st century means a mention in a Lonely Planet guidebook is likely to inspire large numbers of travellers to that location. In 2010, for instance, Lonely Planet was blamed for the rise of what is sometimes referred to as the "Banana Pancake Trail" in Southeast Asia.

In March 2019, Lonely Planet posted a video on Facebook falsely claiming that the Banaue Rice Terraces in the Philippines were created by the Chinese, leading to criticism. The magazine later posted on Twitter in April 2019 that their Facebook video was indeed "misleading" and that they would update the next Philippines book edition but would not scrap current editions that already wrongfully state that the terraces were made by the Chinese.

== In popular culture ==
In April 2008, American writer Thomas Kohnstamm published the memoir Do Travel Writers Go to Hell? in which he described research shortcuts he employed while writing guidebooks for Lonely Planet. In a follow-up interview, he first claimed that in one case he had not even visited the country he wrote about but, subsequent to the ensuing publicity boost for his new book, Kohnstamm clarified that, in this particular edition, he had only been contracted to update the five-page history section and had never been expected to revisit the country for that small history section contract. After a review of Kohnstamm's guidebooks, Lonely Planet's then-publisher Piers Pickard stated that he had "failed to find any inaccuracies" in them.

In 2009, Australian author and former Lonely Planet guidebook writer Mic Looby published a fictional account of the guidebook writing business, titled Paradise Updated, in which the travel guide business was satirised.
