= The Arsonist (book) =

2018 book by Chloe Hooper

The Arsonist: A Mind on Fire
- Author: Chloe Hooper
- Subject: Black Saturday bushfires
- Genre: Non-fiction
- Publisher: Penguin Random House Australia
- Publication date: 2018-10-15
- Publication place: Australia
- Pages: 253
- Awards: 2019 Indie Book Award for Nonfiction
- ISBN: 9780670078189

The Arsonist: A Mind on Fire is a 2018 non-fiction book by Australian author Chloe Hooper. The book describes the investigation and prosecution of Brendan Sokaluk for arson following the 2009 Black Saturday bushfires. Sokaluk lit fires in the Gippsland region of Victoria on Black Saturday and was ultimately sentenced to 17 years and 9 months in prison for 10 counts of arson causing death. Black Saturday was described by then-Deputy Prime Minister Julia Gillard as "one of the darkest days in Australia’s peacetime history", with 173 people dying in as many as 400 separate fires. Hooper used court records and interviews to reconstruct that day's fires in Central Gippsland and the subsequent investigation and trial of Sokaluk.

The book was published by Penguin Random House in Australia in 2018 and by Seven Stories Press in the United States in 2020. It won the 2019 Indie Book Award for Nonfiction and was shortlisted for the Victorian Premier's Prize for Nonfiction and the Prime Minister's Literary Award for Nonfiction. The book received largely positive reviews from critics.

== Summary ==
The book is split into three sections: "The Detectives", "The Lawyers", and "The Courtroom". The first section, "The Detectives", details the events of 7 February 2009 and the subsequent investigation by the Arson Squad of the Victoria Police. Hooper follows the arson investigators as they use forensic techniques to ascertain the source of the fire and identify Sokaluk as a suspect. Sokaluk eventually admits that he lit the fires, but claims that he did so accidentally.

The second section, "The Lawyers", follows Sokaluk's community legal service lawyers as they build his defence. Hooper describes Sokaluk's background, including his diagnoses of autism and intellectual disability, and his struggles with social isolation. Hooper presents both the prosecution's framing of Sokaluk as a dangerous and cunning figure, and his defence lawyers' framing of him as a naive and vulnerable individual.

The final section, "The Courtroom", focuses on Sokaluk's trial. The prosecution places Sokaluk near the fire's origin and presents evidence of his unusual behaviour afterwards. Victims testify as to the impact of the fire on their lives. Sokaluk's defence, meanwhile, emphasises his intellectual disability and mental health issues. Ultimately, Sokaluk is convicted and sentenced to 17 years and 9 months in prison for 10 counts of arson causing death.

== Publication history ==
The Arsonist was first published in Australia by Penguin Random House on 15 October 2018. A paperback version of the book was released on 3 December 2019. The book was published in the United States by Seven Stories Press on 29 September 2020, and by Simon & Schuster in the United Kingdom on 9 July 2020. A Spanish translation by Jorge Rizzo Tortuero was published by RBA Libros on 12 March 2020 under the title Pirómano: Una mente en llamas.

== Reception ==
The Arsonist received positive reviews from critics. The judges of the 2019 Stella Prize describe it as "a profoundly sharp and inquisitive journey into the psyche of the person found responsible" for the fires.

Reviewers particularly praised the vividness of Hooper's writing. On behalf of The New York Times, Beejay Silcox wrote that the book had "propulsive energy" and that Hooper's "quiet dignity of witness...elevates The Arsonist from slick true-crime procedural to cultural time capsule". In Australian Book Review, Fiona Gruber wrote that by "bearing witness, it reminds us of the victims and the terror, the senselessness of a flame tossed onto a forest floor, and the awful silence of a landscape razed by fire". A review in The Saturday Paper praised Hooper's ability to ensure "the reader feels viscerally transported" into the settings of each of its three parts: the burnt bushland, the prison rooms, and finally the courtroom.

Several reviewers remarked on Hooper's construction of Sokaluk. Hooper was not able to interview Sokaluk, and instead reconstructs his character from court records and interviews. In the Sydney Review of Books, Jack Cameron Stanton wrote that by stringing together this series of impressions, "the idea of Sokaluk, Hooper’s simulation of the arsonist, has taken hold" in the minds of her readers. Beejay Silcox found that Cooper "renders him in silhouette", while Stanton describes his character as a "shadowy shapeshifter". In an interview published by the Chicago Review of Books, Hooper remarked on the contradictory impressions of Sokaluk as both naive and cunning that she gathered from investigators and defence lawyers, concluding that there is ultimately truth to both narratives. Reviewers praised the even-handedness of Hooper's portrayal of Sokaluk, with Robert Drewe writing in the Sydney Morning Herald that Hooper "arouses some compassion for Sokaluk – a bullied outsider who was only diagnosed with autism after his arrest...[but her] even-handed narrative pays full attention to the victims and the huge human distress the fires caused". Lee Polevoi, reviewing the book for Highbrow Magazine, praised "the author’s determination to see both sides of this tragic tale". Hooper was quoted by ABC News in 2018 as saying that "it's very difficult to say whether or not Brendan was a victim or a menace".

== Awards ==
Awards for The Arsonist
Year	Award	Result	Ref.
2019	Indie Book Award for Nonfiction	Winner	
2019	Prime Minister's Literary Award for Nonfiction	Shortlist	
2019	Stella Prize	Longlist	
2019	Victorian Premier's Prize for Nonfiction	Shortlist	
