= Louisa Lim =

Journalist

Louisa C. Lim
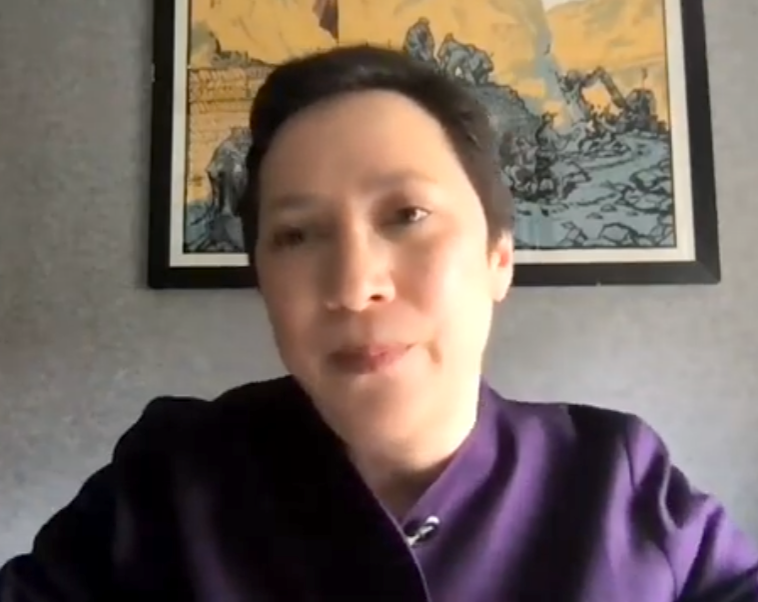
- In an online discussion in 2021
- Born: Hong Kong
- Other names: 林慕蓮
- Education: Monash University (PhD)
- Occupation: Journalist
- Website: www.louisalim.com

Louisa C. Lim is an Australian journalist and author. She is the co-host of The Little Red Podcast, an award-winning podcast covering China.

Lim holds a PhD in journalism from Monash University. Her thesis is titled In Search of the King of Kowloon: Hong Kong’s Identity Crisis and the Media Creation of an Icon. She is currently an Associate Professor at the University of Melbourne where she teaches audio journalism and podcasting.

Lim was born in London to an ethnic Chinese Singaporean father and a British mother. She worked as a foreign correspondent for the BBC and NPR in China for a decade, from 2003 to 2013. She has stated that her level of speaking Cantonese was "shamefully basic" but she identifies as a Hong Konger regardless.

The People's Republic of Amnesia was shortlisted for the Orwell Prize and the Helen Bernstein Book Award for Excellence in Journalism. Indelible City was shortlisted for the 2023 Victorian Premier's Literary Award for Nonfiction, the 2023 Stella Prize and the 2023 Nonfiction Book Award at the Queensland Literary Awards, and also for the Nonfiction Award at the 2023 Prime Minister's Literary Awards. It won the 2024 OpenBook award in Taiwan for a work in translation.

== Books ==
- The People's Republic of Amnesia: Tiananmen Revisited (Oxford University Press, 2014)
- Indelible City: Dispossession and Defiance in Hong Kong (Riverhead Books, 2022)
