= The People's Republic of Amnesia =

2014 nonfiction book by Louisa Lim

- First edition
- Author: Louisa Lim
- Language: English
- Genre: Non-fiction
- Publisher: Oxford University Press
- Publication date: 2014

The People's Republic of Amnesia: Tiananmen Revisited is a nonfiction book by journalist Louisa Lim and published by Oxford University Press in 2014. It explores the lives of people who were affected by the Tiananmen Square protests of 1989 and the June 4 Tiananmen Square massacre in China. Lim uses personal accounts to tell the story of the 1989 student protests and their aftermath.

== Overview ==
The book contains stories of (and interviews with) some of those affected by the 1989 student protests, reviewing the events from the perspectives of current and former military personnel, students, protesters and their relatives. Some of the best-known interviewees are Wu'erkaixi, one of the student leaders of the protests; Zhang Xianling, co-founder of Tiananmen Mothers, and Bao Tong, former policy secretary to the General Secretary of the Chinese Communist Party. Lim’s interest in writing the book arose from her curiosity "to discover how memories could be reformatted and how China’s population had become complicit in an act of mass amnesia."

== Synopsis ==
Chen Guang, a military photographer at the time of the 1989 student protests, tells of the events leading up to the aftermath. A Chinese soldier, he was tasked with capturing the crackdown. Lim uses soldiers' recollections to show the events from their perspective, including Chen's memory of the ground floor of the Great Hall of the People "turned into a makeshift hospital" and his conflicting feelings when he saw it.

Lim interviews Zhang Ming, a participant in the protests who spent seven years in jail afterwards. He describes his decision to participate, his contributions to the protest and the mindset of the protesters. After "organizing massive student marches and a boycott of classes", the decisions Zhang made during the protests would shape his life. Lim also focuses on the contributions of commercialism and economics to the amnesia surrounding the protests. She interviews Chen Ziming, an intellectual sentenced to 13 years' imprisonment as "one of the black hands behind the student movement". According to Chen, a number of student leaders have benefited from compromise and fear political interference in their businesses: "They won’t even admit to being student leaders".

Lim encounters Wu'er Kaixi, who provides insight into the mind of a protest leader and recalls his involvement in events such as the hunger strike. He says that the hunger strike was his idea, a "deliberate strategy to escalate the movement". Wu'er describes his struggles, ideas and life since his exile from China, his feelings towards those who remained behind and were imprisoned, and appeals to China’s leaders to be allowed to return to his motherland.

The author explores the amnesia and censorship which the Chinese government has instilled into its young people, and how it has affected their knowledge of the Tiananmen Square events. Feel Liu, age 22, tells Lim about what he was taught in school about the protests; from a teacher’s perspective, the subject was "best left untouched". Lim shows young people a photo of Tank Man and asks them if they have ever heard of him.

She writes about Zhang Xianling, mother of student protester Wang Nan (who was killed during the June 4th massacre). Her attempts to cope with the death of her son and learn the truth behind the deaths of many other students led to the creation of the Tiananmen Mothers, a group of relatives of those who were killed on June 4, 1989. Tiananmen Mothers seeks justice and shed light on the circumstances around their children's deaths. Zhang recalls the days before the massacre and the events leading to her son’s death.

Lim explores the concept of patriotic education, interviewing party members about the protests, life after it and the desire to move past it. This includes China’s attempt at "ideological re-education", one of the largest such attempts in modern history. Textbooks were rewritten to "change the prism through which the past and present were viewed".

Bao Tong, former secretary to Communist Party general secretary Zhao Ziyang, talks about the decisions which led to the crackdown from the perspective of political leaders such as Deng Xiaoping and Zhao Ziyang. Lim describes Tong's life after his release from prison; he is not yet fully free, since he is closely monitored by the government. Tong, however, is relatively unconcerned; this has become his normal life: "I'm totally used to it, if they’re not with me, I feel lost".

Lim paints a portrait of Chengdu, a city in southwest China, after the protests with "memories, declassified U.S. diplomatic cables, diaries, hastily written reports of the time, contemporaneous photographs, and Chinese government-approved accounts". Interviews present the crackdown in Chengdu on protesters of the June 4th massacre in Tiananmen Square. Dennis Rae describes mourning wreaths and signs carried around the city, its "panicked urgency" and the injured people in the local hospital.

== Reception ==
The People’s Republic of Amnesia: Tiananmen Revisited has been reviewed several times. Jonathan Mirsky of The New York Times wrote, "Lim's accounts of the amnesia of many Chinese, make [her book] one of the best analyses of the impact of Tiananmen throughout China in the years since 1989".

According to Jennifer Altehenger of King's College London, "The book is accessible, fluidly written and offers rich accounts of one of the most complex chapters in contemporary Chinese history", but Lim's citations are "unnecessarily complicated". Jeremy Brown of Simon Fraser University wrote, "The story of Chengdu does not fit in Lim's overall structure ... but it is the book's most original contribution".

The Guardian's reviewer said that: "Lim's important book offers a chilling vision of an Orwellian society", while The Independent's reviewer called it "an impressive work of investigative history".

The Economist listed the book as one of its "Books of the year" for 2014.

== See also ==
- Indelible City - Lim's other book
