= Witness (Milligan book) =

2020 book by Louise Milligan

- Author: Louise Milligan
- Genre: Non-Fiction
- Publisher: Hachette Australia
- Publication date: 27 October 2020
- Publication place: Australia
- Pages: 384
- ISBN: 9780733644634

Witness is a 2020 non-fiction book by investigative journalist Louise Milligan. The book explores the ways in which victims of crime, particularly victims of sexual assault and child sexual abuse, are mistreated by the legal system when appearing as witnesses in court. The book was inspired by Milligan's own experience testifying in the trial of George Pell, an Australian cardinal accused of sexual abuse. Milligan later said in interviews that being cross-examined in Pell's trial was like being "hit by a truck" and that Pell's lawyer Robert Richter had consistently addressed her in a "sneering, sarcastic, bullying" tone. The book was shortlisted for the 2021 Stella Prize and the 2021 Victorian Premier's Literary Award for Non-Fiction.

== Reception ==
Witness received positive reviews. A review in The Conversation labelled the book an "excoriating critique of the failures of the criminal justice system" and "a triumph of intellect and empathy". In the Sydney Morning Herald, a reviewer called the book "lucid, scathing and, often, exceptionally moving". In The Saturday Paper, legal academic Kieran Pender praised Milligan's ability to balance a structural critique of the criminal justice system with moving stories of individuals' experiences. Beejax Silcox gave a positive review of the book in Australian Book Review, writing that Milligan's recounting of her cross-examination made for "riveting, rage-making reading".

== Awards ==
Awards for Witness
Year	Award	Category	Result	Ref.
2021	Stella Prize	—	Shortlisted	
2021	Colin Roderick Award	—	Shortlisted	
2021	Victorian Premier's Literary Awards	Victorian Premier's Prize for Nonfiction	Shortlisted	
2021	Victorian Premier's Literary Awards	People's Choice Award	Won	
