= Maureen Wheeler =

Northern Irish-Australian publishing entrepreneur

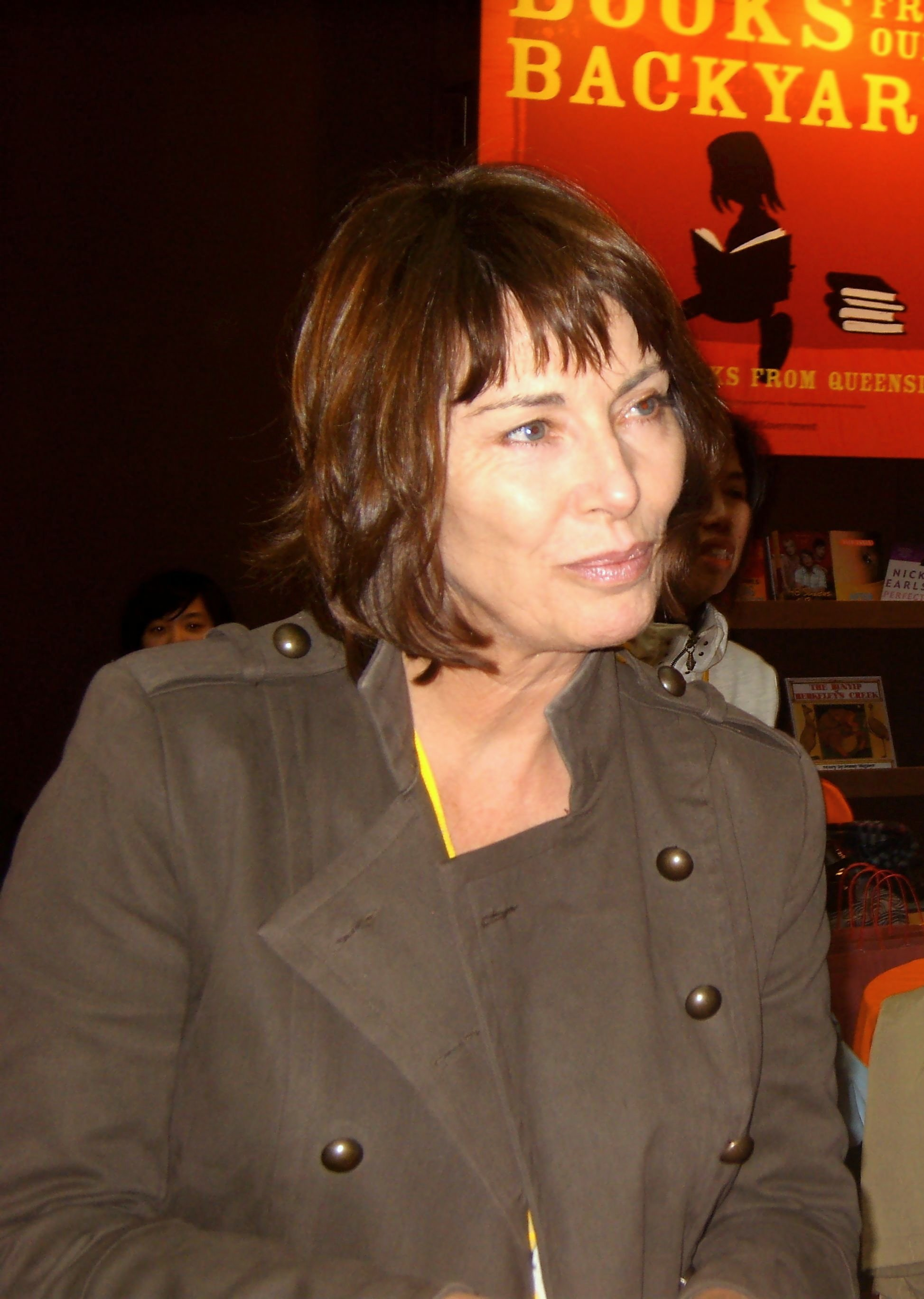
Maureen Wheeler in 2008

Maureen Wheeler AO is a Northern Irish and Australian businesswoman, who co-founded the travel publisher Lonely Planet with her husband, Tony Wheeler.

== Personal life ==
Maureen Wheeler was born in Belfast, Northern Ireland, and moved to London at the age 20, where she met her future husband, Tony. They travelled from London through Europe and Asia, then on to Australia. That trip resulted in a guidebook Across Asia on the Cheap and laid the foundations of Lonely Planet.

== Lonely Planet ==
The Wheelers wrote their second book South-East Asia on a Shoestring. Tony Wheeler says: "Although we've continually refined the information organisation, and in 2004 pushed through a complete reorganisation and redesign, the pattern we established with that first serious book has remained remarkably consistent to the present day."

Australia became their permanent home during the 1970s, but Maureen was convinced that they could never support themselves through Lonely Planet and began study at La Trobe University in February 1976 and completed a Bachelor of Social Work in 1980. Afterward, she committed herself full-time to developing the business.

Wheeler says in 1979, "We moved into an office rather than working from our house, we took on a partner (Jim Hart), and we took on the India book which resulted in the biggest book on India that was ever seen. Up until then, there were three of us – all the books were stored in this little tin shed out the back and under the beds and everywhere else. It was a very amateur, home grown business." In 1981, with a staff of ten, Lonely Planet India was published, becoming an immediate best-seller.

After giving birth to her two children, the numerous questions Wheeler received by parents wondering if travel had to be postponed until the children were older, prompted her to write a guidebook. Her years of experience on the road with her children allowed her to write Travel With Children to give advice on how to make travel as stress-free as possible.

Over the next few decades Lonely Planet became a major publishing house, with offices in Melbourne, London and Oakland, over 500 staff members and 300 authors. The company sells six million books each year, 90 per cent overseas. Lonely Planet has printed more than 54 million copies of its 600 guides in 17 languages and has $85 million annual turnover.

Wheeler organised two Lonely Planet travel summits in 1994 and 1997.

Wheeler has been the driving force behind Lonely Planet's corporate contributions programme established to provide financial assistance for humanitarian projects in developing countries. The next step of her philanthropy is in creating the Planet Wheeler Foundation by funding it with money from the sale of Lonely Planet to the BBC.

== Awards ==
- 1999 – Australian Business Women's Network award for the most Inspiring Business Woman for the year.
- 2001 – Honorary Doctorate awarded by University of Ulster, Northern Ireland
- 2002 – Lloyd O'Neil Award for Services to the Australian Book Industry awarded jointly to Tony Wheeler and Maureen Wheeler.
- 2005 – American University's School of Communication (SOC) and the Society of American Travel Writers Foundation inaugural Eric A. Friedheim Travel Journalism Lifetime Achievement Award.
- 2014 – Awarded an Order of Australia (AO) with her husband in 2014.

== Positions held ==
- 2000 to 2006 – Director on the Board of Tourism Tasmania, serving two terms.
- 2005 – Adjunct Professor in the Department of Sport, Tourism and Hospitality Management in the Faculty of Law and Management at La Trobe University.
- 2006 – Director on the Board of NT Tourism.
- 2008 – Advisory Board of Australian Aid International.
- 2014 – Director on the Board of Melbourne Theatre Company.

== See also ==
- Irish Australian
- Wheeler Centre
