= The Tall Man: Death and Life on Palm Island =

2008 book by Chloe Hooper

- First edition
- Author: Chloe Hooper
- Language: English
- Subject: Non-fiction
- Published: 2008 (Hamish Hamilton)
- Publication place: Australia
- Media type: Print (Hardback)
- Pages: 276
- Awards: Davitt Award
- ISBN: 9780241015377
- OCLC: 247035554

The Tall Man: Death and Life on Palm Island is a 2008 book by Chloe Hooper. It is about the events surrounding the death in custody of Aboriginal Australian man, Cameron Doomadgee. It won numerous awards and was shortlisted for many others in 2009.

== Publication history ==
- 2006, The Tall Man: Inside Palm Island's heart of darkness appearing in The Monthly, pages 34–53, Australia, March 2006, Schwartz Publishing ISSN 1832-3421
- 2008, The Tall Man: Death and Life on Palm Island (277 pages), Australia, Hamish Hamilton ISBN 9780241015377, hardcover
- 2009, Tall Man: The Death of Doomadgee (258 pages), USA, Scribner ISBN 9781416561590, hardback

== Reception ==
The New York Times reviewing The Tall Man wrote "Hooper travels to remote settlements and reaches into prehistory in her effort to penetrate this fractured story, learning of song lines, of Hairy Man and Tall Man spirits (Hurley, at 6-foot-7, evokes the latter). And though there is no resolution, she makes of it all an extraordinary whole. “I had wanted to know more about my country,” she says at the end of the book, “and now I did — now I knew more than I wanted to.”"

The Guardian noted "The Tall Man has already drawn comparisons with some of the best of that often derided genre, true crime, and it fully deserves the attention. Like Truman Capote's In Cold Blood and, more recently, Francisco Goldman's The Art of Political Murder, this gracefully nuanced book is as much about the world in which a death takes place as the nature of the death itself." and The Sydney Morning Herald found it "a thoughtful, perceptive examination of an important Australian tragedy."

The Tall Man has also been reviewed by The Daily Telegraph, the Indigenous Law Bulletin, The Globe and Mail, the Australian Book Review and Kirkus Reviews.

== Awards ==
- Winner 2006 Walkley Award. for her articles in The Monthly on the death in custody of Cameron Doomadgee on Palm Island.
- Winner 2008 Western Australian Premier Non-Fiction Book Award
- Winner 2008 Western Australian Premier's Prize Book Award
- Winner 2009 New South Wales Premier's Literary Awards.Douglas Stewart Prize for Non-Fiction
- Winner 2009 Victorian Premier's Literary Award Nettie Palmer Prize for Australian Nonfiction
- Winner 2009 Ned Kelly Award for Best True Crime
- Winner 2009 Queensland Premier's Literary Non-Fiction Book Award
- Winner 2009 Australian Book Industry Awards for General Non-fiction
- Winner 2009 John Button Prize for Writing for Young Adults
- Winner 2009 Indie Award for Non-fiction
- Winner 2009 Davitt Awards for Best True Crime
- Shortlisted 2008 Human Rights Award for Non-fiction
- Shortlisted 2008 Walkley Award for Non-fiction
- Shortlisted 2009 Australian Book Industry Awards for Book of the Year
- Shortlisted 2009 Queensland Premier's Award for Advancing Public Debate
- Shortlisted 2009 Gleebooks Prize for Critical Writing, NSW Premier's Literary Awards
- Shortlisted 2009 Prime Minister's Literary Award for Non-fiction
- Finalist 2009 Melbourne Prize For Literature: Best Writing Award - finalist
