= Chloe Hooper =

Australian author

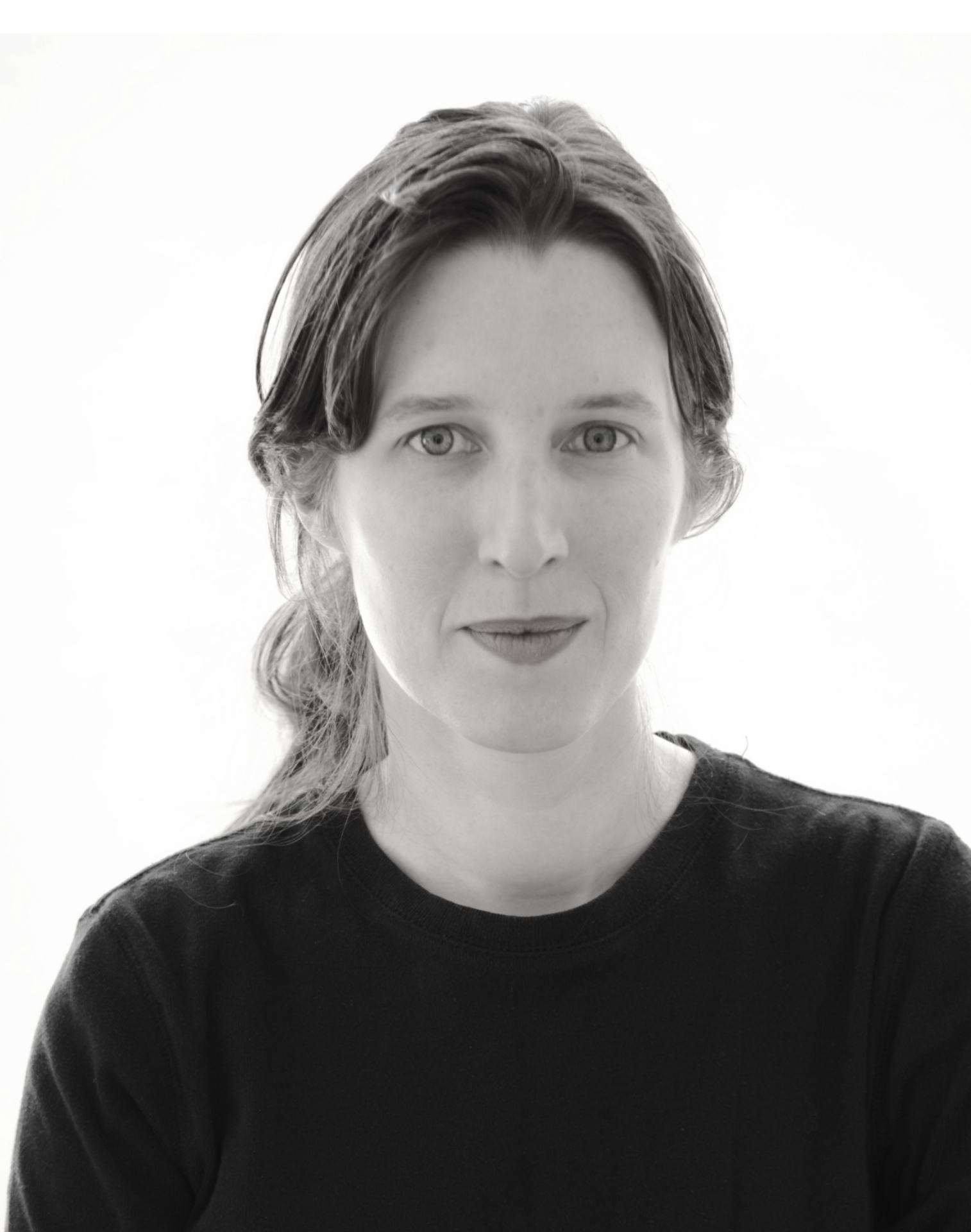
- Born: Melbourne, Victoria, Australia
- Education: Lauriston Girls' School
- Alma mater: University of Melbourne; Columbia University
- Occupations: Novelist, journalist
- Writing career
- Language: English
- Years active: 2002–present

Chloe Hooper is an Australian author. She is known for her 2008 non-fiction work, The Tall Man: Death and Life on Palm Island

== Early life and education ==
Chloe Hooper was born in Melbourne, Victoria.

She attended Lauriston Girls' School, and then the University of Melbourne and Columbia University.

== Career ==
Hooper's first novel, A Child's Book of True Crime (2002), was short-listed for the Orange Prize for Literature and was a New York Times Notable Book.

In 2005, she turned to reportage and the next year won a Walkley Award for her writing on the 2004 Palm Island death in custody case. The Tall Man: Death and Life on Palm Island (2008) is a non-fiction account of the same case.

Her 2018 book, The Arsonist: A Mind on Fire, published in the United States by Seven Stories Press in 2020, investigates the Black Saturday bushfires, one of the most devastating wildfires in Australian history.

== Awards and recognition ==
Hooper was a recipient of a Sidney Myer Creative Fellowship, an award of A$160,000 given to mid-career creatives and thought leaders.

- Shortlisted 2002 Orange Prize. for (A Child's Book of True Crime)
- Winner 2006 Walkley Award. for her articles in The Monthly on the death in custody of Cameron Doomadgee on Palm Island.
- Winner 2008 Western Australian Premier's Book Awards, Award for Non-Fiction category, for The Tall Man
- Winner 2008 Western Australian Premier's Book Awards for Book of the Year, for The Tall Man
- Winner 2009 New South Wales Premier's Literary Awards. Won the Douglas Stewart Prize for Non-fiction for The Tall Man
- Winner 2009 Victorian Premier's Literary Award Nettie Palmer Prize for Non-fiction for The Tall Man
- Winner 2009 Australian Book Industry Awards for General Non-fiction for The Tall Man
- Winner 2009 John Button Prize for Writing for Young Adults for The Tall Man
- Winner 2009 Queensland Premier's Literary Non-Fiction Book Award for The Tall Man
- Winner 2009 Indie Award for Non-fiction for The Tall Man
- Winner 2009 Ned Kelly Awards for Best True Crime for The Tall Man
- Winner 2009 Davitt Awards for Best True Crime for The Tall Man
- Shortlisted, 2008 Human Rights Award for Non-fiction for The Tall Man
- Shortlisted, 2008 Walkley Award for Non-fiction for The Tall Man
- Shortlisted, 2009 Australian Book Industry Awards for Book of the Year for The Tall Man
- Shortlisted, 2009 Queensland Premier's Award for Advancing Public Debate for The Tall Man
- Shortlisted, 2009 Gleebooks Prize for Critical Writing at the NSW Premier's Literary Awards, for The Tall Man
- Shortlisted, 2009 Prime Minister's Literary Award for Non-fiction for The Tall Man
- Shortlisted, 2019 Victorian Premier's Prize for Nonfiction for The Arsonist
- Longlisted, 2019 Stella Prize
- Shortlisted 2023 National Biography Award for Bedtime Story
- Winner, 2026 Australian Book Industry Awards General Nonfiction Book of the Year for The Mushroom Tapes (shared with co-authors Helen Garner and Sarah Krasnostein)
- Shortlisted, 2026 Indie Book Awards Book of the Year – Non-Fiction

== Books ==
- A Child's Book of True Crime (2002)
- The Tall Man: Death and Life on Palm Island (2008) (released as Tall Man: The Death of Doomadgee in the USA)
- The Engagement (2012)
- The Arsonist: A Mind on Fire (2018)
- Bedtime Story (2022)
- The Mushroom Tapes (2025; with Helen Garner and Sarah Krasnostein)
