= Donna Merwick =

Australian historian (1932–2021)

Donna Jeanne Merwick (February 14, 1932 Chicago – August 22, 2021 Melbourne) was a historian who was Senior Fellow in the Department of History at the University of Melbourne, Long Term Visiting Fellow at Australian National University, and Adjunct Associate Professor in the Swinburne Institute for Social Research at the Swinburne University of Technology.

== Early life ==
After studying history at Mundelein College, Merwick entered the Order of the Sisters of Charity of the Blessed Virgin Mary. In 1962 she earned a MA from DePaul University and a Ph.D. from the University of Wisconsin–Madison. She began teaching at Mundelein in 1966, left the Order in 1968 and began teaching at the University of Melbourne in 1971 (she retired in 1995).

== Personal life ==
Merwick married Australian historian Greg Dening in 1971.

== Publications ==
- Boston priests, 1848-1910: a study of social and intellectual change 1973
- Possessing Albany, 1630-1710: the Dutch and English experiences 1990
- Death of a notary: conquest and change in colonial New York 1999
- The shame and the sorrow: Dutch-Amerindian encounters in New Netherland 2006
- Stuyvesant Bound: An Essay on Loss Across Time 2013

=== Journal articles ===
- Geertz, Clifford, 'History and Anthropology', New Literary History, vol. 21, 1990, pp. 325–335.
- Hoffer, Peter, 'Review of Death of a notary', The Journal of American History, vol. 87, no. 4, 2001, pp. 1465–6.
- Kroen, Sheryl, 'Review of Death of a notary', Rethinking History, vol. 4, no. 2, 2000, pp. 228–230.
