= Melbourne City of Literature =

Melbourne City of Literature is a City of Literature located in Victoria, Australia, as part of the UNESCO Creative Cities Network. It was designated by UNESCO in 2008 as the second City of Literature, after Edinburgh and the first Australian City of Literature.

The Melbourne City of Literature Office is funded by Creative Victoria and the City of Melbourne. In 2017, the Office was awarded a "gold star assessment" from the UN.

In 2014, the Melbourne City of Literature Office was established, directed by David Ryding. The Office is hosted at the Wheeler Centre and is dedicated to supporting Melbourne as a City of Literature through one-off programs and projects, partnerships with the literary sector, and international exchanges with other UNESCO Cities of Literature.

In 2022, Melbourne City of Literature hosted the UNESCO Cities of Literature annual meeting for the first time, with representatives from 26 of the 42 Cities of Literature around the world attending in person. During the Melbourne annual meeting, literary delegates engaged in discussions, roundtable events and connected with literary organisations such as The Wheeler Centre, Australian Poetry, State Library Victoria, Emerging Writers Festival, Express Media and 100 Story Building.

== Projects ==
- City of Literature Parliament 2008
- Travel Fund 2014
- Conference Subsidy Program 2016
- Known Bookshops 2017
- Sleipnir's Literary Travels 2017
- Public Artwork Design Concept Award 2017
- Art Book Fair (in association with the National Gallery of Victoria to assist the attendance of international book publishers)
- Walking the city of literature : a literary map of Melbourne
- Poet Laureates of Melbourne 2020
- Bookshops of the Cities of Literature
- The Stories We Tell Ourselves 2021
- International Literary Programmers' Roundtable
- Tramlines 2023
