= 2012 Bangkok bombings =

Explosions in Bangkok, Thailand

- Part of Iran–Israel proxy conflict
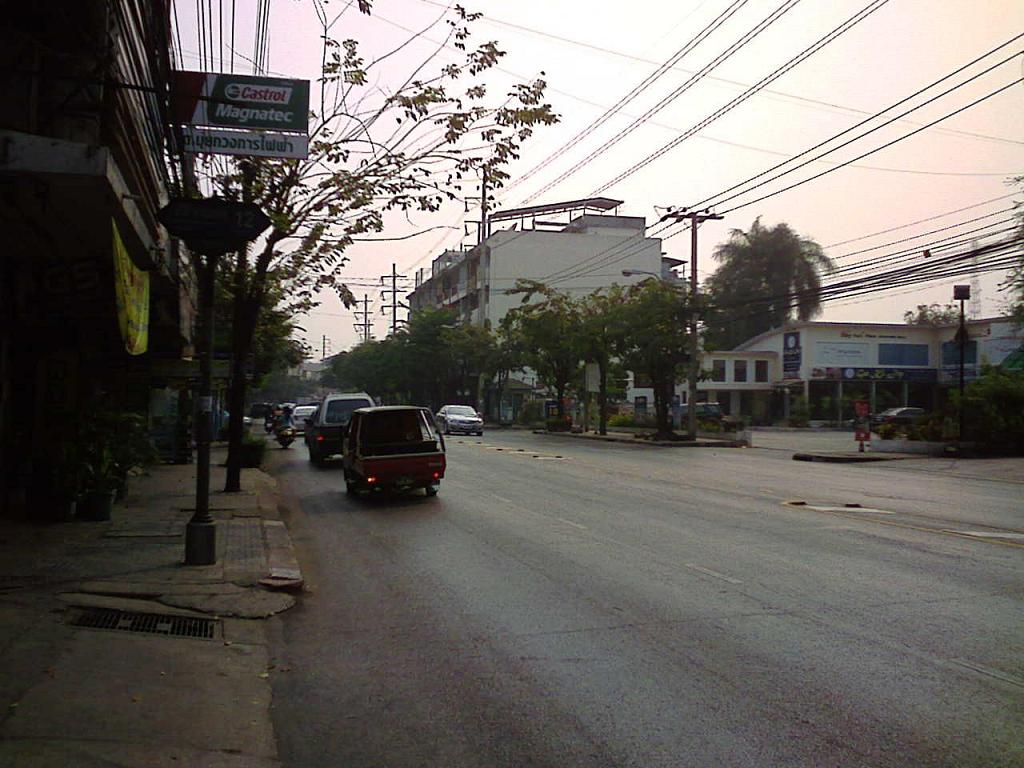
- Sukhumvit 71 (Pridi Banomyong) Road, nearby the site of explosion
- Location: Watthana, Bangkok, Thailand
- Date: 14 February 2012; 14:00 (UTC+7)
- Target: Israeli Embassy, Bangkok
- Attack type: Conspiracy
- Injuries: 5
- Perpetrators: Saeed Moradi (incarcerated); Mohammad Hazaei (incarcerated); Masoud Sedaghat Zadeh (in custody); Leila Rohani (now at large); Javad Nikkahfard (now at large); Ali Akbar Norouzi Shaya (now at large)

The 2012 Bangkok bombings were a series of explosions that occurred in Bangkok, Thailand on 14 February 2012, injuring five people. Israeli authorities said that the bombings were a botched attempt by Iranian nationals to assassinate Israeli diplomats. Several Iranians were arrested and charged for the attacks, one of whom was badly injured.

== Background ==
The blasts occurred a day after attacks on Israeli diplomats in Tbilisi, Georgia and New Delhi, India. Israel said that the Iranian government was behind the bombings. However, Iran has stated that Israel carried out the attacks in order to damage Tehran's good relations with India, Georgia, and Thailand. Thailand had recently recognized the statehood of Palestine.

== Explosions ==
The first blast happened at about 14:00 at a safe house on Sukhumvit 71, which the suspects had rented. The explosion blew off part of the roof of the structure. The men then fled the house. Moradi, who was injured and bloodied, attempted to flag down a taxi. When the driver, seeing his state, refused to take him, he threw a grenade at the taxi. The grenade damaged the vehicle and injured the driver. Police officers who responded to the blasts then tried to stop Moradi, who tried to escape by throwing another grenade at them. The grenade bounced off a tree and back at him, exploding and severing both his legs.

== Investigation ==
The investigation involved Thai police officials and forensic experts who collected samples and fragments from the blast sites; a forensic report on the type of explosives used, submitted to police within days; and CCTV footage of the suspects.

Three of the Iranians charged with the bombings, Moradi, Khazaei and Zadeh, flew into Phuket in southern Thailand on 8 February. They then traveled to Pattaya, where they were a tabloid magazine alleges they spent five nights in the company of three female prostitutes, before heading to Bangkok.

Police Forensic Unit Commander Peerapong Damapong described the bombs used as "one of those transistor radios that you can carry around, but the insides have been taken out and replaced with C-4, with the head of the bomb consisting of a bolt, a pin and a detonator attached to it... From what we've seen, it's possible for the components to be bought in Thailand. The explosive isn't that complicated, it's just something that we haven't really seen in this country."

A Thai official said on 17 February that the investigation had not discovered a link between the suspects and any group and that the bombings were probably not an attempt to kill Israeli Defense Minister Ehud Barak, who was scheduled to visit the country.

=== Suspects ===
- Iranian nationals:
- Saeed Moradi (28, male): lost both his legs when a grenade he threw at pursuing police officers bounced off a tree and back at him; brought to Chulalongkorn Hospital in serious condition.
- Mohammad Hazaei (42, male): arrested at Suvarnabhumi Airport near Bangkok after the bombings.
- Masoud Sedaghat Zadeh (31, male): fled to Malaysia on the day of the bombings; arrested by the Royal Malaysian Police in Kuala Lumpur International Airport on 15 February, while attempting to travel to Iran.
- Leila Rohani (female): thought to have fled to Tehran; rented the house where the three previous suspects stayed.
- Javad Nikkahfard (52, male): caught on security cameras going in and out of the rented house; thought to be the bomb specialist in the group; arrest warrant issued.
- Ali Akbar Norouzi Shaya (57, male): arrest warrant issued for possessing and making explosives; thought to have escaped to Iran.

On 22 August 2013, Saeid Moradi was sentenced to life imprisonment while Mohammad Hazaei was sentenced to 15 years imprisonment and deportation.

In November 2020, during a "prisoner swap", Saeed Moradi, Mohammad Hazaei and Masoud Sedaghat Zadeh were exchanged for Kylie Moore-Gilbert. Moore-Gilbert was a university lecturer held in Iran for 2 years.

== Reactions ==
Chief of Royal Thai Police Priewpan Damapong instructed the Transportation Ministry to place the country's six international airports on high alert. The directive was said to follow reports provided by Israeli intelligence that further attacks on Thai soil were possible.

Thai police carried out building-to-building searches around a Jewish synagogue on Sukhumvit Road. The synagogue was already under 24-hour police protection following the arrest in January of a Swedish-Lebanese alleged Hezbollah agent.

The Counter-Terrorism Bureau of the Israeli National Security Council issued a worldwide travel warning, based on information that Iran and Hezbollah were planning additional attacks against Israelis and Jews.

== See also ==
- List of Islamist terrorist attacks
- List of attacks against Israeli embassies and diplomats
