= Tony Wheeler =

English-Australian publishing entrepreneur (born 1946)

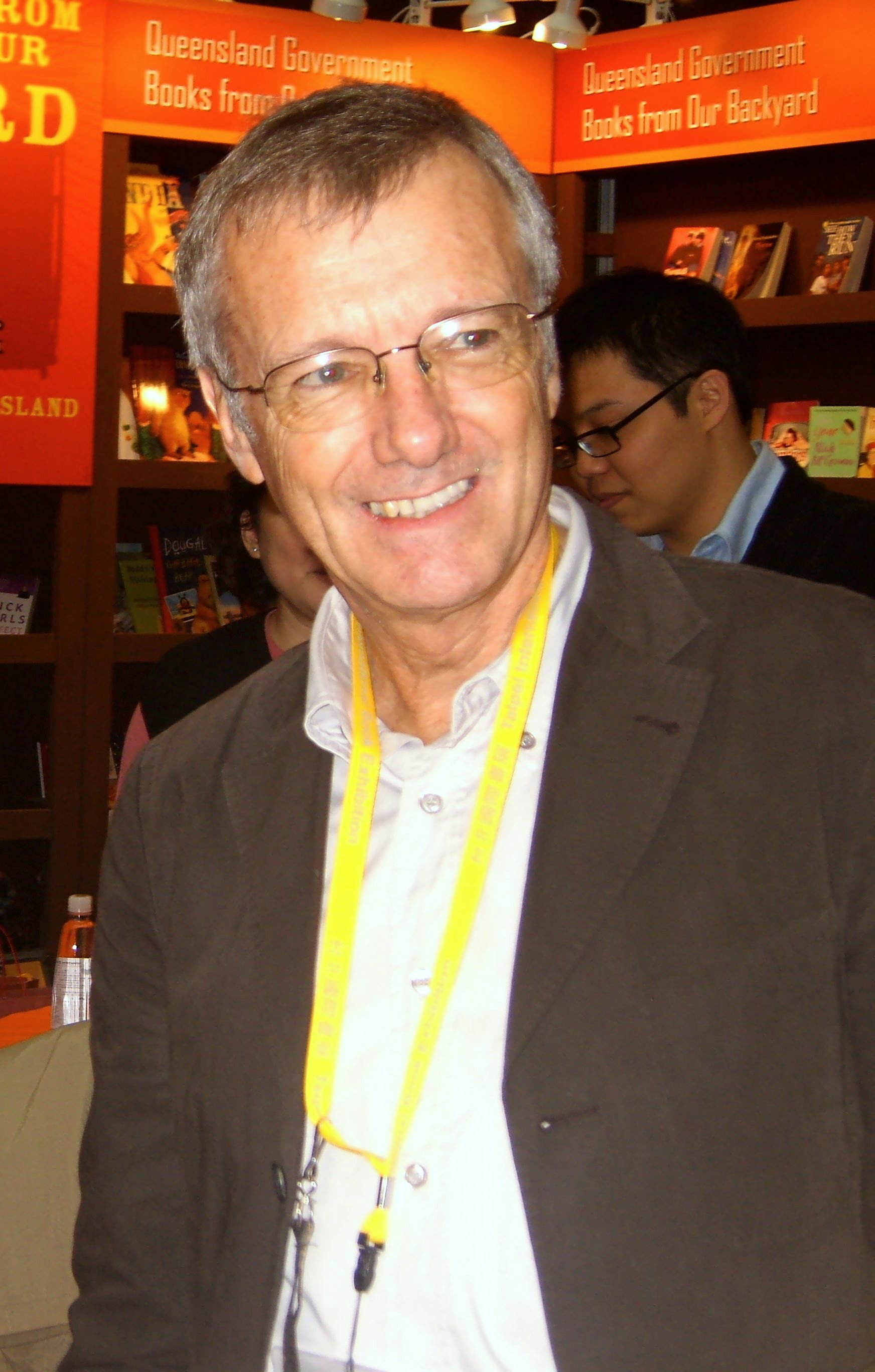
Tony Wheeler

Tony Wheeler AO (born 20 December 1946) is an English-born Australian publishing entrepreneur, businessman and travel writer, co-founder of the Lonely Planet guidebook company with his wife, Maureen Wheeler.

Wheeler was born in England. His father worked for the British Overseas Airways Corporation as an airport manager, so he grew up in Pakistan, the Bahamas, Canada, the United States and England, never spending as much as two years in the same school.

Wheeler holds an engineering degree from Warwick University and an MBA from London Business School. He was an engineer at the Chrysler corporation.

After travelling across Europe with Maureen Wheeler, they arrived in Melbourne in 1972 and put out their first book, Across Asia on the Cheap in 1973. This would grow into the Lonely Planet empire, a name derived from a misheard Joe Cocker song (the lyric was, in fact, "lovely planet"). They married and had two children, Tashi and Kieran.

In 1980, the publication of a guidebook to India effectively doubled the size of the company.

BBC Worldwide bought 75 percent of their share of the company in 2007 and their remaining 25 percent in February 2011, bringing the couple's net worth to $190 million.

His books since Lonely Planet include Bad Lands and Unlikely Destinations.

In the 2014 Queen's Birthday Honours List, Tony and Maureen Wheeler were both appointed as Officers of the Order of Australia (AO), each for "distinguished service to business and commerce as a publisher of travel guides, and as a benefactor to a range of Australian arts and aid organisations". When interviewed on ABC TV One Plus One on 20 June 2019 Wheeler said he has a home in England and Melbourne.

== See also ==
- Wheeler Centre
