= Thomas Kohnstamm =

American writer

- Born: November 24, 1975 (age 50); Seattle, Washington, United States
- Occupations: Writer, video producer
- Writing career
- Genres: Non-fiction, fiction
- Notable work: Do Travel Writers Go to Hell? Lake City

Thomas Kohnstamm (born November 24, 1975) is an American author from Seattle, Washington.

== Fiction ==
Kohnstamm announced in late 2023 that his next novel, Supersonic, will publish in early 2025. His first novel Lake City was published by Counterpoint Press in January 2019. The dark comedy was called “a caustic satire on class privilege and deprivation” by The Seattle Times and “hip, intrepid, and philosophical” by Publishers Weekly.

== Non-fiction ==
Kohnstamm's book Do Travel Writers Go to Hell?, a gonzo style memoir was published by Random House/Three Rivers Press in April 2008. The author drew criticism, and according to the author, death threats, after he said in publicizing the book that he had performed a "desk update" of a guidebook - before later clarifying that he had only been commissioned to write the front-of-book (introduction, history, culture, etc) chapters and oversee the other writers. He also called into question both the accuracy and the practices of his fellow travel guide writers.

Lonely Planet's publisher Piers Pickard defended their rate of pay, and the accuracy of their work. Other guidebook writers defended some of Kohnstamm's claims, contrasting with those of Pickard who had first claimed "no freebies — period", before then admitting freebies could be taken under some circumstances.

The book received positive reviews. The New York Times observed "were I his editor, I’d want his blood", but also admitted "As a reader...I could not get enough of the most depraved travel book of the year". Another review praised Kohnstamm's "spirited prose".
