= Do Travel Writers Go to Hell? =

Book by Thomas Kohnstamm

- Author: Thomas Kohnstamm
- Genre: Memoir
- Publisher: Three Rivers Press
- Publication date: 2008

Do Travel Writers Go to Hell? is a memoir and gonzo travelogue written by Thomas Kohnstamm and published by Three Rivers Press in 2008.

Kohnstamm claimed in an interview (not related to the book) to have written the front section material of a Lonely Planet guide to Colombia without having made a specific research trip for that project. This led to the publisher carrying out an urgent review of the content which did not reveal any inaccuracies. In his book, Kohnstamm said he was given only 60 days to cover a 1000 mile stretch of northern Brazil for the 2005 Lonely Planet guide to the country. Insufficient time and money to do the job led him to compile information from secondary sources which he described as a "mosaic job." He insinuated that this was common practice in the industry. Kohnstamm later clarified that, in this particular edition, he had only been contracted to update the five-page history section and had never been expected to revisit the country for that small history section contract.

The book was met with a global media coverage prior to its release and positive reviews when it hit the shelves in April 2008.

A book review in The New York Times calls "this rollicking exposé of the travel book industry...the most depraved travel book of the year". The book was also criticised by Robert Hauptman who said that the author "did many distasteful things", described one incident related in the text as "nauseating" and considered his attitude to be cynical. There was some controversy when the book was released.
