= Wheeler Centre =

Australian literary, publishing centre founded 2010

Coordinates: 37.809801°S 144.964787°E

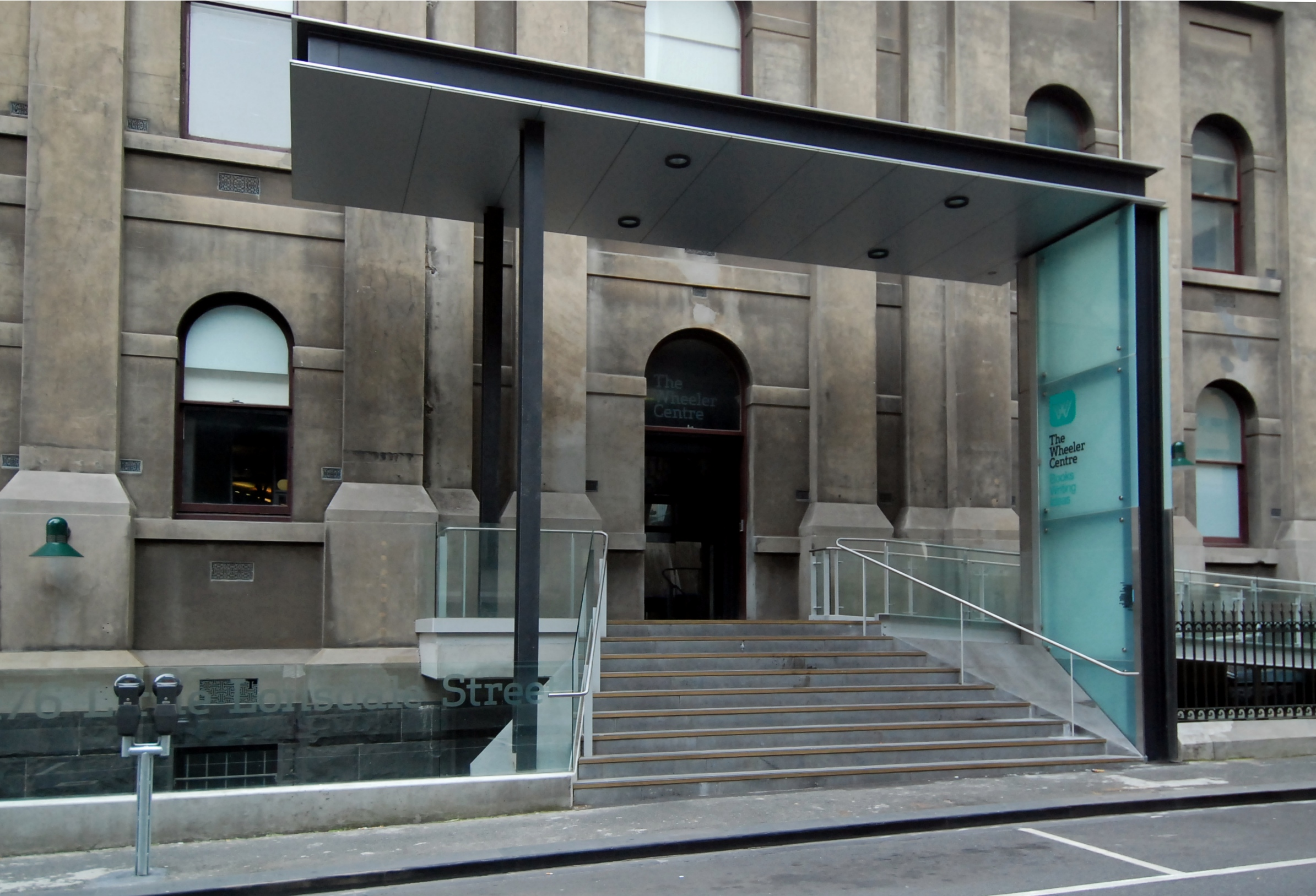
- Established: 2010
- Chair: Kate Torney OAM
- CEO: Erin Vincent
- Address: 176 Little Lonsdale Street Melbourne 3000
- Location: Melbourne, Victoria, Australia
- Website: https://www.wheelercentre.com/

The Wheeler Centre, originally Centre of Books, Writing and Ideas, is a literary and publishing centre founded as part of Melbourne's bid to be a Unesco Creative City of Literature, which designation it earned in 2008. It is named after its patrons, Tony and Maureen Wheeler, founders of the Lonely Planet travel guides.

Opened in 2010, the centre is housed in the southern wing of the State Library of Victoria. As well as programming literary events, debates and awards, the centre hosts literary organisations including Express Media, the Melbourne Writers Festival, the Melbourne City of Literature Office, Australian Poetry, the Emerging Writers' Festival, the Small Press Network and Writers Victoria.

== Staff and board ==
In October 2008 the centre's board of directors was appointed including Eric Beecher (chair), Peter Biggs, Joanna Murray-Smith, Readings owner Mark Rubbo, Gabrielle Coyne and Andrew Hagger. In February 2009, Chrissy Sharp became the centre's inaugural director. In April 2009, Michael Williams was appointed head of programming. When Sharp left in 2011, Williams became director of the organisation. Williams left the organisation in March 2020. Caro Llewellyn was appointed CEO in July 2020 and stepped down in July 2023. Former media executive Erin Vincent is the current CEO. The centre's board of directors are Kate Torney OAM (chair), Marcus Fazio, John Gibbins, Julie Ligeti, Julie Pinkham, Jamila Rizvi, Jock Serong and Chaman Sidhu.

== History ==
In 2008, Melbourne was designated a UNESCO City of Literature, which heralded the establishment of the Centre of Books, Writing and Ideas by the Victorian state government. On 26 November that year the centre was named The Wheeler Centre after a substantial donation by the founders of Lonely Planet travel guides, Tony and Maureen Wheeler.

The Wheeler Centre officially opened on 12 February 2010 with a gala night of storytelling featuring several of Australia's most significant writers and performers, including Paul Kelly, David Malouf, Cate Kennedy, John Safran and Shane Maloney.

Speakers at the Centre have included Helen Garner, Alexis Wright, Tony Birch, Julia Gillard, Paul Kelly, Melissa Lucashenko, Andy Griffiths, Christos Tsiolkas, Paul Keating, Kon Karapanagiotidis, Clementine Ford, Richard Flanagan, Bruce Pascoe, Bill Shorten, Liane Moriarty, Jack Charles, John Clarke, Stella Young, George R. R. Martin, Hanya Yanagihara, Eleanor Catton, Fran Lebowitz, Ira Glass, Jenna Wortham, Mona Eltahawy, Art Spiegelman, Roxane Gay, Yotam Ottolenghi, Masha Gessen, Jeanette Winterson, Alison Bechdel, Hisham Matar, Fatima Bhutto, Miranda July, George Saunders, Zadie Smith, Patrisse Cullors, Colson Whitehead, June Thomas, Monica Lewinsky, Jia Tolentino and Terry Pratchett.

== Podcasts ==
Podcasting highlights include:

- Better Off Dead, a series co-produced by Andrew Denton, that explored voluntary assisted dying.
- A collaboration with the oral history project Behind the Wire led to The Messenger, that takes listeners into the Australian immigration detention centre on Manus Island and follows one man's experience, and reveals, in intimate detail, what it's really like to flee tragedy and seek asylum by boat.

== Hot Desk Fellowships ==
The Wheeler Centre Hot Desk Fellowships were first awarded in 2012, supported by the Readings Foundation. In 2013, 20 fellowships were granted, whereby each recipient would receive a A$1,000 payment, and a workspace in the Wheeler Centre for two months. The fellowships were created to allow writers the space to write, along with some support from the centre's resident organisations, and the opportunity to have their work published on the Wheeler Centre website.

In 2019, in addition to the 20 Hot Desk Fellowships, three Hot Desk Fellows were granted Norma Redpath Studio residencies: fiction writer Geetha Balakrishnan from New South Wales; creative non-fiction writer Rebecca Giggs from Western Australia; and poet Yvette Holt from the Northern Territory. There was also an additional Playwright Hot Desk Fellowship, an ongoing award for an emerging female playwright.
