= Greg Dening =

Australian historian (1931–2008)

Gregory Moore Dening (29 March 1931 – 13 March 2008) was an Australian historian of the Pacific.

Dening was born in Newcastle, New South Wales. He was educated at two Jesuit schools: St. Louis School in Perth and Xavier College in Melbourne. He received an MA from the University of Melbourne and a PhD from Harvard University, where his doctoral dissertation was a historical ethnography of the Marquesas Islands. From the late 1960s, he became the centre of an ethnographic history school called the 'Melbourne Group'. He taught sociology and history at La Trobe University, Melbourne and one semester of anthropology at the University of Hawaiʻi before being appointed Max Crawford Professor of History at the University of Melbourne in 1971.

As Emeritus Professor of History at the University of Melbourne, he was one of Australia's most eminent historians, and one of the preeminent historians and anthropologists of the South Pacific. From 1998 to 2004, he taught ten-day graduate workshops at the Centre for Cross-Cultural Research at the Australian National University, Canberra. He died on 13 March 2008 in Hobart. Vanessa Smith of the University of Sydney spoke of "...his unique gift as a historian, unobtrusively demonstrating that the most acute critical perception is not incommensurate with the deepest appreciation of his subjects' human circumstances".

== Personal life ==
He entered the Society of Jesus in 1948. In 1970, he left the priesthood because he could not preach against the use of birth control, the banning of which was outlined by Pope Paul VI in his encyclical Humanae Vitae in 1968. Together with his wife, American-born Donna Merwick (another significant historian who dealt mainly with the early colonial histories of New York) Dening served as a mentor for many and often described history-making as a process of "performance". They thus centred their collaborative seminars around this notion of performing and "Doing History", as Dening called it, since it involved "present"-ing the past. His personal life was deeply entwined with his professional life, as he inspired generations of Pacific and Australian historians and taught a special brand of humility toward his subject material. He devoted much of his time to nurturing students and exploring his own fascinations with Oceania and encounters between indigenous people and outsiders on the in-between spaces of the "beach", a metaphor he developed rigorously.

== Quotes ==
- "...the abiding grace of history...[is that] it is the theatre in which we experience truth". (Performances, 1996)
- "In the theater of my history, I want the reader to go where I haven't been. It is not for me to say whether I have succeeded in doing that. I know I try to give my readers freedom by being mysterious". ("Enigma Variations on History in Three Keys: A Conversational Essay")
- "I cannot cope with an anthropology of natives and a history of strangers. I have ambitions to do an anthrohistory of them both. I have a passionate belief as well that I am a story-teller. Story is my theatre. Story is my art". ("Writing, Rewriting the Beach", Rethinking History, 2(2), p. 170)

== Bibliography ==
- Dening, Greg (1973). "History as a social system". Historical Studies. 15: 673–685. doi:10.1080/10314617308595498.
- — (1978). Xavier : a centenary portrait. Kew, Vic.: Old Xavierians' Association.
- — (1980). Islands and beaches : discourse on a silent land, Marquesas, 1774–1880. Carlton, Vic.: Melbourne University Press.
- The Death of William Gooch: A History's Anthropology ISBN 978-0-522-84692-8. 1991
- Mr Bligh's Bad Language: Passion, Power and Theater on The Bounty. ISBN 978-0-521-38370-7. 1992
- Xavier Portraits ISBN 978-0-9595926-1-0. 1993
- Performances ISBN 978-0-226-14298-2. 1996
- — (1997). "Beside the seaside". Eureka Street. 7 (8): 39.
- Readings/Writings ISBN 978-0-522-84841-0. 1998
- 'Writing, Rewriting the Beach', Rethinking History 2: 2, 1998, p. 170.
- "Enigma Variations on History in Three Keys: A Conversational Essay", History and Theory, 39, Issue 2, May 2000, 210 – 217. © Wesleyan University.
- Beach Crossings: Voyaging Across Times, Cultures and Self ISBN 978-0-522-84886-1. 2004
- Church Alive!: Pilgrimages in Faith, 1956–2006 ISBN 978-0-86840-843-9. 2006
- Wallumetta: The Other Side: Faith, Life and Worship on the North Shore 1856–2006 ISBN 978-0-86840-907-8. 2006
- William Pascoe Crook, An Account of the Marquesas Islands 1797–1799, ed. Greg Dening et al. ISBN 2-904171-66-2, 2007
- — (2007–2008). "James Joyce and the soul of Irish Jesuitry". Australasian Journal of Irish Studies. 7: 10–19.
- Challenges to Perform: History, Passion and the Imagination
- 'Wayfinding: Dancing on the Beaches of the Mind' in Gert Reifhart & Philip Morrissey, eds, Aesopic Voices: Re-framing Truth through Concealed Ways of Presentation in the 20th and 21st Centuries, Cambridge Scholars Press, 2011, pages 338–357.
