= Zelman Symphony =

Community orchestra in Melbourne, Australia

The Zelman Memorial Symphony Orchestra (Zelman Symphony) is the longest-running community orchestra in Melbourne, Australia.

== History ==
Founded by the amateur players of the Melbourne Symphony Orchestra (MSO) in 1933, the orchestra remembers the contribution to Australian music of the former conductor and leader, Alberto Zelman (Junior). It has given at least three concerts each year since that time.

Herbert Davis was the founding conductor (1933–59). He was followed by Paul McDermott (1960–73), then Leon La Gruta (1974–77). Short-term guest conductors covered the next two years until Philip Carrington was appointed in 1980. He served as conductor of the orchestra from 1980 until 1999. Since 2000, the orchestra has worked under a number of conductors well known in Melbourne's amateur and professional music circles, including Philip Carrington, Phillip Green, Peter Handsworth, Gerald Keuneman, Janis Laurs, Rick Prakhoff, Tom Pugh, Joannes Roose and Mark Shiell. Mark Shiell was then appointed Principal Conductor & Artistic Director of the orchestra in 2010 and served in this capacity until 2017 when he left to focus once again on the flute. Rick Prakhoff commenced in the role in 2018.

There have been only six appointed concertmasters of the orchestra: Bertha Jorgensen (1933–45), Connie Ziebell (1946–82), Donald Hancock (1982–2001), Yik Ming Chim (2001–2004), Mary Johnston (2009–2014) and Susan Pierotti (2016– ).

Today the Zelman Memorial Symphony Orchestra comprises some 60 players in a full symphonic ensemble, performing classical, romantic and twentieth century symphonies and concertos with fine guest soloists. The orchestra performs four concerts a year in Melbourne, including the prestigious Piano Concerto Competition of the Boroondara Eisteddfod. In addition, the orchestra takes one or two concerts each year "on the road" to Victoria country locations that have included Daylesford, Drouin, Wendouree (Ballarat) and Yea.

== Events ==
=== 80th anniversary ===
The orchestra celebrated its 80th anniversary in 2013–2014 with two performances to capacity audiences of Mahler's epic Eighth Symphony - the "Symphony of a Thousand" - at the Melbourne Town Hall. In what was believed to be "a first" for an Australian community orchestra, the performances involved over 580 performers, including an augmented Zelman Symphony of some 125 players led by guest concertmaster Wilma Smith, concertmaster of the Melbourne Symphony Orchestra (MSO), and featuring many guest principal players from the MSO and other top orchestras and music institutions. David Macfarlane played the organ, a 370-voice choir was formed from nine community choirs, and an 80-voice children's choir involved students from Southern Voices and St Catherine’s School, Toorak.

Soloists for the event were:

- Antoinette Halloran, Soprano 1, Magna Peccatrix
- Rosamund Illing, Soprano 2, Una poenitentium
- Nicole Car, Mater Gloriosa
- Karen vanSpall, Alto 1, Mulier Samaritana
- Liane Keegan, Alto 2, Maria Aegyptiaca
- Jason Wasley, Tenor, Doctor Marianus
- Andrew Jones, Baritone, Pater Ecstaticus
- Adrian Tamburini, Bass, Pater Profundu

The orchestra's celebrations concluded in grand style with a performance before an estimated 7,000 people at Melbourne's Sidney Myer Music Bowl on 22 February 2014. By invitation of the MSO, the Zelman Symphony performed a program of Russian favourites as a curtain raiser to the MSO's own performance later in the evening.

=== No Friend But The Mountains ===
No Friend But The Mountains: A Symphonic Song Cycle was based on the book No Friend But the Mountains, written by former Manus Island detention centre inmate Behrouz Boochani. The song cycle was created by composer Luke Styles and performed live on 21 March 2021 at the Sidney Myer Music Bowl by Adrian Tamburini, Zelman Symphony, and the Melbourne Bach Choir, conducted by Rick Prakhoff. The event, hosted by Australian Broadcasting Corporation journalist Rafael Epstein, was broadcast on ABC Television in June 2021 and made available on ABC iview.
