= Manus friarbird =

Conservation status
- Least Concern (IUCN 3.1)

Scientific classification
- Kingdom: Animalia
- Phylum: Chordata
- Class: Aves
- Order: Passeriformes
- Family: Meliphagidae
- Genus: Philemon
- Species: P. albitorques

Binomial name
- Philemon albitorques Sclater, PL, 1877

Species of bird

The Manus friarbird (Philemon albitorques) or white-naped friarbird, also known as the chauka ('souka' in Lele, the local language) is a species of bird in the Honeyeater family, or Meliphagidae. It is endemic to the Manus Province of Papua New Guinea.

Its natural habitat is subtropical or tropical moist lowland forests. It is also commonly found around human habitation, and possibly favoured by human settlement and the more open habitats created by people in many coastal areas.

The chauka is well known to locals on Manus Island, who speak of its ability to tell the time. It could be the most iconic honeyeater within its range in the world, as well as the loudest. Numerous stories and myths about the many abilities and duties of the chauka include alerting people to snakes in trees and informing people about a recent birth in the community.

Its significance to Manus is also reflected in its representation on the Manus provincial flag. Designer of the Manus Province flag, Luke Bulei, explained his reasons for its design in 1977: the chauka is only found in the Manus province; it heralds dawn and signals sunset; it often warns us of dangers; and lastly, it informs us of the success or otherwise of a forthcoming hunting trip. He added that NBC Radio Station had changed its name to Maus Bilong Chauka (Voice of the Chauka) several years before.

The bird was used symbolically in the film Chauka, Please Tell Us the Time, made from within the Manus Island detention centre by refugee Behrouz Boochani and filmmaker Arash Kamali Sarvestani in 2016.
