= Class discrimination =

Discrimination on the basis of social class

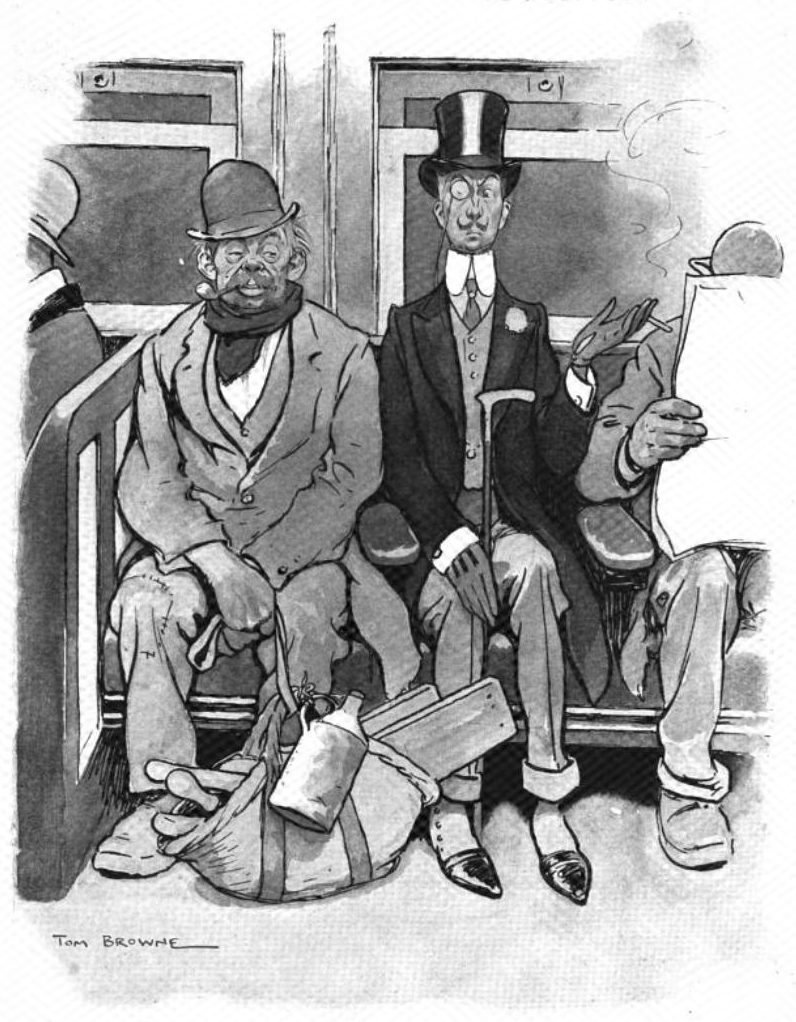
All One Class (1903) by Tom Browne, an English illustrator, depicting stereotypical rich and poor men riding the "Tuppenny Tude".

Class discrimination, also known as classism, is prejudice or discrimination on the basis of social class. It includes individual attitudes, behaviors, systems of policies and practices that are set up to benefit the upper class at the expense of the lower class. Social class refers to the grouping of individuals in a hierarchy based on wealth, income, education, occupation, and social network.

Studies show an intersection between class discrimination, racism, and sexism. In countries such as India, Singapore, Bangladesh, and Pakistan, classism intersects with casteism and continues to be reinforced even within their diasporic communities, despite being illegal in the host countries where they reside. Legislation shows efforts to reduce such intersections and classism at an individual level.

== History ==
Class structures existed in a simplified form in pre-agricultural societies, but they have evolved to be more intricate following the establishment of permanent agriculture-based civilizations with a food surplus.

Segregation into classes was accomplished through observable traits (such as race or profession) that were accorded varying statuses and privileges. Feudal classification systems might include merchant, serf, peasant, warrior, priestly, and noble classes. The established hierarchy varied greatly from community to community; for example, the merchant class in Europe would outrank the peasantry, while merchants were explicitly inferior to peasants during the Tokugawa Shogunate in Japan. Other prominent forms of classism include India's caste system, where caste and class often intersected and caused discrimination against certain peoples. Discrimination against the poor in Western cultures spans back to early America, with many of the people who were sent to the Colonies being poor. Those who were sent over to the Colonies either became indentured servants or nomadic "squatters"; their impoverished status, with the intersectionality of classism and racism, resulted in their consideration as "not quite white", leading to discrimination further on from both North and South.

Modern classism is harder to identify due to its class structures being less rigid. In a professional association posting, psychologist Thomas Fuller-Rowell states, "Experiences of [class] discrimination are often subtle rather than blatant, and the exact reason for unfair treatment is often not clear to the victim."

== Intersections with other systems of oppression ==
Both gender and racial inequality intersect with class discrimination, influencing economic opportunities and social mobility for marginalized groups.

Class discrimination and gender inequality intersect by shaping economic disparities that disproportionately affect women, particularly those in lower-income groups. Research indicates that women are more likely to be employed in low-wage and part-time jobs, limiting their financial security and career advancement opportunities. Occupational segregation, where women are overrepresented in sectors such as caregiving and retail, contributes to persistent wage gaps. For example, as of 2022, Black women make up 6% of employed workers but are 32% of home aids, where they earn on average $23,803 per year. Women constitute nearly two-thirds of workers in the 20 occupations with the lowest median wages for full-time, year-round employees. Additionally, economic barriers can exacerbate gender inequality in access to education and leadership positions, reinforcing systemic disadvantages.

Similarly, the intersection of class and racial discrimination manifests in economic disparities that disproportionately impact racial and ethnic minorities. Studies show that historical and structural barriers, including discriminatory labor policies and unequal access to education, contribute to income inequality among marginalized groups. Racial minorities are more likely to experience employment precarity and wage suppression, leading to reduced economic mobility compared to their white counterparts. According to studies, discrimination also plays a role in the hiring process. In one study by Bertrand and Mullainathan, the same job application was sent to employers, but with different names that hinted at race, and white names received significantly more callbacks.

Furthermore, racism persists within poor communities, including those with predominantly Black populations. This is often characterized as symbolic racism, where negative stereotypes associate Black individuals with social threats or anti-normative behavior (e.g., involvement in drugs or robbery), which is used to justify social exclusion. This form of racism can exist even among people of similar low socioeconomic status, suggesting it may stem from symbolic competition and social categorization rather than solely from direct competition for economic resources. Poverty itself functions as a discriminatory label, often intertwined with perceptions of social class and skin color. Individuals identified as beneficiaries of social policies (a marker of low-income status) report experiencing discrimination from non-beneficiaries. Individuals experiencing poverty may face various forms of discrimination but might not always identify racism as the specific cause, especially when dealing with multiple overlapping disadvantages. Both explicit and subtle forms of racism are reported.

The sociocultural self model of behavior explains that individuals are shaped by the social environment around them, which constantly impacts their behavior. This model demonstrates how social class directly betters or worsens the physical and mental health of an individual. Although often seen as insignificant, the standing of an individual in a social class indicates who they are surrounded by and the career and opportunities that person is exposed to most often.

== Institutional versus personal classism ==
The term classism can refer to personal prejudice (an individual's inclination to judge or treat others negatively based on their own rigid beliefs or emotions rather than objective evidence or critical reflection) against lower classes as well as to institutional classism (the ways in which intentional and unintentional classism is manifest in the various institutions of our society). Similarly, the term racism can refer either strictly to personal prejudice or to institutional racism. The latter has been defined as "the ways in which conscious or unconscious classism is manifest in the various institutions of our society".

As with social classes, the difference in social status between people determines how they behave toward each other and the prejudices they likely hold. People of higher status do not generally mix with lower-status people and often are able to control other people's activities by influencing laws and social standards.

The term "interpersonal" is sometimes used in place of "personal" as in "institutional classism (versus) interpersonal classism" and terms such as "attitude" or "attitudinal" may replace "interpersonal" as contrasting with institutional classism as in the Association of Magazine Media's definition of classism as "any attitude or institutional practice which subordinates people due to income, occupation, education and/or their economic condition".

Classism is also sometimes broken down into more than two categories as in "personal, institutional and cultural" classism.

== Structural positions ==
Schüssler Fiorenza describes interdependent "stratifications of gender, race, class, religion, heterosexualism, and age" as structural positions assigned at birth. She suggests that people inhabit several positions, and that positions with privilege become nodal points through which other positions are experienced. For example, in a context where gender is the primary privileged position (e.g. patriarchy, matriarchy), gender becomes the nodal point through which sexuality, race, and class are experienced. In a context where class is the primary privileged position (i.e. classism), gender and race are experienced through class dynamics. Fiorenza stresses that kyriarchy is not a hierarchical system, as it does not focus on one point of domination. Instead, it is described as a "complex pyramidal system" with those on the bottom of the pyramid experiencing the "full power of kyriarchal oppression". The kyriarchy is recognized as the status quo, and therefore, its oppressive structures may not be recognized.

Building on this, Deborah King's concept of multiple jeopardy provides further insight into how these oppressions interact in multiplicative rather than merely additive ways. King argues that intersecting systems of race, gender, and class discrimination do not simply add up to a triple burden but rather compound and intensify each other, creating unique conditions of subjugation. Thus, in the kyriarchal system, positions of oppression do not act independently but rather reinforce one another in specific, context-dependent ways. For instance, while Black women historically endured both racial and gendered violence, they also suffered from exploitation tied to class dynamics, with their labor and reproduction contributing directly to economic structures of enslavement. The importance of any one axis (e.g., race, class, or gender) in determining conditions for marginalized individuals varies according to context, further highlighting the nuanced and contextually bound nature of oppression.

To maintain this system, kyriarchy relies on the creation of a servant class, race, gender, or people. The position of this class is reinforced through "education, socialization, and brute violence and malestream rationalization". Tēraudkalns suggests that these structures of oppression are self-sustained by internalized oppression; those with relative power tend to remain in power, while those without tend to remain disenfranchised. In addition, structures of oppression amplify and feed into each other, intensifying and altering the forms of discrimination experienced by those in different social positions.

In the UAE, Western workers and local nationals are given better treatment or are preferred, illustrating how institutional biases based on class and nationality create compounded disadvantages for other groups. This layered and compounding nature of oppression supports King's argument that intersecting systems of discrimination operate together, reinforcing complex patterns of privilege and subjugation.

== Media representation ==
Class discrimination can be seen in many forms of media such as television shows, films and social media.

Classism is also systemic, and its implications can go unnoticed in any form of consumable media. Class discrimination in media usually falls back onto older societal opinions, which most people may be numb to. Media may mirror what people think, and how they feel, about classism. People tend to imitate and project these ideals into the real world when seeing class discrimination in films and television shows. Children can be exposed to class discrimination through movies, with a large pool of high-grossing G-rated movies portraying classism in various contexts. As a result, they may develop harmful biases at a young age, which would demonstrate the issues with class discrimination being prevalent in media.

Media has a big influence on the world today, in which something such as classism can be seen in many different lights. Media plays an important role in how certain groups of people are perceived, which can make certain biases stronger. Usually, lower income people are displayed in the media as dirty, uneducated, ill-mannered, and homeless. People can use media to learn more about different social classes or-- in the case of social media-- to influence others on what they believe. In some cases, people who are in a social class that is portrayed negatively in media are affected in school and social life; for example, "teenagers who grew up in poverty reported higher levels of discrimination, and the poorer the teens were, the more they experienced discrimination".

However, within media analysis, class as a specific variable is often less emphasized than race or gender. Media itself frequently lacks clear definitions for class categories, sometimes conflating the working class with the broader middle class. Complex issues pertinent to the working class tend to be underreported unless linked to specific news beats like crime or major crises. The poor often experience "benign neglect" in media, frequently being represented as impersonal statistics rather than individuals. When depicted individually, portrayals can be negative, emphasizing stereotypes related to deviance (alcoholism, drug abuse, crime, mental illness) or dependency, often without addressing underlying structural issues. More sympathetic framing tends to be reserved for specific demographics (children, elderly, physically ill) or situations (holidays, disasters). Research cited indicates a tendency to overrepresent African Americans in negative poverty narratives.

When not ignored, the working class is often subjected to stereotypical and caricatured representations. Common tropes include the working-class man as a buffoon (incompetent, immature, needing guidance from a more sensible wife) or a bigot, prevalent in many television sitcoms (e.g., The Honeymooners, All in the Family, The Simpsons). Derogatory labels associated with lower-class status, such as "white trash," are sometimes used or amplified by media coverage. Working-class women might be depicted as lacking refinement or violating middle-class standards of femininity.

== Legislation ==
There are legislative measures that aim to prevent discrimination and ensure equal opportunities for all individuals, regardless of class background. Several laws protect individuals from discrimination based on race, gender, religion, and national origin, indirectly addressing class disparities.

One example is the Fair Labor Standards Act of 1938 (FLSA), which is a U.S. federal law that establishes labor standards for employees, primarily focusing on minimum wage, overtime pay, child labor, and recordkeeping. The FLSA was originally designed as a tool to reduce class inequality. Employers are set to pay a minimum wage, which has changed over time. With an increase from $5.85 to $7.25 per hour in stages, taking place from 2007 to 2009. However, employees working more than 40 hours per week must receive overtime pay at 1.5 times their regular pay rate.

The Equal Pay Act of 1963 (EPA) aimed to eliminate gender-based disparities by mandating equal pay for equal work. However, the EPA did not include provisions for a living wage or broader labor protections, leaving many workers earning wages insufficient to meet basic living standards.

Title VII of the Civil Rights Act of 1964 removes discrimination in employment opportunity on the basis of "race, color, religion, sex, and national origin". It covers all determinations within employment, including hiring and termination. It also prohibits grouping employees in a way that might deprive potential hires of employment, or may negatively influence their statuses as employees.

The 1968 Fair Housing Act made it illegal to racially discriminate on the basis of renting or selling a home. It was followed by the Equal Credit Opportunity Act and Community Reinvestment Act.

The European Convention on Human Rights also includes protections against discrimination, including on the basis of social class. Specifically, Article 14 of the Convention prohibits discrimination on a variety of grounds, including "social origin," which is interpreted to encompass class background.

The Earned Income Tax Credit is described as a program for families of the working poor earning below a specified income threshold. An article citing a 2000 IRS source related to earned income reports that in 1997, this program lost $7.8 billion due to factors identified as "fraud and errors". It further states that these funds, which could have benefited the working poor, were consequently unavailable to them due to mismanagement and theft.

== See also ==
- Apartheid
- Baby Scoop Era
- Caste system
- Class conflict
- Class consciousness
- Debtors' prison
- Economic inequality
- Economic stratification
- Elitism
- Forced adoption
- Keeping Up Appearances
- Legacy preferences
- Marxism
- Populism
- Racial discrimination
- Rankism
- Social inequality
