= Kyriarchy =

In feminist theory, a social system based on oppression

In feminist theory, kyriarchy (/ˈkaɪriɑːrki/ KY-ree-arr-kee) is a social system or set of connecting social systems built around domination, oppression, and submission.

The word was coined by Elisabeth Schüssler Fiorenza in 1992 to describe her theory of interconnected, interacting, and self-extending systems of domination and submission, in which a single individual might be oppressed in some relationships and privileged in others.

It is an intersectional extension of the idea of patriarchy beyond gender. Kyriarchy encompasses forms of dominating hierarchies in which the subordination of one individual or group to another is internalized and institutionalized.

== Etymology ==
The term was coined into English by Elisabeth Schüssler Fiorenza in 1992 when she published her book But She Said: Feminist Practices of Biblical Interpretation. It is derived from Greek: κύριος, kyrios, "lord, master" and Greek: ἄρχω, árcho, "lead, rule, govern". The word kyriarchy (Greek: κυριαρχία, kyriarchia), already existed in Modern Greek, and means "sovereignty".

== Usage ==
The term was originally developed in the context of feminist theological discourse, and has been used in some other areas of academia as a non–gender-based descriptor of systems of power, as opposed to patriarchy. It is also widely used outside of scholarly contexts.

The Kurdish-Iranian asylum seeker Behrouz Boochani has described the Australian-run Manus Island prison as a kyriarchal system: one where different forms of oppression intersect; oppression is not random but purposeful, designed to isolate and create friction amongst prisoners, leading to despair and broken spirits. He elaborates on this in his autobiographical account of the prison, No Friend But the Mountains.

== Structural positions ==
Schüssler Fiorenza describes interdependent "stratifications of gender, race, class, religion, heterosexualism, and age" as structural positions assigned at birth. She suggests that people inhabit several positions, and that positions with privilege become nodal points through which other positions are experienced. For example, in a context where gender is the primary privileged position (e.g. patriarchy, matriarchy), gender becomes the nodal point through which sexuality, race, and class are experienced. In a context where class is the primary privileged position (i.e. classism), gender and race are experienced through class dynamics. Fiorenza stresses that kyriarchy is not a hierarchical system as it does not focus on one point of domination. Instead it is described as a "complex pyramidal system" with those on the bottom of the pyramid experiencing the "full power of kyriarchal oppression". The kyriarchy is recognized as the status quo and therefore its oppressive structures may not be recognized.

To maintain this system, kyriarchy relies on the creation of a servant class, race, gender, or people. The position of this class is reinforced through "education, socialization, and brute violence and malestream rationalization". Tēraudkalns suggests that these structures of oppression are self-sustained by internalized oppression; those with relative power tend to remain in power, while those without tend to remain disenfranchised. In addition, structures of oppression amplify and feed into each other.

== See also ==
- Autocracy
- Bullying
- Feminist theology
- Hierarchy
- Identity politics
- Male privilege
- Might makes right
- Oligarchy
- Patriarchy
- Social dominance orientation
- Toxic masculinity
