= Chauka, Please Tell Us the Time =

2017 film by Behrouz Boochani

- Directed by: Arash Kamali Sarvestani; Behrouz Boochani
- Written by: Arash Kamali Sarvestani; Behrouz Boochani
- Produced by: Arash Kamali Sarvestani
- Cinematography: Behrouz Boochani
- Edited by: Arash Kamali Sarvestani
- Music by: Aram Kamali Sarvestani
- Production company: Sarvin Productions
- Release date: 11 June 2017 (Sydney Film Festival)
- Running time: 90 Minutes
- Country: Papua New Guinea
- Languages: English, Persian, Kurdish

Chauka, Please Tell Us the Time is a documentary film co-directed by Kurdish-Iranian refugee Behrouz Boochani and Netherlands-based Iranian filmmaker Arash Kamali Sarvestani released in 2017. It was shot by Boochani from inside Australia's Manus Island detention centre in Papua New Guinea. The whole film was shot over six months on a smartphone, which had to be kept secret from the prison authorities.

== Themes ==
Boochani, a journalist who was persecuted for his activism in Iran, was forced into hiding and fled Iran in 2013. He was intercepted by Australian authorities while attempting a boat crossing from Indonesia to Australia and incarcerated in the Manus Island detention centre. "After a year or two years I found out that the journalism language is not powerful enough to tell the suffering and to tell the history of this prison, and what Australian government is doing in this island", said Boochani.

A chauka is a tiny bird native to Manus Island and is also the name of the high-security prison within the camp. The chauka is a symbol of the island and allows locals to tell the time from the chauka's regular singing. In a sinister twist, it is pronounced the same as the English word "choker."

The symbolism of the chauka is explained by Boochani as integral to the structure and narrative. He said in an interview that there were "two kinds of Chauka. In the thinking of local people Chauka is beautiful and it’s their identity. They love this bird and this culture and are living every day with this concept. But the prisoners think Chauka is equal to torture and suffering. We wanted to put these two Chaukas on the table to let people choose one of them. Be sure that people will love the beautiful Chauka not the ugly one. It’s the reality of being human that we choose beauty not ugliness". Also the political aims of the Australian government, who were "using this island...for their own political aims. We can see that [their] thinking...is still based on colonialism because they used the name of the beautiful Chauka for a place to torture people".

The film does not use action shots of violence, and there is very little commentary, aiming to invite audiences to see the lives of the refugees through their own eyes. There are shots of local children dancing to Kurdish songs sung by Boochani. It shows him "watching this prison in a poetic way, and understanding there is some beauty even in the midst of the immense suffering around me. It's me sharing my life in a cinematic language". Apart from informing the audience about how the Australian government is punishing the asylum seekers on this remote island, he also wanted to show "Manusian culture, how beautiful it is and how kind they are, and how they are also victims under this system that is still based on colonialism. The movie’s message is about humanity and respecting different people and different cultures".

Boochani has described the film as the most important work he had created, before his book No Friend But the Mountains: Writing from Manus Prison was published in 2018. In both works, he theorises that the prison is a kyriarchal system (a term borrowed from feminist theory), one where different forms of oppression intersect; oppression is not random but purposeful, designed to isolate and create friction amongst prisoners, leading to despair and broken spirits.

Boochani said in a radio interview on Autonomous Action Radio that it was his intention to show the Australian public what the government was doing to detainees on the island.

== Production ==
Making the film under such unusual circumstances brought many challenges. Sending and receiving the video files due to technological limitations, the issue of working with someone whom they had never met face to face before, and, for Sarvestani, trying to depict what life was like for an asylum seeker on Manus Island, from the comforts of his studio at home. But over time they began to work well together, and "…after two to three months I really felt I was in the camp... I was thinking I am one of the detainees," according to Sarvestani. Boochani described Sarvestani as a "great artist because he was drowning in our lives in this prison and he could create this movie because of his deep imagination and understanding of what it is like". He said that they understood each other well and talked for hours every day. They discovered that their mutual love of Iranian filmmaker Abbas Kiarostami, with whom Sarvestani had worked in the past, and this gave Boochani a feeling of power that they could make this film despite the obstacles, which included the clandestine nature of the filming.

Australian writer, artist and refugee advocate Janet Galbraith was on the island at the time and participated in conversations with islanders discussing the meaning of the chauka in indigenous culture. The men are appalled that the high-security prison within the camp has been named after the bird.

== Release ==
The film had its world premiere at the Sydney Film Festival on 11 June 2017. Sarvestani attended the Sydney and Melbourne screenings as an invited guest, but Boochani's application for a visa to attend was turned down by the Department of Immigration and Border Protection. Boochani wrote to the UK high commissioner to Australia requesting a UK visa to attend the London Premiere at the BFI London Film Festival in October 2017, and chief executive of the Media Entertainment and Arts Alliance Paul Murphy, also wrote in support, as did Clare Stewart, Director of the BFI London Film Festival, but it is not clear if a visa was ever granted by the UK Government.

- Sydney Film Festival, 11 June 2017
- Australian Centre for the Moving Image, Melbourne, 16 June 2017 (special event screenings)
- Darwin International Film Festival, September 2017
- Adelaide Film Festival, October 2017
- Canberra International Film Festival, October–November 2017
- Document International Human Rights Documentary Film Festival, Glasgow, October 2017
- BFI London Film Festival, October 2017
- Gothenburg Film Festival, Five Continents category, Sweden, January 2018
- DocEdge Film Festival, Auckland, New Zealand 2018
- Berliner Festspiele, Berlin, Germany, March 2018

== Critical response ==
A review of the film was written by the award-winning writer Arnold Zable, which talks of "startling, poetic surreal-like images" and "theme of the Chauka, and what it symbolises [being] a brilliant conception", saying that the film-makers " transcend the severe limitations of the circumstances under which the film was shot, to give us a glimpse of hell, juxtaposed against the island’s tropical beauty and fragments of its indigenous culture". In another article about the making of the film, Zable reports that upon its release at the Sydney Film Festival and Melbourne ACMI, it "was received with popular and critical acclaim".

A review on Junkee calls the film a "simple but intensely confronting documentary".

ACMI writer Enza Capobianco calls it "an unprecedented work, not only because of the circumstances surrounding its clandestine execution, but also because the final product is more than an explosive exposé. The directors' shared love of film minimalism, in combination with the insight afforded by Behrouz's own lived experience in the centre, has resulted in an intimate and poetic call to action to end to off-shore detention".

Broadsheet says it is "an essential film for all Australians".

== Accolades ==
- 2017 Grierson Award, which recognises films "with integrity, originality, and social or cultural significance" - Nomination.
- Audience Award for Best Documentary at Sydney Film Festival - 3rd place.
