= Manus Regional Processing Centre =

Australian immigration detention facility in Papua New Guinea (2001–2017)

Coordinates: 2°2′16″S 147°22′9″E

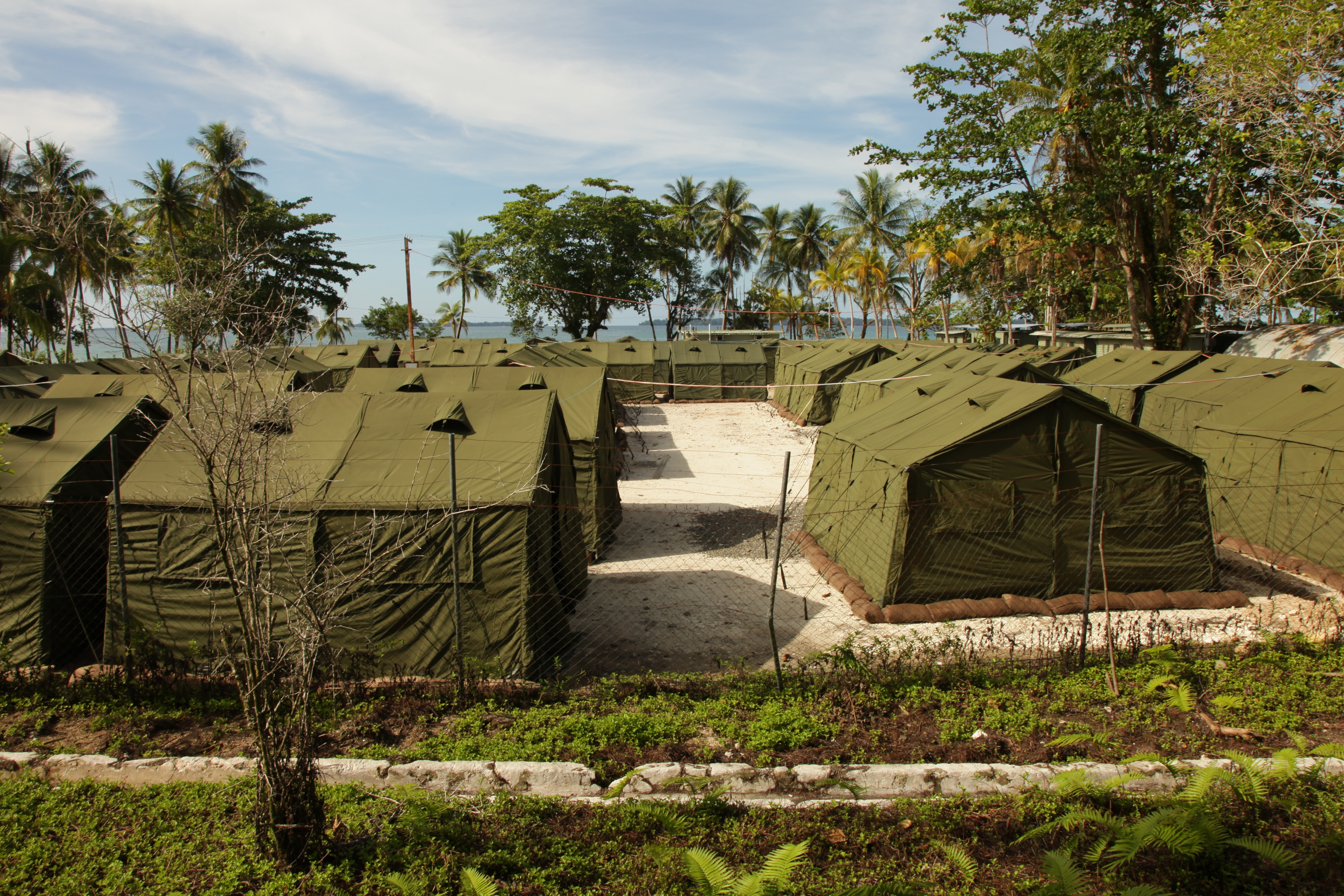
- Interactive map of Manus Regional Processing Centre
- Location: Los Negros Island, Papua New Guinea
- Opened: 2001
- Former name: Manus Island Regional Processing Centre
- Managed by: Lombrum Naval Base

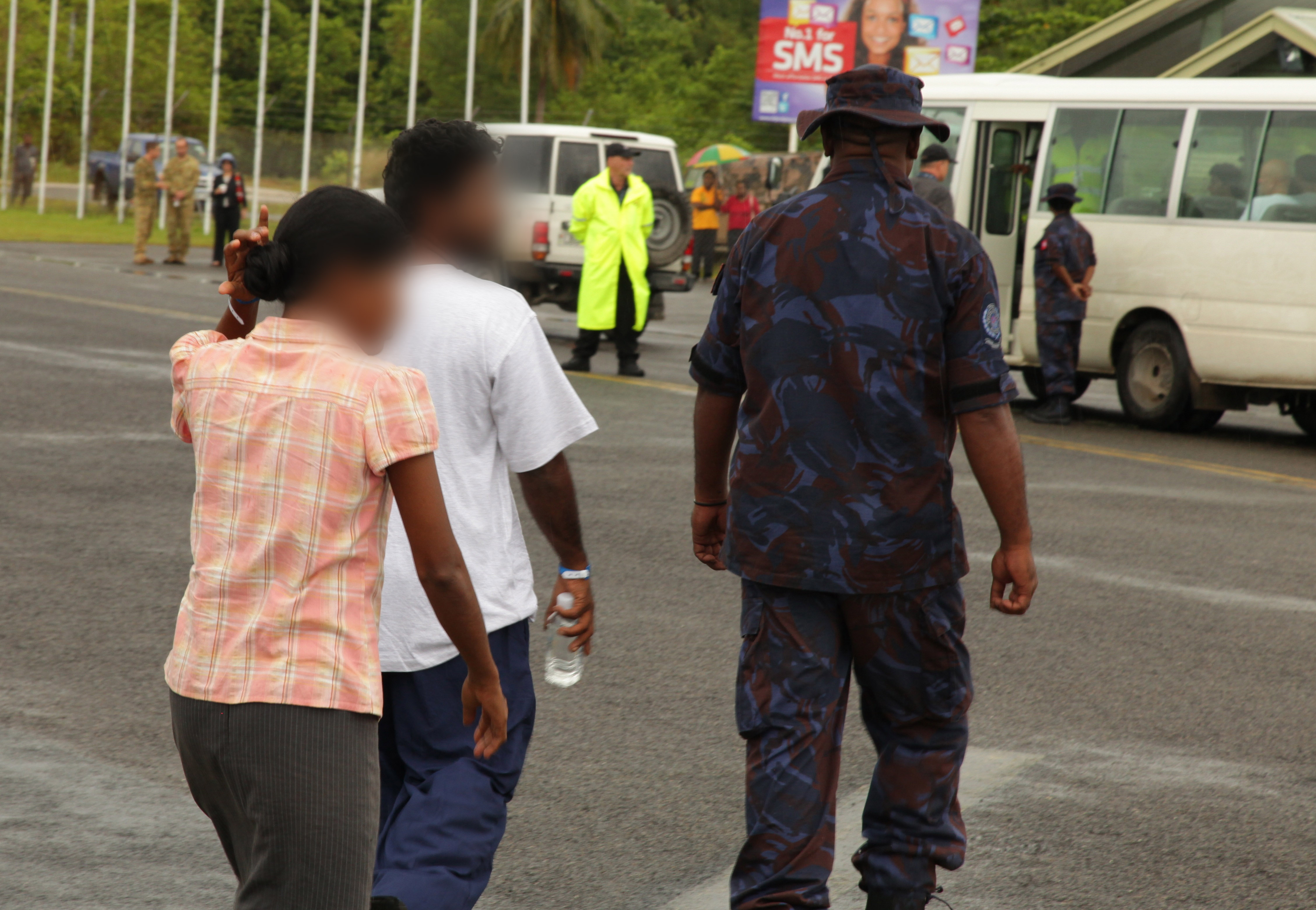
First arrivals at Manus Island Airport

The Manus Regional Processing Centre, or Manus Island Regional Processing Centre (MIRCP), was one of a number of offshore Australian immigration detention facilities. The centre was located on the PNG Navy Base Lombrum (previously a Royal Australian Navy base called HMAS Tarangau) on Los Negros Island in Manus Province, Papua New Guinea.

It was originally established in 2001, along with Nauru Regional Processing Centre, as an "offshore processing centre" (OPC) as part of the Pacific Solution policy created by the Howard government. After falling into disuse in 2003, it was formally closed by the first Rudd government in 2008, but reopened by the Gillard government in 2012. As part of the PNG Solution by the second Rudd government, it was announced in July 2013 that those sent to PNG would never be resettled in Australia. After Tony Abbott became PM in a change of government a few months later, the government announced its Operation Sovereign Borders policy, aimed at stopping maritime arrivals of asylum seekers to Australia, commencing on 18 September 2013.

Many high-profile and ordinary Australians called for the centre to be closed and the men brought to Australia or resettled elsewhere, over the seven years of its existence. The United Nations High Commissioner for Refugees has cited the centre as an "indictment of a policy meant to avoid Australia's international obligations". It was formally closed on 31 October 2017; however hundreds of detainees ("transferees" according to the Australian government) refused to leave the centre and a stand-off ensued. On 23 November 2017, a few were resettled in the United States as part of a refugee swap deal.

Between August and November 2019, the last former detainees were moved to Port Moresby, with the government's regional processing contractors instructed to terminate services on 30 November 2019. High-profile detainee, the Iranian-Kurdish writer and activist Behrouz Boochani, went to New Zealand in November on a one-month visa to speak at WORD Christchurch event.

By November 2019 at least eight of the detainees had died by various means, including suicides, some on Manus and some after being transferred to Australia on medical grounds, since first being detained in the facility. As of June 2020, over 100 men from Manus and Nauru were being detained in an hotel in Brisbane, after being transferred to the mainland for medical treatment, confined to quarters under a lockdown during the COVID-19 pandemic. They were released into the community in February 2021.

In October 2021, the Australian Government cut off all support to the 124 remaining men on the island, leaving PNG to take over responsibility for them.

== Background ==
The Manus Regional Processing Centre, officially Manus Island Regional Processing Centre (MIRCP), was one of a number of offshore Australian immigration detention facilities created after the Australian Government instituted its Operation Sovereign Borders policy, aimed at stopping maritime arrivals of asylum seekers to Australia. The operation is the outcome of a 2013 federal election policy of the Coalition, which commenced on 18 September 2013 after the election of the Abbott government.

The centre was located on the PNG Navy Base Lombrum (previously a Royal Australian Navy base called HMAS Tarangau) on Los Negros Island in Manus Province, Papua New Guinea.

=== Service contractors ===
From November 2012 the British services company G4S was responsible for its operation. From March 2014, security was managed by Wilson Security, while food and maintenance at the centre were operated by Transfield Services, later renamed Broadspectrum, until Ferrovial bought out that company and its contract in April 2016. Broadspectrum later subcontracted Wilson to perform operations at Manus and Nauru. In September 2016 Wilson announced that it would be withdrawing at the end of its contract in October 2017, citing damage to its reputation, and Ferrovial, major owner of Broadspecturm, also announced that it would cease providing services to the Department of Immigration and Border Protection at the same date.

After the centre had officially ceased operating as a detention centre at the end of 2017, Paladin Holdings and NKW Holdings were given contracts to maintain the camp, which were terminated on 30 November 2019.

== Timeline ==
=== 1960s: West Papuan refugees on Manus Island ===
University of Sydney immigration law specialist Professor Mary Crock says that Australia's history of offshore processing goes back to the 1960s, when Manus Island was set up to take refugees from West Papua. Known as "Salasia Camp", it consisted of a few corrugated iron houses on a bare concrete slab, not far from a beach near the main town Lorengau. Indonesia was preparing a military takeover of the former Dutch New Guinea colony in the 1960s, causing thousands of refugees, known as "West Irians" to flee into the then Australian colony of Papua New Guinea. Many were turned back by Australian patrol officers on the border but a few dozen received special visas and the first were sent to Manus in 1968 by the Australian government, to a camp was built by Australia in order to avoid a diplomatic confrontation with Indonesia. According to historian Klaus Neumann of Deakin University, "Australia had not objected to Indonesia's takeover of the Dutch colony, and Australia had recognised Indonesia was now in charge of former Western New Guinea, so for Australia to grant refugee status posed a diplomatic problem". So by sending them to the remotest place in PNG the Australian authorities thought they would avoid any trouble with Indonesia. The camp was not a detention centre, and many stayed on, stateless, until in 2017, these West Papuans were finally offered PNG citizenship.

=== 2001: The Pacific Solution ===
The centre was originally established on 21 October 2001, as one of two Offshore Processing Centres (OPC). The other OPC was the Nauru detention centre. The OPC facilities were part of what became known as the "Pacific Solution", a policy of the Howard government in Australia, which was implemented in the wake of the Tampa affair. The policy involved the excision of Australian external territories (Christmas Island, Ashmore and Cartier Islands and Cocos (Keeling) Island) and other islands in the Pacific Ocean—from the Australian migration zone. Asylum-seekers arriving by boat without visas in these excised territories to seek asylum in Australia) were transferred to the OPC facilities where they would stay while their claims for asylum were processed. The centres were managed by the International Organization for Migration (IOM).

=== 2003–2008: disuse and closure ===
The Manus Regional Processing Centre fell into disuse in preference to the Nauru centre. In July 2003, the immigration department announced that the centre would be wound down and the remaining detainees would be granted asylum and resettled in Australia. However, the centre would continue to be maintained in case the need for reactivation arose.

Aladdin Sisalem, a Kuwaiti-born Palestinian, fled Kuwait in 2000 and in December 2002 arrived at an island in the Torres Strait where he claimed asylum, and was sent to the Manus centre. For ten months, Sisalem was the sole detainee at the centre, with a small staff of guards and cleaners for company. In May 2004, he was resettled in Melbourne.

With the election of the Rudd government (Labor) in 2007, the Manus Regional Processing Centre was formally closed in early 2008, fulfilling an election promise by Rudd to end the offshore processing system.

=== 2012–2013: Reopening and the "PNG solution" ===
In 2012, a significant rise in the number of irregular maritime arrivals saw the "asylum issue" become a political liability for the government. The Gillard government commissioned Angus Houston, former Chief of the Defence Force, to lead an expert panel to conduct a review of asylum arrangements. Among the 22 recommendations made in the Houston report was one to re-open the OPC facilities on Nauru and at the Manus Regional Processing Centre.

In November 2012, the Manus Regional Processing Centre was re-opened by the Labor government, due to the large volume of irregular maritime arrivals. Then Immigration Minister Chris Bowen stated "At this stage, family groups are best accommodated on Manus Island, as opposed to Nauru." The British services company G4S was responsible for its operation.

In July 2013, shortly after Kevin Rudd returned as prime minister for a second time, the government announced that boat arrivals would never be allowed to resettle in Australia. The following month, it agreed to give Papua New Guinea A$400m (£230m; $310m) in aid in exchange for their part of the deal, which included agreeing to resettle refugees. Officially called the Regional Resettlement Arrangement between Australia and Papua New Guinea, the policy became known as the PNG Solution. On 19 July 2013 Rudd and Papua New Guinean Prime Minister Peter O'Neill announced the Regional Resettlement Arrangement policy in Brisbane.

After the Liberal/National coalition won the federal election on 7 September 2013, Tony Abbott was sworn in as Prime Minister, and Operation Sovereign Borders came into effect, reinforcing the policy of no maritime arrivals being resettled in Australia.

The Australian government's decision to resume offshore processing met with domestic political opposition from the Greens.

In March 2014, the contract with G4S expired, and the Australian government entered into a 20-month contract worth AUD $1.22 billion with Broadspectrum (which operated the facility in Nauru) for facilities management including building maintenance and catering, with security provided by Wilson Security.

=== 2014 ===
==== Riots; murder of Reza Barati ====
On 17 February 2014, a series of protests by detainees at the centre escalated into a serious disturbance, which resulted in injuries to about 70 asylum seekers as well as the death of one detainee: 23-year-old Iranian asylum seeker Reza Berati was murdered by being struck with wood and a rock. In April 2016 two detention centre workers, Joshua Kaluvia and Louie Efi, were each sentenced to 10 years in jail for Berati's murder.

==== Cornall Review ====
Robert Cornall was appointed in February 2014 to conduct "a review into the circumstances surrounding the Manus centre disturbances" leading up to Berati's death with the primary focus on management of security at the centre. Cornall presented his review to the Immigration Department on 23 May 2014.

Cornall had previously conducted an investigation into allegations of sexual abuse at the Manus Regional Processing Centre, his report being presented to the Department in September 2013.

==== Death of Hamid Kehazaei ====
On 24 August 2014, 24-year-old Iranian asylum seeker Hamid Kehazaei sought medical treatment at the detention centre's clinic for an infected wound after cutting his foot. Kehazaei's condition worsened and he could not be treated on the island. Medical staff sought his immediate evacuation, but permission was not granted until 26 August. Kehazaei was declared brain dead in a Brisbane hospital on 2 September 2016. With his family's permission, his life-support was switched off on 5 September 2016. An inquest into Kehazaei's death began in the Coroner's Court in Brisbane on 28 November 2016. The article "The day my friend Hamid Kehazaei died", written by Behrouz Boochani, tells the story of Kehazaei's death.

=== 2015 ===
==== April: Hunger strike ====
In January 2015, up to 500 men went on a hunger strike, barricading themselves in the camp, with at least 20 men sewing their lips together in protest. This was met with force. In March 2015, Prime Minister Tony Abbott said he was "sick of being lectured" by the UN over Australia's treatment of asylum seekers, reiterating that its policy saves lives at sea.

A controversial decision by the Australian government in July 2015 to make reporting of abuse within the centre illegal prompted staff at those centres to begin a campaign of civil disobedience.

=== 2016 ===
==== April: declared illegal by PNG court ====
On 26 April 2016, the Supreme Court of Papua New Guinea found that the Centre breached the PNG constitution's right to personal liberty, and was thus illegal. It said:

Both the Australian and Papua New Guinea governments shall forthwith take all steps necessary to cease and prevent the continued unconstitutional and illegal detention of the asylum seekers or transferees at the relocation centre on Manus Island ..."

Late on 27 April 2016, Papua New Guinea Prime Minister Peter O'Neill announced that the processing centre would be closed, saying his government "will immediately ask the Australian Government to make alternative arrangements for the asylum seekers" and that "we did not anticipate the asylum seekers to be kept as long as they have been at the Manus Centre." He said that Papua New Guinea was proud to play an important role in stopping the loss of life due to people smuggling. O'Neill said negotiations with Australia would focus on the timeframe for the closure and for the settlement of legitimate refugees interested in staying in Papua New Guinea.

Australia's immigration minister, Peter Dutton, confirmed on 17 August 2016 that the centre was to be closed, but no timescale was given.

==== November–December: US resettlement deal, another death ====
In November 2016 it was announced that a deal had been made with the United States to resettle people held in detention on Manus (and Nauru) Islands. Details were not made public, but the US would determine the total number of refugees it would take, eligible applicants still needing to clear US authorities' "extreme vetting" procedures.

In December, 27-year-old Sudanese refugee Faysal Ishal Ahmed, allegedly ill for months, died after suffering a seizure and a fall.

=== 2017 ===
==== April: PNG Defence Force attack ====
On 14 April 2017, asylum seekers and centre staff alleged they had been shot at by locals. Ray Numa, Chief of Staff of the Papua New Guinea Defence Force, confirmed that staff at Lombrum Naval Base were investigating the involvement of PNG defence personnel in the attacks, stressing that misuse of weapons was a serious breach of military discipline, and that the police would prosecute any members breaching civil laws. Australian authorities later confirmed that nine people were injured when PNGDF personnel had fired "many" shots into the compound, with Prime Minister Malcolm Turnbull's government claiming that the incident was sparked by locals' anger over claims that a boy had been led towards the centre by asylum seekers, but this version was disputed by PNG Police Commissioner David Yapu, who said that nothing had happened to the boy.

==== June: AU$70m class action settlement ====
A class action suit on behalf of persons detained on Manus Island from 21 November 2012 until 19 December 2014, and 21 November 2012 until 12 May 2016 was brought by lead plaintiff Majid Karami Kamasaee against the Commonwealth of Australia, G4S Australia and Broadspectrum. The claim was in negligence and false imprisonment. Kamasaee was represented by law firm Slater and Gordon.

Slater and Gordon reached a settlement with the Commonwealth of Australia, G4S Australia and Broadspectrum on 14 June 2017 for $70 million plus costs (estimated at $20 million), with no admission of liability. Immigration Minister Peter Dutton said the settlement was not an admission of liability and the Commonwealth strongly refuted and denied the claims brought in the class action.

==== August–October: 2 deaths; US takes first refugees ====
On 7 August 2017 Iranian asylum seeker Hamed Shamshiripour was found dead in Lorengau. He was known to have a history of mental illness and refugee advocates had been trying to get help for him.

In September 2017, the US accepted 22 refugees from Manus Island, its first intake under the resettlement deal, with others apparently taking the number up to 54.

On 2 October 2017, 32-year-old Sri Lankan Tamil, Rajeev Rajendran, was found dead on the grounds of the Lorengau hospital, a suspected suicide.

==== 31 October: closure of centre ====
The centre was formally closed on 31 October 2017. However, nearly 600 men refused to leave the centre, citing fears for their safety amid hostile locals. A notice posted during the night by PNG Immigration authorities said "The Manus RPC will close at 5 pm today" (31 October), and that all power, water and food supply would cease. The PNG military took control of the area. Alternative accommodation had been provided at the East Lorengau Refugee Transit Centre and West Lorengau Haus.

On 22 November 2017, Papua New Guinea Police moved in to try to get the more than 350 men remaining in the centre to leave. By 23 November 2017, all remaining men had been removed, more than 300 by force, to new accommodation. Detainee Behrouz Boochani wrote of what was happening and of his fear during the siege that followed the closure, as well as the articles he wrote for The Guardian at the time, amongst other things, in WhatsApp messages to translator and friend Omid Tofighian, published in full online. The messages were eventually published in the book No Friend But the Mountains.

Twelve Australians of the Year protested the government's handling of the problem in November 2017. The United Nations High Commissioner for Refugees cited the centre as an "indictment of a policy meant to avoid Australia's international obligations."

=== 2018 ===
==== January: US resettlement ====
On 23 January 2018, a second group of 54 refugees left for the US.

==== May: Another death ====
After a long history of mental illness, 52-year-old Rohingya, Salim, died on 22 May 2018.

=== 2019 ===
==== February: "Medevac" bill ====
On 13 February 2019, a bill which became known as the "Medevac bill" was narrowly passed by the Australian parliament, allowing doctors to have more say in the process by which asylum seekers on Manus and Nauru may be brought to the mainland for treatment. The approval of two doctors is required, but approval may still be overridden by the home affairs minister in one of three areas. Human rights advocates hailed the decision, with one calling it a "tipping point as a country", with the weight of public opinion believing that sick people need treatment.

==== March: Court action against PNG govt ====
In March 2019, an action was launched in the Supreme Court of PNG by a group of asylum seekers who will argue that they are still being imprisoned, despite no longer being confined to the detention centre. Referring to the 2016 ruling by the Supreme Court that their detention was illegal, lawyer Ben Lomai said that the current situation, with no time frame given as to how long they will be there, amounts to detention. They will also be asking for the men to be given travel documents which will allow them to move around within the country and also overseas. At the moment they have to apply through an arduous process, cannot travel to other provinces and need permission to travel to Port Moresby or for any exceptions to the curfew which restricts them to the accommodation centres at night.

There was confusion about the application of Medevac bill. A Sri Lankan refugee reported that self-harm is a regular occurrence. Signs had gone up around the camp saying that any medical evacuations will be temporary only, that Christmas Island had been reopened and that none of them would ever settle in Australia. The unsigned notification was posted by Behrouz Boochani on Twitter.

==== June: Despair after election ====
After the Australian Liberal Party were (unexpectedly, according to polls) re-elected 2019 Australian federal election, reports of despair and attempted self-harm and suicide were reported from Manus. The men had hoped with Labor in government, the New Zealand offer would be accepted and they would at last be resettled. By 4 June there had been at least 26 attempts at suicide or self-harm by men in the Lorengau camps and Port Moresby (in the hospital and accommodation for sick asylum seekers). The PNG paramilitary police squad was deployed around one of the camps in an attempt to deter suicide and self-harm attempts. Lorengau general hospital has been handling many of the self-harm and suicide cases, despite the Australian government contract with Pacific International Health (PIH), because of the seriousness of the cases. The police commander commented that they were doing all they could, but severe mental illness arose because of the effect of long-term detention on the men.

In early June, prominent refugee and advocate Abdul Aziz Muhamat was granted asylum in Switzerland, four months after flying there to receive the Martin Ennals award (see below). He said that he said he would continue to speak out against the offshore processing policy and support the other men still in detention.

After escalating incidents of attempted suicide and self-harm (by 13 June Boochani had reported 50 on the island and in Port Moresby) Chief Inspector David Yapu of PNG police and the governor of the Manus Province, Charlie Benjamin, called for the Australian Government to step in and deal with the remaining men (more than 570 as of February). Benjamin said that he would be bringing up the matter with new prime minister James Marape.

From August onwards, men started to be transferred to Port Moresby, with some being flown to the US as part of the refugee swap and others being incarcerated in Bomana prison. Some of the men were moved into the Bomana Immigration Centre, a detention facility which is part of the Bomana prison complex, having to surrender their mobile phones beforehand. Shortly afterwards, the remaining asylum seekers were offered voluntary relocation to accommodation in Port Moresby by the PNG government.

The Australian government reported that as of 30 September total numbers of asylum seekers left in PNG and Nauru was 562 (23 percent of the peak, in June 2014), and another 1,117 people had been "temporarily transferred to Australia for medical treatment or as accompanying family members". Numbers for each facility were not given separately.

On 15 October, a 32-year-old Afghan refugee and doctor, Sayed Mirwais Rohani, jumped to his death from the 22nd floor of a Brisbane hotel, after suffering from acute mental distress. He had a medical degree recognised by Australia, completed in English, and spoke six languages. He had offered to work in the Lorengau hospital for free, and was moved out of the detention centre, but not allowed to work in the hospital. His parents were refugees in Britain and his father travelled to Manus in 2016 and 2018 to attempt to secure his son's release, but both attempts had failed.

==== November ====
On 14 November 2019, Boochani left Manus and travelled to New Zealand on a one-month visa to appear as guest speaker at a special event organised by WORD Christchurch on 29 November, as well as other speaking events. The US had technically accepted him as part of the "refugee swap" deal, but now that he had left PNG, he feared that his status was uncertain. Boochani feels a sense of duty towards the men he was forced to leave behind on PNG. He said that apart from those who have died, about three-quarters of the refugees and asylum seekers sent to Manus since 2012 had left, to Australia, the US or other countries. However he remained deeply concerned about those who were still trapped there, especially the 46 who are being held in Bomana prison in Port Moresby.

By mid-September only a handful of the peak total of 1500 men were left on Manus, after about 280 men had been transferred to Port Moresby. About 80 of them, housed in the Granville Motel, were being told to move into the community or have their allowances cut.

The Australian government, upon request by the PNG government, gave notices to Paladin and to NKW Holdings to terminate their services on 30 November 2019. All remaining men would be moved to Port Moresby, and thereafter managed by the PNG government.

New Zealand has repeatedly offered to accept 150 refugees per annum from the offshore detention centres, but Australia would not agree to this.

=== 2020: on mainland Australia ===
As of June 2020, over 100 men from Manus and Nauru were being detained in an hotel in Kangaroo Point in Brisbane, after being transferred to the mainland for medical treatment. They were confined to quarters under a lockdown during the COVID-19 pandemic, and legislation was introduced to parliament to remove mobile phones from refugees and asylum seekers in detention. The men held protests from their balconies, and protesters gathered outside on several occasions. The mobile phone legislation was not passed, and the 25 men were released into the community in February 2021.

=== October 2021: PNG takes over ===
In October 2021, the Australian Government cut off all support to the approximately 124 remaining men (Note: Most sources say 124, which was the official number on 31 July 2021.) in Papua New Guinea, leaving the PNG Government to take over responsibility for them. While the decision to end the offshore detention program was welcomed by Amnesty International and other human rights, refugee advocate groups and Boochani, the uncertainty of the men's futures and the way that the government had handed over responsibility to PNG was criticised. The remaining men have been told that their options are transferring to the Nauru Regional Processing Centre or resettling in PNG.

=== 2023–2024 ===
In late October 2023, the New Zealand Government confirmed it would resettle 39 former Manus Island refugees, who were part of the final group of refugees in Papua New Guinea.

In mid November 2023, Radio New Zealand reported that a group of former Manus Island refugees would lose access to a range of accommodation, health, welfare and immigration services due to non-payment by the Papua New Guinea Immigration and Citizenship Authority.

In mid September 2024, The Guardian Australia reported that about 91 people who had sought asylum in Australia (including 44 men, 17 partners and over 30 children) were facing eviction from their apartments in Port Moresby due to non-payment of their rent. Australian Greens immigration spokesperson David Shoebridge criticised the Albanese government for abandoning asylum seekers still stranded in Papua New Guinea and urged the Australian Government to resettle them in Australia. In response, the Australian Department of Home Affairs said that the PNG government, not the Australian government, was responsible for the welfare of these asylum seekers.

== Numbers ==
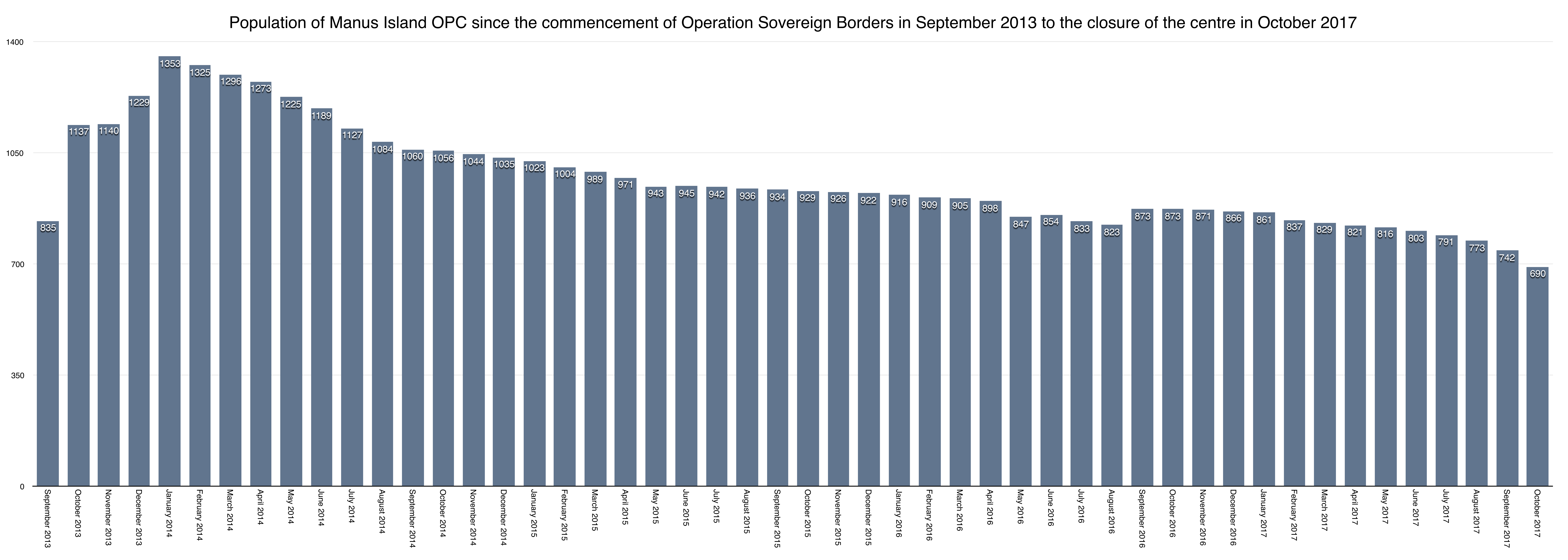
Chart of the centre's population at the end of each month since the commencement of Operation Sovereign Borders to October 2017.

As of 31 October 2017, there were 690 asylum seekers held in the processing centre. The highest population was 1,353 in January 2014. On 1 March 2017, it was reported that some were choosing to return to their countries of origin in response to offers of up to A$25,000 from the Australian government to leave voluntarily. The centre was closed formally on 31 October 2017, but hundreds of detainees refused to leave. On 23 November 2017, all remaining men at the centre were moved to new accommodation.

In February 2019, a Home Affairs spokesman said that there were 422 people housed at the three camps – 213 at East Lorengau, 111 at West Lorengau and 98 asylum seekers at Hillside Haus.

As of 28 August 2019, the government reported there were 306 people left in PNG, another 53 detained in PNG, and 279 from PNG had been resettled in the US so far.

In March 2020, Home Affairs told the Senate estimates committee that "211 refugees and asylum seekers remained on Nauru, 228 in Papua New Guinea, and about 1,220, including their dependents, were in Australia to receive medical treatment". Transfer and resettlement of approved refugees in the US was proceeding during the COVID-19 pandemic. 35 refugees left Port Moresby on 28 May 2020, and others would be flown from their places of detention within Australia, to be resettled in 18 US cities.

There were around 100–140 men remaining in October 2021, when responsibility for their welfare was taken over by PNG, after the rest had either been resettled in the United States or Canada, returned to their home countries, or been transferred to Australia.

=== Escapees ===
Jaivet Ealom is the only person to have escaped.

=== Deaths ===
The following men are known to have died:

- 15 October 2019 – Sayed Mirwais Rohani, 32 years old, Afghan. Suicide in Brisbane.
- 22 May 2018 – Salim, 52 years old, Rohingya. Supposed suicide, on Manus.
- 2 October 2017 – Rajeev Rajendran, 32 years old, Sri Lankan Tamil. Suspected suicide, on Manus.
- 7 August 2017 – Hamed Shamshiripour, 31 years old, Iranian. Suspected suicide.
- 24 December 2016 – Faysal Ishak Ahmed, 27 years old, Sudanese. Died after a seizure and fall in a Brisbane hospital.
- 2 August 2016 – Kamil Hussain, 34 years old, Pakistani. Drowned at a waterfall when out on a day trip on Manus.
- 5 September 2014 – Hamid Kehazaei, 24 years old, Iranian. Died in a Brisbane hospital after delayed medical help for sepsis followed by a heart attack in Port Moresby.
- 17 February 2014 – Reza Barati, 24 years old, Iranian. Murdered by two Manusian men who were convicted of murder in 2016.

== Contractor services controversies ==
=== Security and maintenance ===
==== Before Paladin ====
G4S was responsible for security on Manus for a six-month period leading up to the 2014 riot during which Reza Barati was killed. The two guards employed by this company who were allegedly partly responsible for Barati's death have never been brought to justice. The next contract was with Transfield (which afterwards changed its name to Broadspectrum after its founders withdrew its rights to use the name "Transfield", citing concerns over its management of offshore detention centres). They were responsible for providing food and welfare services; while the security company Wilson took over from G4S. Wilson played a major role in suppressing the January 2015 hunger strike undertaken by 800 refugees. In November 2017, after the closure of the detention centre, Broadspectrum and Wilson left Manus, at the beginning of the 23-day siege, leaving detainees without water and food.

==== Paladin ====
In January 2018 home affairs minister Peter Dutton refused an order from the Senate to release documents relating to the health, construction and security services for Manus. One of the contracts causing controversy was that signed with security firm Paladin Solutions, a group run by two Australians, which was earning AU$72m for providing security for four months (about AU$585,000 a day). There was at the time a dispute with a local security firm, Kingfisher, who thought that they should have been given the contract.

In February 2019, the Australian government extended its contract with Paladin, promising an extra $109 million, to provide maintenance and other services to the East Lorengau Transit Centre. This made the Paladin Group one of the biggest government contractors in Australia, at AU$423 million for its 22 months of work on Manus. Asylum seekers in the centre reported that maintenance was very poor, and a July 2018 report UNHCR noted below-standard facilities, leaking pipes and showers not working in East Lorengau, although there had been improvements in the other camps. It was reported that the government had not run an open tender process for contracts worth AU$423 million to provide security for the asylum seekers, and further that Paladin had left a number of bad debts and failed contracts across Asia and had moved ownership of its Australian entity from Hong Kong to Singapore. Peter Dutton sought to distance himself, saying that he had "no sight" of the tender process. The Australian Financial Review calculated that the daily cost per detainee of the service was more than double the rate for a suite in a 5-star hotel with views of Sydney Harbour.

Asylum seekers on Manus said that Paladin staff appeared to do little but check IDs and sit at the front gate, with mostly poorly paid local staff working at the centre and security issues being attended to by PNG police. On 18 February 2019, the PNG government, which had had no involvement in awarding the contract, signalled an intention to raise concerns about Paladin with the Australian government. The PNG immigration minister confirmed that they had cancelled the visa of one of Paladin's directors for using local labour, as per the government's stated position. Australian Home Affairs Secretary, Michael Pezzullo, said that the tender had required a tight turnaround after PNG unexpectedly withdrew its provision of service in July. Pezzullo said he would have preferred to use an open tender.

On 26 February 2019, local employees of Paladin went on strike, saying that they were now being treated unfairly, being underpaid (at A$2-A$3 an hour) with no overtime paid for shifts of up to 12 hours, and that those who had worked for previous contractor Broadspectrum had had their pay cut. In addition, none of them had job security.

Paladin's services were terminated on 30 November 2019.

=== Support workers ===
JDA Wokman, now known as Applus Wokman, is contracted to help the former detainees settle and access health and other services in PNG. Paradise Health Solutions, a PNG company half-owned by Australian business Aspen Medical was subcontracted to JDA to provide Australian staff to support the local case workers. In May 2019, former employees of Paradise reported that they were asked to falsify records for an Australian government audit. Workers were asked to write reports for clients they had not seen, compromising their professional integrity, and there were also complaints about outstanding pay, poor staff treatment, and workplace conditions. The workers believed that the A$44m paid for the contract was not being wisely spent.

== Human rights issues ==
According to PEN International, "Manus Island has become notorious for its ill-treatment of detainees where violence, sexual abuse and self-harm are reportedly common".

=== Secrecy provisions in law ===
In 2014 the National Security Legislation Amendment Act (No. 1) made it a crime, punishable with up to a 10-year prison sentence, to disclose any special intelligence operation, including relating to asylum seekers. This provided little protection to journalists seeking to report on information from whistle-blowers. It caused professional journalists as well as teachers, and health professionals employed in these detention centres, to be silenced. Journalists were prevented from entering or reporting and staff members were gagged under draconian employment contracts that prevented them from speaking about anything happening in Australia's offshore detention centre, under threat of a prison sentence.

The Secrecy and Disclosure Provisions of the 1 July 2015 Australian Border Force Act ruled that workers who spoke of any incidents from within one of the centres would receive a 2-year prison sentence. This was later watered down in amendments put forward by Peter Dutton in August 2017, after doctors and other health professionals had mounted a high court challenge. The amendments would apply retrospectively and stipulated that the secrecy provision would only apply to information that could compromise Australia's security, defence or international relations, interfere with criminal investigations offences, or affect sensitive personal or commercial matters.

=== Human rights defenders win awards ===
Two voices have been prominent amongst detainees in publicising the plight of the asylum seekers from the island itself: Iranian journalist Behrouz Boochani and Zaghawa Sudanese man Abdul Aziz Muhamat, also known as Aziz.

Boochani won a top Australian literary award for his novel No Friend But the Mountains: Writing from Manus Prison in January 2019.

On 13 February 2019, Aziz won the 2019 Martin Ennals Award for Human Rights Defenders, which is given to human rights defenders who show deep commitment to their work at great personal risk; it also helps to provide protection through increased international recognition for the winner. He was allowed to travel to Geneva in Switzerland to accept the award. Aziz spoke to international media and tweeted regularly from the island, shedding light on the what life was like for those in offshore detention. He sent about 4,000 voice messages chronicling his experiences for the award-winning Guardian Australia-published podcast The Messenger.

Aziz was a community leader for the Sudanese detainees on Manus. He participated in the 2015 hunger strike and was taken to the Lorengau jail (as was Boochani), where he was held without charge. He helped to prepare other detainees' legal challenges to their ongoing detention in Australian and PNG courts. He also spoke out about the conditions in the centre with news outlets such as CNN, Al Jazeera, and The Guardian. He advocated for humane living conditions and adequate medical care. He was one of the leaders of the peaceful resistance to being removed from the centre when it was closed.

He was granted refugee status in 2015, but it wasn't until June 2019 that a third country, Switzerland, granted asylum to Aziz.

== In the arts ==
Chauka, Please Tell Us the Time is a documentary film co-directed by Boochani and Netherlands-based Iranian filmmaker Arash Kamali Sarvestani released in 2017. It was shot by Boochani from inside the detention centre. The whole film was shot over six months on a smartphone, which had to be kept secret from the prison authorities.

The virtual reality project Inside Manus, commissioned by SBS VR and directed by Lucas Taylor, premiered at the Melbourne International Film Festival in 2017. It also screened at the Cannes Film Festival, and won the SPAA award for best interactive production. The film features the stories of asylum seekers Abdul Aziz Muhamat, Amir Taghinia, and Imran Mohammad.

Boochani's award-winning memoir, No Friend But the Mountains: Writing from Manus Prison (2018), is an autobiographical account of his perilous journey from Indonesia to Christmas Island and thence to Manus, and tells of what life is like for the detained men.

Boochani also collaborated with Iranian-born Melbourne photographer Hoda Afshar on a two-channel video work, Remain, which includes spoken poetry by him and Iranian poet Bijan Elahi. Afshar describes her method as "staged documentary", in which the men on the island are able to "re-enact their narratives with their own bodies and [gives] them autonomy to narrate their own stories." The video was shown as part of the Primavera 2018 exhibition at the Museum of Contemporary Art Australia in Sydney, from 9 November 2018 to 3 February 2019. Both Afshar and Boochani believe that art can hit home in a more powerful way, after the public has become immune to images of and journalism about suffering.

A photograph taken by Afshar entitled "Portrait of Behrouz Boochani, Manus Island" as part of her work for Remain was awarded the prestigious William and Winifred Bowness Photography Prize by the Monash Gallery of Art in October 2018, as well as the Australia People's Choice Award. The photograph was described as having "immense visual, political and emotional presence". The subject of the photograph sees in it "an image of a human being that has been stripped of his identity, personhood and humanity...degraded by other human beings, tortured and deprived of all his human rights".

The play Manus, written by Iranian playwright Nazanin Sahamizadeh in 2017, tells the story of eight Iranians, including Boochani, who fled Iran for Australia and were detained on Manus. It relates some of the stories of their lives in Iran, their trip in leaky boats from Indonesia and their experiences in detention, including details of the 2014 riot and killing of Reza Barati. It was performed in Tehran in February–March 2017, running for a month in the Qashqai Hall of the City Theatre Complex and attended by nearly 3000 people, including Abbas Araghchi, Iran's deputy foreign minister, and Australian diplomats. It was also performed in two cities in Bangladesh in October 2017, at the Chittagong Shilpakala Academy in Chittagong and in Dhaka. The playwright Sahamizadeh said it was performed there as a part of its international tour to express compassion and solidarity with Rohingya refugees from Myanmar who had sought protection in Bangladesh recently. It was directed by the author and produced by the Tehran-based Verbatim Theatre Group at the Adelaide Festival in March 2019.

In 2018 an ex-soldier and former security guard for G4S, writing under the pseudonym Michael Coates, published a book entitled Manus Days: The Untold Story of Manus Island, published by Connor Court Publishing and with a foreword written by Miranda Devine. The author writes about ethnic tensions, claiming that the unrest was mostly fomented by Iranian detainees, and of the violent riots of 2014 (in which two security guards were implicated but never brought to justice in the murder of Reza Barati), when he was working as a member of the Emergency Response Team.

Kurdish asylum seeker Farhad Bandesh finds spiritual escape in art and music. He has written a song entitled "The Big Exhale" and released a video (made with the collaboration of Melbourne City Ballet) on YouTube and audio on Wantok Music in June 2019. Australian musicians David Bridie and Jenell Quinsee helped to write and record it.

A short (13-minute) documentary film entitled Manus made by artist and refugee advocate Angus McDonald was released in 2019, about the stand-off when the facility was closed at the end of 2017. The film was shot by Australian journalist Olivia Rousset, and used only clips from interviews with the men to create the narrative, ending with Boochani narrating his "Manus Poem" in Farsi. It was selected for several Australian and international film awards in 2019 and 2020, winning Best Documentary at the 2019 St. Kilda Film Festival and at the 2020 FIFO (Festival International du Film Documentaire Océanien) in Tahiti.

Rohingya refugee Jaivet Ealom, the only person to escape from the detention centre, wrote of his escape and finding refuge in Canada in Escape From Manus, published by Penguin Books in July 2021.

== See also ==
- Asylum in Australia
- Australian immigration detention facilities
- List of Australian immigration detention facilities
- NZYQ v Minister for Immigration - High Court ruling preventing infinite detention if there is no prospect of release in the foreseeable future
- Immigrant health in Australia

== Images relating to Manus ==
- Media related to Manus Island Detention Centre at Wikimedia Commons
