= Francis Schüssler Fiorenza =

American theologian (1941–2025)

Francis Schüssler Fiorenza (1941 – July 2025) was an American theologian who held the post of Charles Chancey Stillman Research Professor of Roman Catholic Theological Studies at Harvard Divinity School.

== Biography ==
Born Francis Fiorenza in 1941, as a young man he entered St. Mary's Seminary and University in Baltimore, Maryland, from which he earned the degree of Master of Divinity, even though he did not intend to pursue ordination. In 1963, he won a fellowship to study theology in Germany under the Jesuit theologian Karl Rahner at LMU Munich. Because that university would not accept doctoral candidates to work under Rahner, he instead enrolled at the University of Münster, where he eventually obtained the degree of Doctor of Theology, having studied under Johann Baptist Metz and Joseph Ratzinger (the future Pope Benedict XVI). It was while studying there that he met his future wife, Elisabeth Schüssler Fiorenza, a feminist Catholic theologian. Rahner transferred to Münster two years later, so he was able to accomplish his original goal.

Now Francis Schüssler Fiorenza as a result of his marriage, he returned to the United States with his wife, where they obtained teaching positions at the University of Notre Dame in Indiana. After that, he taught at Villanova University in Pennsylvania, and the Catholic University of America in Washington, D.C.

In 1986, Fiorenza joined the faculty of the Harvard Divinity School, where his wife also became a professor. In 2021, he retired from active teaching duties and became a research professor. His primary interests were in the fields of fundamental or foundational theology, in which he explored the significance of contemporary hermeneutical theories as well as neo-pragmatic criticisms of foundationalism. His writings on political theology engaged recent theories of justice, especially those of John Rawls and Jürgen Habermas, and dealt with issues of work and welfare. He also wrote on the history of 19th- and 20th-century theology, focusing on both Roman Catholic and Protestant theologians.

Fiorenza was awarded the Henry Luce III Fellowship for 2005-06 for research in the history of 20th-century Roman Catholic theology, namely, the direction known as the nouvelle théologie ("new theology"). This was a school of thought which originated at the Jesuit seminary of Lyon, France, and the work of the Jesuit theologian Henri de Lubac, and which sought to explore a perspective in theology from the earlier roots of the Church, prior to Scholasticism and the theology of the Council of Trent.

Foundational Theology: Jesus and the Church is one of his earliest and best-known books. He has published widely, with more than 150 essays in the areas of fundamental theology, hermeneutics, and political theology, as well as several other books.

Fiorenza died on July 23, 2025.

== Works ==
- Foundational Theology: Jesus and the Church (Crossroad Publishing Company, 1984) ISBN 978-0824504946
- Systematic Theology, volumes 1 and 2 (Fortress Press, 1991)
- Modern Christian Thought: The Twentieth Century James C. Livingston and Francis Schüssler Fiorenza, 2nd edition (Fortress Press, 2006) ISBN 978-0800637965
- Systematic Theology: Roman Catholic Perspectives, Francis Schüssler Fiorenza and John P. Galvin, editors, 2nd edition (Fortress Press, 2011) ISBN 978-0800662912
- Rights at Risk: Confronting the Cultural, Ethical, and Religious Challenges (Continuum, 2012) ISBN 978-0826428141
- Political Theology: Contemporary Challenges and Future Directions Francis Schüssler Fiorenza, Klaus Tanner and Michael Welker, editors (Westminster John Knox Press, 2013) ISBN 978-0664259754
