= Feminist Party of Canada =

Canadian political party

The Feminist Party of Canada (F.P.C.) was founded in 1979.

The party was launched at the Ontario Institute for Studies in Education on 10 June 1979. Mary O'Brien and Angela Miles were keynote speakers at the launch event.

The Feminist Party of Canada emerged from a series of meetings held in the early months of 1979. Its formation was driven by the goal of enhancing women's involvement in the political system. The F.P.C. describes itself as "an integral part of the Women's Movement, with our policies, processes, and organizational structure reflecting the values and objectives of that movement." The F.P.C. asserts that, historically, women have been placed in a subordinate position. Women have carried the responsibility of making communities more humane. Since the political system is the mechanism through which members of a community—and by extension, society—are safeguarded, women must have a role in politics. If they are not adequately represented, it is incumbent upon women to enact the necessary changes.
