= No friends but the mountains =

Kurdish proverb

"No friends but the mountains" (Kurdish: Ji çiyan pê ve tu heval nînin; Sorani Kurdish: ھیچ دۆستێک جگە لە چیاکان) is a Kurdish proverb which is expressed to signify their feeling of betrayal, abandonment and loneliness due to their history as a semi-stateless ethnic minority in the Middle East without faithful allies.

The saying was widely referenced following the withdrawal of US troops stationed in north-eastern Syria and the subsequent Turkish offensive into the region. Invoking the proverb, British YPG volunteer Azad Cudi said that "the United States, like any other state or any other government, will do whatever serves their own best interests". He also said that despite a lack of allies or equipment to repel the offensive, the SDF would "fight back at all costs". The phrase has also been used to reflect on previous feelings of betrayal by the United States, specifically the Reagan administration's tolerance of the Anfal campaign against Iraqi Kurds in 1988 and the Trump administration's non-recognition of the Kurdistan Region independence referendum in 2017.

== See also ==
- No Friend But the Mountains, memoir by Kurdish writer Behrouz Boochani
