= Reza Barati =

Asylum seeker murdered in Australian detention

Reza Barati was a 23-year-old asylum seeker who was killed during an orchestrated attack on inmates at the Manus Island Regional Processing Centre (MIRPC), Papua New Guinea, on 17 February 2014. An Iranian Kurd, he had arrived in Australia on 24 July 2013 – just five days after the PNG solution was announced – and was sent to Manus Island in August.

It was first reported that the cause of death was "severe head trauma", with the Cornall Review later concluding that the actual cause was cardiac arrest as a consequence of "severe brain injury", caused by being beaten by several assailants. Two Manusian men were convicted of murder in 2016, but others involved, said to be Australian expats, have never been brought to justice.

== Barati's life ==
Reza was born in a small town called Lomar in Ilam Province, part of the Kurdistan region of Iran, in 1990. He studied architecture at university and was determined to finish his studies when resettled. Due to his nature and large build, his friends called him "the gentle giant".

== Government and public reaction in Australia ==
Then Immigration Minister Scott Morrison said after the incident that Barati's body would be moved to Port Moresby, where an autopsy would be held before the government would assist with repatriation to Iran, as requested by his family.

At least 15,000 people attended 600 snap protests in Australia following the news of his death. Over 4,000 Australians came together in Sydney Town Hall on 23 February 2014 to hold a candlelight vigil in memory of Barati.

== Cornall Review and Senate enquiry ==
Robert Cornall, a lawyer and former Secretary of the Attorney-General's Department, was appointed in February 2014 to conduct "a review into the circumstances surrounding the Manus Island disturbances" leading up to Reza Barati's death, with the primary focus on management of security at the centre.

The report was released in late May 2014. In the report, Cornall described Barati as "a very gentle man" who was not involved in the unrest. The report concluded that "Mr Barati suffered a severe brain injury caused by a brutal beating by several assailants and died a few hours later."

In December 2014, an Australian Senate inquiry into the three days of rioting at the centre found the Australian Government had failed in its duty to protect asylum seekers and that the riots were both caused by a failure to process asylum claims and foreseeable.

== Arrests and trial ==
In July 2014, a security guard and later a Salvation Army worker, both Papua-New Guinean, were arrested. Both men were charged with murder. Their trial at Manus Island court was due to start on 2 March 2015. Three more suspects were being sought, two of whom were Australian expatriate security guards who as of 11 February 2019 had still not been charged.

On 19 March 2016, the two 29-year-old Papuan men, Louie Efi and Joshua Kaluvia, were convicted in the Supreme Court of Papua New Guinea and each sentenced to 10 years jail for Reza Barati's murder. Kaluvia had hit Barati with a piece of timber spiked with nails and Efi had dropped a rock on his head. Five years of the sentences were suspended, and credit was given for time served.

In sentencing, Justice Nicholas Kirriwom said they had received shorter prison terms because others not yet charged were also involved in killing Barati, and that the prosecution's case relied on the evidence of one main witness. This witness had reported that a large group of people including New Zealand and Australian guards were involved in attacking Barati. Both accused pleaded not guilty and maintained their innocence throughout, claiming to have been set up. The apparent exemption from justice of expatriates working on Manus had long been alleged by Manusians, suggesting double standards of justice.

In July 2020, the Australian government and security company G4S settled a lawsuit brought against them by former Manus Island security officer Grant Potter. Potter claimed he was left with severe psychological injuries after riots at the Manus Island detention facility in 2014 resulted in one asylum seeker dead and 77 people injured.

== Eyewitness account in film ==
The documentary film Chauka, Please Tell Us the Time, shot from inside the detention centre by fellow refugee Behrouz Boochani, contains a first-hand account of Barati's death.
