= Elisabeth Schüssler Fiorenza =

German-American Catholic theologian (born 1938)

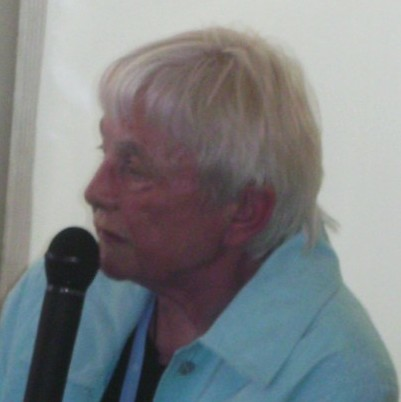
- Schüssler-Fiorenza in 2008
- Born: Elisabeth Schüssler; April 17, 1938 (age 88); Cenad, Romania
- Spouse: Francis Schüssler Fiorenza (m. 1967): d.2025

Academic background
- Education: University of Würzburg; University of Münster
- Doctoral advisor: Joachim Gnilka; Rudolf Schnackenburg

Academic work
- Discipline: Theology
- School or tradition: Christian feminism; Roman Catholicism
- Institutions: University of Notre Dame; Episcopal Divinity School; Harvard University
- Notable works: In Memory of Her (1983)
- Notable ideas: Kyriarchy
- Website: projects.iq.harvard.edu/elisabethschusslerfiorenza

Elisabeth Schüssler Fiorenza (April 17, 1938) is a Romanian-born German, Roman Catholic feminist theologian, who was the Krister Stendahl Research Professor of Divinity at Harvard Divinity School.

== Life ==
Elisabeth Schüssler was born on April 17, 1938, in Cenad, a locality in the Banat region of the Kingdom of Romania, where she belonged to the Banat Swabian German-speaking Catholic population of an ethnically mixed community. As the Russian army advanced through Romania in late 1944, she and her parents fled to southern Germany. They subsequently moved to Frankfurt, where she attended local schools. She then received her Theologicum (Licentiate of Sacred Theology) from the University of Würzburg in 1963, her thesis published in German as Der vergessene Partner (The Forgotten Partner) in 1964. She subsequently earned a Doctor of Sacred Theology degree from the University of Münster. In 1967 she married Francis Schüssler Fiorenza, an American theologian who was studying in Germany. In 1970 they both secured teaching appointments at the Catholic University of Notre Dame. While at Notre Dame, they had their daughter, Christina. Schüssler Fiorenza then taught at the Episcopal Divinity School in Cambridge, Massachusetts.

In 1984 Schüssler Fiorenza, along with 96 other theologians and religious persons, signed A Catholic Statement on Pluralism and Abortion, calling for religious pluralism and discussion within the Catholic Church regarding the church's position on abortion. In 1995 the Faculty of Theology at Uppsala University in Sweden awarded Schüssler Fiorenza an honorary doctorate.

Schüssler Fiorenza identifies as Catholic and her work is generally in the context of Christianity, although much of her work has broader applicability.

== Work ==
Schüssler Fiorenza subsequently became a co-founder of the Journal of Feminist Studies in Religion (of which she is still editor). She was then appointed as the first Krister Stendahl Research Professor of Divinity at Harvard Divinity School. Her late husband, Francis Schüssler Fiorenza, was also a Professor of Roman Catholic Studies at the same institution.

Schüssler Fiorenza has served on the board of editors of Concilium and is a past associate editor of the Catholic Biblical Quarterly. She was elected a member of the Catholic Biblical Association in 1971, was the first woman elected president of the Society of Biblical Literature (1987), and was elected to the American Academy of Arts and Sciences in 2001.

In Memory of Her: A Feminist Theological Reconstruction of Christian Origins is one of Schüssler Fiorenza's earliest and best-known books. This work, which argued for the retrieval of the overlooked contributions of women in the early Christian church, set a high standard for historical rigor in feminist theology. Additionally, she has published widely in journals and anthologies.

Schüssler Fiorenza has been credited for coining the word kyriarchy in her book But She Said: Feminist Practices of Biblical Interpretation.

=== In Memory of Her and Paul the Apostle ===
In the reconstruction of early Christianity in In Memory of Her, Schüssler Fiorenza discusses Saint Paul at great length. She explores his epistles as well as the narrative of his ministry in the Acts of the Apostles. Some see the relationship between Paul the Apostle and women as misogynistic, pointing to controversial passages about women's subordination, their necessary silence in church, and more. Schüssler Fiorenza rejects this notion and delves deeper into the stories to find the true Paul and his relationship with women.

She discusses the many encounters Paul has with women throughout the canon and in apocryphal works, noting that throughout, Paul saw the women as equals both as people and in ministry. Particular attention is spent on the Acts of Paul and Thecla, a story that, despite having Paul's name in the title, is primarily about the holiness and ministry of his extraordinary female companion.

To home in on the source of this reconstruction of gender equality, Schüssler Fiorenza turns to one of Paul's core theological verses, Galatians 3:28: "There is no longer Jew or Greek, there is no longer slave or free, there is no longer male and female; for all of you are one in Christ Jesus." Schüssler Fiorenza sees this statement as "a key expression . . . of the theological self-understanding of the Christian missionary movement which had far-reaching historical impact." It also combatted the Gnostic understanding that "becoming a disciple means for a woman becoming ‘male,’ ‘like man,’ and relinquishing her sexual powers of procreation, because the male principle stands for the heavenly, angelic, divine realm, whereas the female principle represents either human weakness or evil." In Paul's Christian communities, women did not have to become like men to be holier; they simply had to follow Christ. From Schüssler Fiorenza's perspective, this declaration in Galatians is a confirmation of the legitimacy of, among other marginalized populations, women in ministry.

She also discusses the household codes found in Colossians 3:18–4:1 and 1 Peter 2:11–3:12, as well as what can be pieced together from Ephesians. She asserts that the households and the "church" housed in them would have originally been spaces of gender equality but as Christianity grew and faced increased pressures to conform to the Greco-Roman culture, sexism would have started to creep in. Coequal roles in ministry, like the early office of bishop, were considered to be "socially volatile [situations]." This, combined with a desire to take church power out of the hands of wealthy women, led to the introduction of patriarchy to the Pauline church.

While the oft-quoted misogynistic restrictions and verses were a part of Paul's epistles in some form, Schüssler Fiorenza insists that they existed to help ease tensions between the fledgling church and the surrounding culture, as well as ward off the perception of being a cult. However, post-Pauline and pseudo-Pauline communities “[drew] out these restrictions in order to change the equality in Christ between women and men . . . into a relationship of subordination.”

=== But She Said: Feminist Practices of Biblical Interpretation ===
Schüssler Fiorenza's work But She Said is both an expansion of her earlier works as well as a venture into developing feminist biblical interpretations. By this endeavor, Schüssler Fiorenza seeks to tend a feminist practice of interpreting biblical texts in ways that aid women's struggles for freedom and to create space for this re-seeing of biblical texts to occur. Key to Schüssler Fiorenza's goal is the deconstruction of a limiting theology that dominates the landscape of biblical interpretation. More than merely naming the patriarchal disposition of traditional, limited biblical ideologies, she exposes their elitist, racist and classist nature, thus identifying them as kyriarchal (master-headed). By pointing out the flaws of this limited perspective, she purposes that the kyriarchal biases of past interpreters may not be passed down into contemporary biblical discourse. Schüssler Fiorenza furthers this purpose by engaging in conversations with feminist theories and the process of biblical interpretation. A key element of Schüssler Fiorenza's contribution to biblical interpretation from this book is the presentation of interpretation as a spiraling dance. Schüssler Fiorenza uses the analogy of a dance to portray her approach, including feminist strategies of biblical interpretation and rhetoric of liberation, since interpretation is not accomplished in a purely linear fashion but, rather, consists of strategies that must be repeated much like the steps of a dance. Rejecting claims to objectivity and neutrality, Fiorenza's approach to biblical interpretation highlights the social and historical positions of both the reader and text, thus recognizing that all readings of texts, throughout history, are influenced by different perspectives and interests.

In the latter section of her work, Schüssler Fiorenza articulates a vision for a community by which a feminist reading of the bible can take place. This ekklesia of women should be upheld by radical equality and be a space by which feminist struggles for transforming societal and religious institutions can become realized. As a theoretical and real community of biblical interpreters, the ekklesia (Note: Ecclesia, or the alternative ekklesia, is from the Greek: ἐκκλησία, 'called out', originally applied to citizen assemblies in the city-states of Ancient Greece, where attendees were summoned to the meeting from their homes and daily life. From this it became a term for regular assemblies or convocations of any kind, especially when membership or attendance was invited, or "called out". Ekklesia was used in the Greek Septuagint of the Hebrew Bible to translate qahal, a politico-religious assembly of the ancient Israelites. In New Testament translations, use of the Greek ekklesia is given in English as "church". It has come to be used in several senses: as a general term for the church as a whole; for specific congregations; or for assemblies of church members for a special purpose, depending on context.) is a structure that pushes against interpretations that have led to domination. The ekklesia of women is a place marked by plurality, critical reflection and a commitment to liberation.

== Published works ==
- Der vergessene Partner: Grundlagen, Tatsachen und Möglichkeiten der beruflichen Mitarbeit der Frau in der Heilssorge der Kirche (1964)
- Priester für Gott: Studien zum Herrschafts- und Priestermotiv in der Apokalypse, NTA NF 7 (1972)
- The Apocalypse (1976)
- Hebrews, James, 1 and 2 Peter, Jude, Revelation. Proclamation Commentaries together with Fuller, Sloyan, Krodel, Danker (1977 /1981)
- Invitation to the Book of Revelation: A Commentary on the Apocalypse with Complete Text from the Jerusalem Bible (1981)
- Lent. Proclamation II: Aids for Interpreting the Lessons of the Church Year. Series B, [together with Urban T. Holmes] (1981)
- In Memory of Her: A Feminist Theological Reconstruction of Christian Origins (1983)
- Bread Not Stone: The Challenge of Feminist Biblical Interpretation (1985)
- Revelation: Vision of a Just World (1991)
- But She Said: Feminist Practices of Biblical Interpretation (1992)
- Discipleship of Equals: A Critical Feminist Ekklesialogy Of Liberation (1993)
- Jesus: Miriam's Child, Sophia's Prophet: Critical Issues in Feminist Christology (1994)
- The Power of Naming (1996)
- Sharing Her Word: Feminist Biblical Interpretation in Context (1998)
- Rhetoric and Ethic: The Politics of Biblical Studies (1999)
- Jesus and the Politics of Interpretation (2000)
- Wisdom Ways: Introducing Feminist Biblical Interpretation (2001)
- The ninth chapter of Transforming the Faiths of our Fathers: Women who Changed American Religion, edited by Ann Braude. (2004)
- The Power of the Word: Scripture and the Rhetoric of Empire (2007)
- The Transforming Vision: Explorations in Feminist The*logy (2011)
- "Changing the Paradigms: Toward a Feminist Future of the Biblical Past." In Future of the Biblical Past, 289–305. Atlanta: Society of Biblical Literature, 2012.
- Changing Horizons: Explorations in Feminist Interpretation (2013)

== Notes ==
Professional and academic associations
Preceded by James L. Mays	President of the Society of Biblical Literature; 1987	Succeeded by Philip King
