= WORD Christchurch =

Literary organisation in New Zealand

WORD Christchurch is an organisation based in Christchurch, New Zealand which presents a variety of events around books, stories and ideas, most notably the annual WORD Christchurch Festival, also known as WORD Festival, established in 1997, then known as Books and Beyond. Until 2014, the festival was run as the Press Christchurch Writers Festival.

== About the festival ==
The WORD Christchurch festival is an event for books, stories and ideas in the South Island of New Zealand. As of 2023 its Executive Director is Steph Walker and Kiran Dass is Programme Director. Rachael King was the literary director between 2013 and 2021. Nic Low was Programme Director in 2021 and 2022.

The Ngaio Marsh Awards are presented at the festival.

Until 2021, the festival was biennial. In the Festival off-year, WORD Christchurch partnered with the Christchurch Arts Festival for a series of ideas-based events, and also presented events at KidsFest in those years. It also ran an annual schools programme showcasing the New Zealand Children's Book Award finalists.

== History ==
The Festival has run under the WORD umbrella since 2014 but was established in 1997 by Morrin Rout and Ruth Todd; its predecessor was the Press Christchurch Writers Festival.

The 2018 event featured Australian writer and adventurer Robyn Davidson, former Islamist radical turned anti-extremist Ed Husain, Australian author, poet and hip-hop artist Omar Musa, British author Juno Dawson, New Zealand politician Margaret Austin, author and illustrator Gavin Bishop and many others. On 29 November 2019 a special event was held featuring Behrouz Boochani, the award-winning Iranian-Kurdish writer and film-maker who wrote about and filmed his experiences in the Australian offshore detention camp, the Manus Island detention centre, where he was held for six years.

In September 2020, the festival was local and focussed on New Zealand writing, as the COVID-19 travel bans in New Zealand made it difficult for international authors to attend. In 2021, the festival was postponed from September to November and its programme had to be downsized, with many events being run as virtual or live-streamed, due to the ongoing impacts of the pandemic.

The 2023 WORD Christchurch Festival is scheduled to take place from 23 to 27 August. The programme includes authors from New Zealand and overseas.
