= Angus McDonald (artist) =

Australian artist and filmmaker (born 1961)

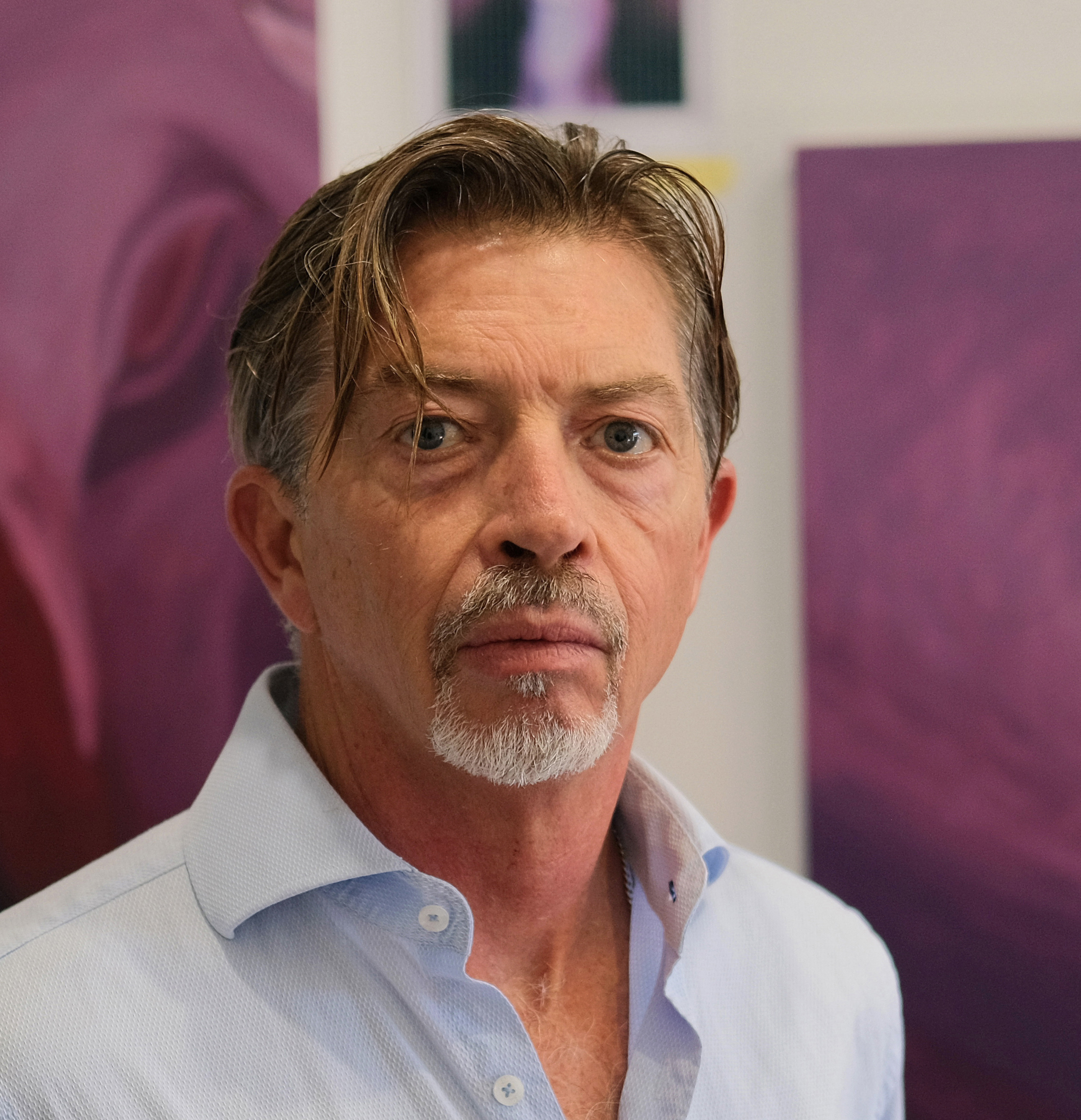
Angus McDonald

Angus McDonald (born 1961) is an Australian contemporary visual artist, refugee advocate, columnist, and documentary filmmaker.

== Early life and education ==
Angus McDonald was born in Sydney in 1961. He earned an Economics degree at the University of Sydney, and later (1993–5) studied painting at the Julian Ashton Art School in Sydney. He travelled to the small island of Leros, Greece and lived and painted there from 1996 to 1999.

In 2000, he was accepted as a student at the Florence Academy of Fine Arts in Italy. Upon his return to Australia in 2001, he settled in the Lennox Head region in New South Wales. In 2003, he settled in Lennox Head itself.

== Art ==
McDonald was a visual artist, mainly a painter (although he didn't use a paintbrush until he was 31), for around 25 years before he started making films, from around 2017.

His works have been avidly collected and exhibited internationally, including a 2007 London exhibition which showed his work after painting an Antarctic expedition with the Mawson's Huts expedition. He returned to Antarctica in 2008 and 2009 as an artist in residence for Aurora Expeditions. He is renowned for his landscapes and still life paintings.

=== Archibald Prize finalist ===
McDonald's portraits have been finalists for the Archibald Prize art competition seven times.

- In 2009, McDonald painted artist Zoe MacDonell
- In 2011, he painted Ann Lewis
- In 2012, McDonald entered a portrait of artist Tim Maguire
- In 2015, a portrait by McDonald of singer Abbe May was a finalist
- In 2019, he painted lawyer, writer, and former refugee Mariam Veiszadeh
- In 2020, McDonald's portrait of Kurdish Iranian writer and journalist and former Manus refugee, Behrouz Boochani, was selected for the People's Choice Award
- In 2024, he painted Marcia Langton

== Film and social advocacy ==
In 2016, McDonald became interested in human rights and refugee issues after travelling across the Greek islands (including Leros, where he had lived a couple of decades earlier) to see how the local communities dealt with the huge numbers of asylum seekers who had arrived in 2015 and 2016 via the Mediterranean Sea, mainly from Syria via Turkey. He was struck by the more humane way that the Greeks treated these huge numbers of migrants, compared with the Australian Government's treatment of the relatively few who had arrived by boat in Australian territorial waters.

McDonald established a social justice project called Howling Eagle, which advocates for humane treatment and raises public awareness of asylum seekers. The project began releasing videos on YouTube in 2018 under the title "Philoxenia", which is Greek for "extending hospitality and friendship to the stranger".

McDonald was ambassador for World Vision's KidsOffNauru Campaign and is on the Sydney Committee for Human Rights Watch Australia and Asia.

=== Manus ===
In 2019, McDonald's 13-minute short film Manus was released. It details the stand-off between the asylum seekers in the Manus Island detention centre and the authorities, which occurred at the end of 2017 around the time the detention facility was closed. In total, asylum seekers were held in the Manus Island detention centre for six years. The film was shot by Australian journalist Olivia Rousset and uses only clips from interviews with the men to create the narrative. It includes a poem called "Manus Poem" written and narrated in Farsi by Behrouz Boochani, a prominent Kurdish Iranian former asylum seeker held on Manus Island.

Manus was awarded Best Documentary at the 2019 St. Kilda Film Festival and Best Documentary at the 2020 FIFO (Festival International du Film Documentaire Océanien) in Tahiti. It was an official selection for the 2020 Byron Bay International Film Festival and the 2020 Aesthetica Short Film Festival (ASFFest) in York, England, qualifying the film for entry into the 2020 Oscars Documentary Short category by the Academy of Motion Picture Arts & Sciences.

== Writing ==
In 2020, McDonald began writing a weekly social commentary column for the Northern Rivers Review.
