= Mary O'Brien (philosopher) =

Feminist philosopher and professor (1926–1998)

- Born: Mary Mamie O'Brien; 8 July 1926; Walmer, Kent, England
- Died: 17 October 1998 (aged 72); Toronto, Canada
- Occupations: Philosopher; professor
- Notable work: The Politics of Reproduction (1981)
- Partner: Catherine McNaughton

Mary Mamie O'Brien (8 July 1926 – 17 October 1998) was a feminist philosopher and professor. She taught sociology and feminist social theory in Canada until her death. She was a founding member of the Feminist Party of Canada.

== Life ==
Mary Mamie O'Brien was born on 8 July 1926 in Walmer, Kent. Unable to take care of her children, her mother took Mary and her brother to Glasgow at the age of four, where they were raised by three aunts. According to The Women's Review of Books obituary, "Mary always said she was English by birth, Irish by name and Scottish by choice; later, she became a Canadian by choice."

After encountering the Fabian Society she was impressed by Beatrice Webb and joined the Labour Party as a teenager. She was a keen activist in the Labour Party but found her idealism shattered by the twin events of 1956: the Suez Crisis and the Soviet invasion of Hungary. However, her experience as a midwife in the industrial slums of Clydeside was to provide her with a sceptical outlook which she exhibited in her later philosophical work.

O'Brien emigrated to Canada in 1957, where she first worked as a nurse and then completed graduate work in political philosophy.

O'Brien died on 19 October 1998 in her sleep from a heart attack at the age of 72 after a long struggle with Alzheimer's disease.

== The Politics of Reproduction ==
O'Brien wrote The Politics of Reproduction (1981), an important book in the development of feminist political theory. Starting from a Marxist materialist position, O'Brien's purpose was to connect inextricably Marx's concept of labour to produce objects to the act of giving birth, thereby placing women central in Marxist materialism as she re-defined it. Challenging the persistent denial of women's experiences in political theorizing, O'Brien proposed the relations of reproduction as essential to understanding human social and political endeavours. O'Brien's work identified the discovery of paternity as a precursor to such patriarchal institutions as marriage and sole male rights to offspring.

O'Brien's work theorizes birth, and although her arguments have at times been criticized as essentialist, hers is rather an integration of necessary essentialism and social constructivism. She considered her main purpose in her writing and teaching to place women's experience at the centre of fundamental political discourse.

O'Brien's project extended familiar themes in feminist anthropology of the 1960s and 1970s and extends into radical sociology and anthropology of the 1980s. In the 1990s, her work was eclipsed by feminist philosophers who criticized her work as reducing women's experiences to biological determinism, thereby reducing the range of female experience to a single biological necessity. Explaining and exploring the origins of patriarchy, and offering a heuristic for the analysis of reproductive processes – "moments" – O'Brien created a conceptual framework for understanding the reproductive process: the dialectics of reproduction. She insisted on the standpoint of women, as Marx had assumed the standpoint of the proletariat. She introduced into contemporary social and political theory the expression "malestream" in reference to traditional, mainstream political and philosophical Western thought.

== Technology and reproduction ==
In the last years of her life, in the last decade of the twentieth century, O'Brien wrote and spoke extensively about what she considered a historical moment of equal importance to the articulation of paternity: the development of reproductive technologies. She considered the developments of reproductive technologies to be revolutionary, capable in their implementations of re-configuring women's relationship to reproduction. Reliable, available, and safe contraception could allow women to separate sexual activity from reproduction; reproductive technologies such as in vitro fertilization and surrogate motherhood would allow women who are or who plan to be mothers to re-design their approaches to motherhood.

O'Brien constructed the theoretical analysis that these reproductive technologies had to be assessed not only for their safety but also for the philosophical implications of their capacity to re-configure women's relationship to the labour of reproduction, in the same way The Politics of Reproduction declared the re-configuration of men's relationship to reproduction. This important theoretical analysis was cut short by O'Brien's death in 1998.

== O'Brien's contributions ==
O'Brien left active nursing practice in 1971, but her continued analysis and writing about the politics of nursing had a profound impact on the profession, especially in Canada. She encouraged nursing professionals to take control over their working conditions and their relations to other medical practitioners, especially medical doctors. She helped to instigate a shift in how nursing professionals were educated and their resulting status in the health care field in Canada. She wrote and spoke extensively about healthcare and health care reform in Canada, with particular attention to the role and status of nurses.

O'Brien's lasting contribution to feminist political theory is her analysis of the dialectical structure of reproductive consciousness. The physical labour, literally, involved in women's reproductive experiences must be accounted, both as actual material production but also, more importantly, central to a sense of connection and integration of human endeavour. O'Brien also asserted the ownership over the means of production ought to be extended to women's rights to maintain authority and control over their children.

== Feminist Party of Canada ==
The Feminist Party of Canada (F.P.C.) was founded in 1979.

The party was launched at the Ontario Institute for Studies in Education on 10 June 1979. Mary O'Brien and Angela Miles were keynote speakers at the launch event.

The Feminist Party of Canada emerged from a series of meetings held in the early months of 1979. Its formation was driven by the goal of enhancing women's involvement in the political system. The F.P.C. describes itself as "an integral part of the Women's Movement, with our policies, processes, and organizational structure reflecting the values and objectives of that movement." The F.P.C. asserts that, historically, women have been placed in a subordinate position. Women have carried the responsibility of making communities more humane. Since the political system is the mechanism through which members of a community—and by extension, society—are safeguarded, women must have a role in politics. If they are not adequately represented, it is incumbent upon women to enact the necessary changes.

== Bibliography ==
- 1981 - The Politics of Reproduction
- 1989 - Reproducing the World: Essays in Feminist Theory

== Sources ==
- Mary O'Brien, The politics of reproduction (Routledge and Kegan Paul, 1981).
- Mary O'Brien, Reproducing the world: Essays in feminist theory (Westview Press, 1989).
- Robbie Kahn (1999). "Cats Do Go To Heaven: Remembering Mary O'Brien". Canadian Woman Studies. 18 (4).
