= No Friend But the Mountains =

2018 autobiography by Behrouz Boochani

No Friend But the Mountains: Writing from Manus Prison
- Author: Behrouz Boochani
- Translator: Omid Tofighian
- Language: English
- Genre: Biography
- Publisher: Picador Australia
- Publication date: 2018
- Publication place: Australia
- Media type: Print paperback
- Pages: xxxiv, 374
- Award: Victorian Prize for Literature; Victorian Premier's Prize for Nonfiction
- ISBN: 978-1-760-55538-2
- OCLC: 1031466787
- Foreword by Richard Flanagan; also includes 24-page translator's note.

No Friend But the Mountains: Writing from Manus Prison is an autobiographical account of Behrouz Boochani's perilous journey to Christmas Island and his subsequent incarceration in an Australian government immigration detention facility on Manus Island.

== Background ==
The book was written on a mobile phone using WhatsApp and smuggled out of Manus Island as thousands of PDF files. It was translated from Persian into English by Omid Tofighian, Honorary Associate at the University of Sydney's Philosophy Department. It was published by Picador in late 2018.

In his foreword to the work, Australian writer Richard Flanagan refers to Boochani as "a great Australian writer", who has written not only a "strange and terrible book", but an "account [that] demands a reckoning" for the cruelty to and deliberate destruction of hope of the detainees. Flanagan opens his foreword with: "No Friend but the Mountains is a book that can rightly take its place on the shelf of world prison literature, alongside such diverse works as Oscar Wilde's De Profundis, Antonio Gramsci's Prison Notebooks, Ray Parkin's Into the Smother, Wole Soyinka's The Man Dies, and Martin Luther King Jr.'s Letter from Birmingham Jail".

Translator Tofighian writes in his translator's preface: "Both a profound creative writing project and a strategic act of resistance, the book is part of a coherent theoretical project and critical approach".

== Synopsis and themes ==
Written in prose and poetry, it chronicles Boochani's boat journey from Indonesia to Christmas Island in 2013 and his subsequent detainment on Manus Island, describing the lives (and deaths) of other detainees, the daily routines and various incidents, and reflecting on the system in which they are trapped, up to the point of the prison riots in early 2014. He also makes observations on the Australian guards and the local Papuan people. He characterises individuals about whom he writes using epithets rather than using their real names, with a few important exceptions such as his friend Reza Barati, also known as The Gentle Giant.

Boochani posits that the prison is a Kyriarchal system (a term borrowed from feminist theory), one where different forms of oppression intersect; oppression is not random but purposeful, designed to isolate and create friction amongst prisoners, leading to despair and broken spirits.

In a lengthy afterword by Tofighian, he presents and explores in some detail aspects of the "philosophical ideas, arguments and collaborative interpretations developed by the author and translator", referring to Australia's "border-industrial complex", which is only the beginning of a multi-faceted project called Manus Prison Theory. He believes that the outline of themes is important because it is inspired by Boochani's "research training, intellectual work and vision". The theory hypothesises that the prison as an ideology "hinders or eliminates opportunities to know...both about the violent atrocities and about the unique lived experiences of the prisoners". Boochani is sure that the general public have no idea about the horrors of systematic torture which is integral to the system, and his primary aim is "to expose and communicate this very fact".

== Translation process ==
Tofighian describes in an article in The Conversation the process and the challenges brought about by translating such a work. Starting in December 2016, Boochani's words were first sent to consultant translator Moones Mansoubi, each chapter being one long text message of 9,000 to 17,000 words. Mansoubi would format them into PDFs, and send them to Tofighian, who then translated from Persian to English, consulting regularly with Boochani via WhatsApp along the way. Tofighian had weekly sessions with either Mansoubi or another Iranian researcher in Sydney, during which time Boochani continued to write the book while consulting his friends and literary confidants both in Australia and Iran.

Tofighian had already translated a number of Boochani's articles before he travelled to Manus to meet Boochani, which was soon after the death of another detainee, musician Hamed Shamshiripour, in 2017. When they meet, they discuss nuances, changes, meanings, and also explore ideas and theories outside of the immediate text, Tofighian describing the method as requiring literary experimentation and the process as "a form of shared philosophical activity".

The structural differences are between the two languages pose one of many challenges of translation. The author uses philosophical and psychoanalytic methodology to examine the political commentary and historical account, and Kurdish, Persian and Manusian myth and folklore support the narrative. Tofighian calls the style "horrific surrealism".

=== Author and translator comments ===
Boochani: "I love the book more than anything else I've produced from Manus. The collaboration was fantastic—I enjoyed it immensely. A deep learning experience ... a sweet victory."

Tofighian: "In my opinion, it's the most important thing I’ve ever been involved in. It’s had a profound impact on me, and I've learned a lot from you.... It has such remarkable literary, philosophical and cultural dimensions to it."

== Reception ==
The book was recognised by five prominent Australian authors in The Age as one of the best books of 2018. Robert Manne called it "almost certainly the most important Australian book published in 2018", and authors Sofie Laguna, Maxine Beneba Clarke, Michelle de Kretser and Dennis Altman all sang its praises. Louis Klee wrote in the Times Literary Supplement, "In a decade of Australian politics defined by the leadership spill—a spilt decade, in which any meaningful progress on the issues that define Australia, be it Indigenous affairs, refugee politics, or climate change, effectively stalled—Boochani's witnessing has elevated him to a paradoxical position. Today he may well be the most significant political voice in a country he has never visited".

It won Australia's richest literary prize, the Victorian Prize for Literature, as well as the Victorian Premier's Prize for Nonfiction, awarded by the Wheeler Centre on 31 January 2019. There were questions about Boochani's eligibility for both prizes because entrants had been previously limited to Australian citizens or permanent residents, but he was given an exemption by prize administrators and the judges were unanimous in recognising its literary excellence. Wheeler Centre director Michael Williams said that the judges thought that the story of what's happening on Manus Island essentially is an Australian story, and that "made it completely consistent with the intention of the awards".

Boochani, giving an acceptance speech for the award via video, said that this award "is a victory. It is a victory not only for us but for literature and art and above all it is victory for humanity. It is a victory against the system that has reduced us to numbers". In an interview with the writer Arnold Zable following the award, Boochani said that he has many conflicting thoughts on it, but he sees it as a "political statement from the literary and creative arts community in Australia, and all those who do not agree with the government's thinking".

In April 2019 the book was given a Special Award in the New South Wales Premier's Literary Awards, whose judges called it "an outstanding work of literature in its own right", apart from being "remarkable for the circumstances of its production ... [and] ... compelling and shocking content".

On 2 May 2019, it was announced that the work had won the Australian Book Industry Award (ABIA) for General non-fiction book of the year. On 12 August 2019, the book won the Australian National Biography Award. In May 2020 it won ABIA Audiobook of the year.

== Publication in Iran ==
The Persian translation of No Friend But the Mountains was published in early 2020 by Cheshmeh Publications in Tehran. In April 2020 also the audio version of the book (narrated by the actor Navid Mohammadzadeh) was released in Iran with the permission of Boochani.

== Film ==
In February 2020 it was announced that the book would be adapted to a feature film. A joint production between Hoodlum Entertainment, Sweetshop & Green, and Aurora Films, production was slated to commence mid-2021. It is planned to do most of the shooting in Australia. Writer and producer Ákos Armont and producer Antony Waddington put forward the idea of an adaptation. Boochani said the new film should incorporate some of his previous work, and that of his fellow asylum seekers, as a part of Australian history.

== Symphonic work ==
No Friend But The Mountains: A Symphonic Song Cycle was created by composer Luke Styles and performed live on 21 March 2021 at the Sidney Myer Music Bowl by bass-baritone singer Adrian Tamburini, the Zelman Symphony , and the Melbourne Bach Choir, conducted by Rick Prakhoff. The performance of the song cycle was preceded by Boochani's friend and former Manus inmate Farhad Bandesh singing his own song "The Big Exhale". Hosted by Australian Broadcasting Corporation journalist Rafael Epstein, the event was broadcast on ABC Television in June 2021 and made available on ABC iview. It also includes interviews with Boochani, Tofighian, and others.

== See also ==
- No friend but the mountains
