= Robert Cornall =

Australian public servant

Robert Cornall AO

11th Secretary of the Attorney-General's Department
- In office 24 January 2000 – 31 August 2008
- Preceded by: Tony Blunn
- Succeeded by: Roger Wilkins

Personal details
- Born: Robert John Cornall Melbourne
- Education: University of Melbourne
- Occupation: Public servant

Robert John Cornall AO is a retired Australian senior public servant, he was head of the Attorney-General's Department between 2000 and 2008.

== Early life ==
Robert Cornall was born in Melbourne. He attended Wesley College, then studied for a Bachelor of Laws degree at the University of Melbourne, graduating in 1968.

== Public service career ==
In January 1968, Cornall took up a position in the lawfirm Oswald Burt & Co (later Middeltons Oswald Burt, Solicitors). He was promoted to Partner of the firm in July 1972.

Cornall left Middeltons Oswald Burt, Solicitors in 1987 and moved to a position as Executive Director and Secretary of the not-for-profit member-based Law Institute of Victoria.

Between December 1995 and December 1999, Cornall was the Managing Director of Victoria Legal Aid.

Cornall was appointed Secretary of the Commonwealth Attorney-General's Department in 2000. In the wake of the September 11 terrorist attacks on the United States, the Attorney-General's Department was responsible for implementing the Howard government's national security agenda. The department grew rapidly in numbers under Cornall's leadership, from 550 staff to over 1500.

Cornall retired from the Attorney-General's Department in July 2008.

On 30 July 2017 he became Acting President of the Australian Law Reform Commission.

== Public profile and enquiries ==
As Secretary of the Attorney-General's Department he commented on the alleged torture of Mamdouh Habib. He stated there was no substance to the allegations; however, the Australian Government later settled with Habib out of court.

After his retirement Cornall conducted an investigation for the Australian Government into allegations of sexual abuse at Manus Island.

He carried out a review of conflict of interest of members of Great Barrier Reef Marine Park Authority regarding dumping in the Park.

In February 2014 he was appointed to conduct "a review into the circumstances surrounding the Manus Island disturbances", in which an Iranian detainee (Reza Berati) was killed, with the primary focus on management of security at the centre.

== Awards ==
In 2006, Cornall was appointed an Officer of the Order of Australia for service to the community through contributions to the development of public policy, particularly counter-terrorism arrangements in a changing global security environment and through providing advice and governance across a diverse range of responsibilities within the civil justice system.

== References and further reading ==
- Cornall, Robert (2012), "Chapter 8: Impressions, observations and lessons from a Canberra outsider", in Wanna, John; Vincent, Sam; Podger, Andrew Stuart (eds.), With the benefit of hindsight: Valedictory reflections from departmental secretaries, 2004–11 (PDF), Canberra, Australia: Australian National University, pp. 73–85, ISBN 9781921862731, archived from the original (PDF) on 5 February 2014
- Malone, Paul (2006), "Chapter 16: Keeping the Customer Satisfied – Robert Cornall, Attorney-General's Department", Australian department heads under Howard : career paths and practice (PDF), Canberra, Australia: The Australian National University, pp. 107–112, ISBN 1-920942-83-1, archived from the original (PDF) on 6 November 2013

Government offices
Preceded by Tony Blunn	Secretary of the Attorney-General's Department; 2000–2008	Succeeded by Roger Wilkins
