= Omid Tofighian =

Iranian-Australian philosopher and translator

- Born: Tehran

Education
- Education: PhD
- Alma mater: Leiden University
- Thesis: Myth and philosophy on stage in Platonic dialogues (2010)
- Doctoral advisor: Frans de Haas

Philosophical work
- Era: 21st century Philosophy
- Region: Western philosophy
- Institutions: University of Sydney

Omid Tofighian (Persian: امید توفیقیان) is an Iranian-Australian philosopher and Honorary Research Associate at the University of Sydney. He is known for his research on ancient Greek philosophy and his translation of the award-winning book by Kurdish-Iranian asylum seeker Behrouz Boochani, No Friend But the Mountains from Persian into English.

== Education and career ==
Tofighian graduated with a combined honours degree in philosophy and religious studies at the University of Sydney, and earned his PhD at the Leiden University in the Netherlands. He has worked as a university teacher at the Abu Dhabi University, in the UAE, was a visiting scholar at K.U. Leuven in Belgium and later became an assistant professor in philosophy at the American University in Cairo.

As of 2021 Tofighian works as an Honorary Research Associate for the Department of Philosophy at the University of Sydney. He is also a faculty member of Iran Academia as well as campaign manager for the "Why Is My Curriculum White? - Australasia" campaign. As an activist, he advocates for asylum seekers and refugees in Australia.

He has published works on Greek philosophy and mythology, adopting an interdisciplinary approach.

Tofighian's translated asylum seeker Behrouz Boochani's No Friend But the Mountains: Writing from Manus Prison, which was sent to him one WhatsApp message at a time, from Persian to English, leading to its publication in 2018. Writing about the process of working with Boochani on the translation (which took five years), Tofighian wrote:

Behrouz and I had a mutual understanding; in fact, the translation team embodied a kind of collective intention or shared agency. Our literary and philosophical interpretations evolved throughout the process.

== Awards and recognition ==
He and colleagues were awarded the “Living Together Safely” grant by the federal Attorney-General's Department Grant from 2015 to 2016. In 2016 he was awarded the Dean's "Commendation for Excellence in First Year Teaching for Writing: Style and Method (WRIT1000)" at Sydney University, in the same year being nominated for the university's Faculty Overall Teaching Award.

Tofighian's translation of Boochani's No Friend But the Mountains: Writing from Manus Prison won Australia's richest literary prize, the Victorian Prize for Literature, as well as the Victorian Premier's Prize for Nonfiction, awarded by the Wheeler Centre, on 31 January 2019. The book later won further awards, including a special award at the New South Wales Premier's Literary Awards,

== Publications ==
=== Author ===
- Macpherson, R., Tofighian, O. "Preparing and Developing School Leaders in the Middle East: Mediating Westernization with Indigenous and Evidence-based Practice and Theory of Educative Leadership". In Jacky Lumby, Gary Crow and Petros Pashiardis (Eds.), International Handbook on the Preparation and Development of School Leaders, (pp. 383–409). New York: Routledge. (2008)
- "Contemporary Liminal Encounters: Moving Beyond Traditional Plots in Majidi's Baran". In Asghar Seyed-Gohrab and Kamran Talattof (Eds.), Conflict and Development in Iranian Film, (pp. 103–116). Leiden: Leiden University Press. (2013)
- Myth and Philosophy in Platonic Dialogues. London: Palgrave Macmillan UK. 2016. doi:10.1057/978-1-137-58044-3. ISBN 978-1-137-58043-6.
- Creating New Languages of Resistance: Translation, Public Philosophy and Border Violence. London: Routledge. 2025. doi:10.4324/9781003455493. ISBN 9781032596266.

=== Translator ===
- Boochani, Behrouz (October 2018). No friend but the Mountains: Writing from Manus Prison. Translated by Tofighian, Omid. Picador Australia. ISBN 9781760555382.
