= FIFO (film festival) =

International documentary film festival held in Tahiti

The Festival International du Film Documentaire Océanien (FIFO), in English literally "International Oceanian Documentary Film Festival", is an annual film festival held on the French Polynesian island of Tahiti. Variant names in English include Pacific International Documentary Film Festival and International Documentary Film Festival of Oceania, but the event is commonly referred to in English as just FIFO, FIFO film festival, or FIFO Tahiti.

The festival was founded in 2004 and quickly drew attention from filmmakers both in the Oceania region and elsewhere in the world. The festival celebrates documentary films from all over the world, and the event includes conferences, an Oceanian fiction night, workshops and other side-events. The festival has links and relationships with other festivals in France as well as other countries in the Pacific region such as New Caledonia and Australia.

The festival includes feature-length documentaries (in competition) as well as made for television documentaries and both documentary and fiction short films.

== Selected films shown at FIFO ==
- In 2015, the Hawaiian film Kumu Hina won the Second Jury Prize and the Public Prize (Audience Award).
- In 2016, Australian film Another Country took out the Grand Jury Prize.
- In 2019, Island of the Hungry Ghosts, Gurrumul and Au Nom du Père, du Fils et des Esprits won the three Grand Jury Special Prizes (Prix spécial du jury).
- In 2020, Angus McDonald's short film Manus won Best Documentary.
