= Behrouz Boochani =

Kurdish-Iranian writer and journalist

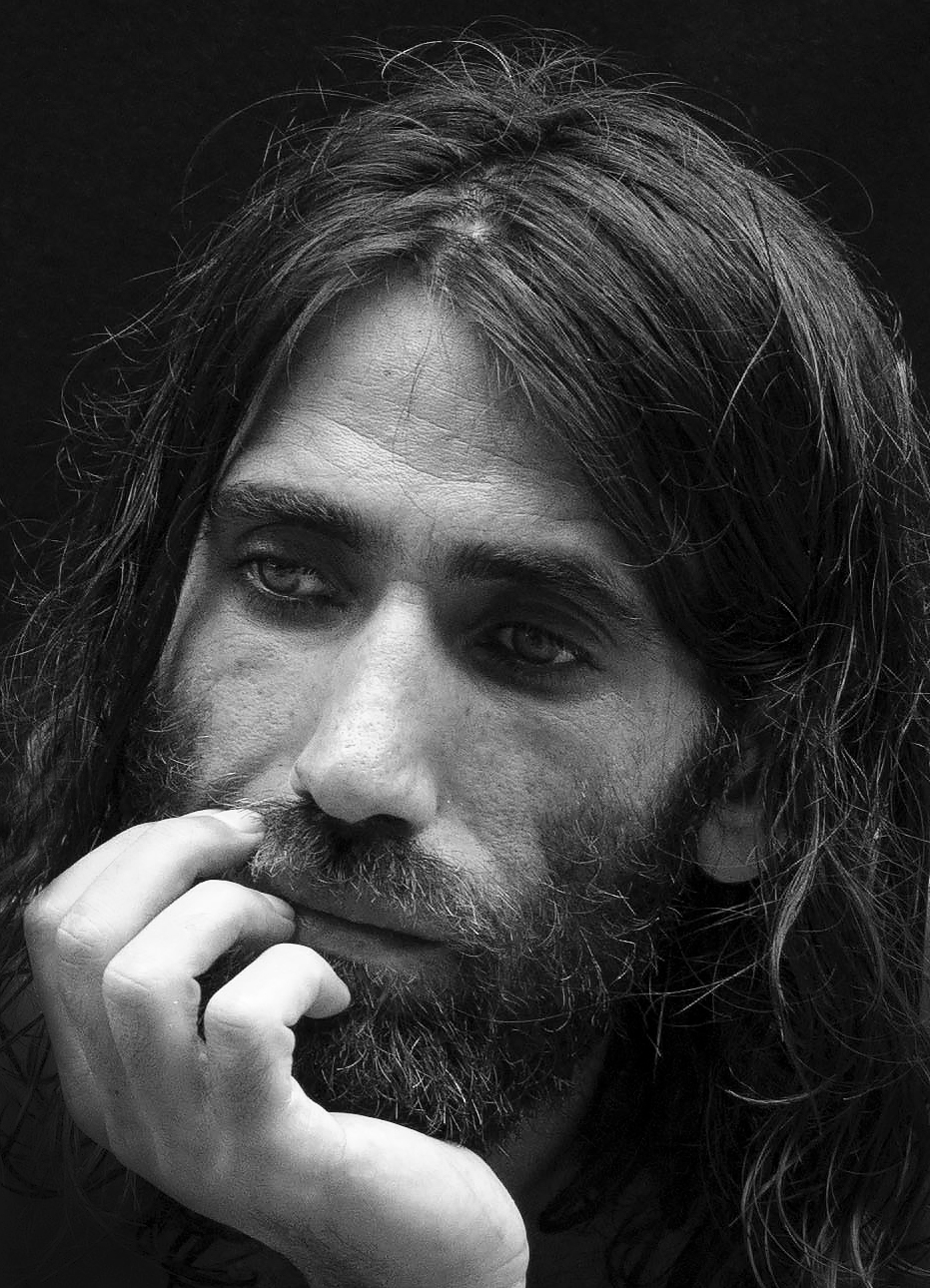
- Boochani in 2018
- Born: 23 July 1983 (age 43); Ilam, Iran
- Education: Tarbiat Modares University; Tarbiat Moallem (Kharazmi) University
- Occupations: Journalist, writer, filmmaker, refugee advocate
- Writing career
- Notable works: No Friend But the Mountains: Writing from Manus Prison; Chauka, Please Tell Us the Time (film)
- Notable awards: Victorian Prize for Literature; Victorian Premier's Prize for Nonfiction
- Website: behrouzboochani.com

Behrouz Boochani (Kurdish: بێێڕوز بووچانی; born 23 July 1983) is an Iranian Kurdish journalist, human rights defender, writer and film producer living in New Zealand. He was held in the Australian-run Manus Island detention centre in Papua New Guinea from 2013 until its closure in 2017. He remained on the island before being moved to Port Moresby along with the other detainees around September 2019. On 14 November 2019 he arrived in Christchurch on a one-month visa, to speak at a special event organised by WORD Christchurch on 29 November, as well as other speaking events. In December 2019, his one-month visa to New Zealand expired and he remained on an expired visa until being granted refugee status in July 2020, at which time he became a Senior Adjunct Research Fellow at the University of Canterbury.

Boochani is the co-director, along with Iranian film maker Arash Kamali Sarvestani, of the documentary Chauka, Please Tell Us the Time, has published numerous articles in leading media internationally about the plight of refugees held by the Australian government on Manus Island, and has won several awards.

His memoir, No Friend But the Mountains: Writing from Manus Prison, won the Victorian Prize for Literature and the Victorian Premier's Prize for Nonfiction in January 2019. The book was tapped out on a mobile phone in a series of single messages over time and translated from Persian into English by Omid Tofighian.

After the November 2022 publication of his second collection of writings, Freedom, Only Freedom: The Prison Writings of Behrouz Boochani, Boochani visited Australia for the first time to promote the book in December 2022.

== Life ==
=== In Iran ===
Boochani was born in Ilam, Iran in 1983. He has described himself as "a child of war", referring to the 1980s war between the Iraqi Ba'athists and "Iranian zealots" fought largely in his Kurdish homeland in western Iran. He graduated from Tarbiat Modares University and the Tarbiat Moallem University (now named Kharazmi University), both in Tehran, with a master's degree in political science, political geography and geopolitics.

He began his journalistic career writing for the student newspaper at Tarbiat Modares University, before working as a freelance journalist for several Iranian newspapers such as Kasbokar Weekly, Qanoon, and Tehran -based Etemaad as well as the Iranian Sports Agency. He wrote articles on Middle East politics, minority rights and the survival of Kurdish culture. In secret, he taught children and adults a particular Kurdish dialect from the region of Ilam, regarded as their mother tongue. He co-founded and produced the Kurdish magazine Werya (also spelt Varia), which he regarded as his most important work, and which attracted the attention of the Iranian authorities because of its political and social content. The magazine promoted Kurdish culture and politics; Boochani felt it very important for the Kurdish city of Ilam to retain its Kurdish identity, language and culture. As a member of the Kurdish Democratic party, outlawed in Iran, and the National Union of Kurdish Students, he was watched closely.

In February 2013, the offices of Werya were raided by Islamic Revolutionary Guard Corps, which was founded after the 1979 revolution to protect the country's Islamic Republic system and to quell uprisings of "deviant movements", and had previously threatened Boochani with detention. Boochani was not in the office that day, but 11 of Boochani's colleagues were arrested, several of whom were subsequently imprisoned. After publishing news of the arrests online and the news spreading globally, Boochani went into hiding for three months and on 23 May 2013, fled Iran and made his way to Indonesia via Southeast Asia.

=== In detention ===
In July 2013, on his second attempt to make a crossing from Indonesia to Australia in a boat carrying 60 asylum seekers, the boat was intercepted by the Royal Australian Navy. Boochani and his fellow asylum seekers were detained first on Christmas Island and after one month transferred to the Manus Island detention centre in August 2013, as part of Australia's Pacific Solution II. Manus is where the Australian government detains single male refugees, whose maritime arrivals are six times more numerous than that of women.

Boochani started making contact with journalists and human rights defenders outside the camp. He gathered information about human rights abuses within the camp and sent them via a secret mobile phone to news organisations and advocacy groups such as The Guardian, The Sydney Morning Herald, the Refugee Action Collective, and the United Nations. In September 2015, PEN International (the Melbourne and Norwegian branches of which Boochani is now an honorary member) and a coalition of human rights groups launched an international campaign on Boochani's behalf, urging the Australian government to abide by its obligations to the principle of non-refoulement, as defined by Article 33 of the United Nations Convention Relating to the Status of Refugees. Several campaigns have urged individuals to write to Peter Dutton, Minister for Immigration and Border Protection, the Australian Prime Minister and high commissioners. Reporters without Borders warned that dissent was not tolerated by Iran's theocratic regime, and that Boochani's "freedom would be in great danger if he were forced to return to Iran". Boochani has asked repeatedly to be handed to the UN.

He also became a spokesperson for the men in his compound, Foxtrot, meeting with PNG immigration and other officials as well as Amnesty International and the UNHCR representatives. He was moved to Chauka, the solitary confinement block constructed of shipping containers, for three days. He was also jailed during the 2015 hunger strike that was put down by force; he spent eight days inside Lorengau prison and was then released without charge after being asked to stop reporting.

He said in a radio interview on Autonomous Action Radio ahead of the release of his film Chauka, Please Tell Us the Time in 2016 that it was his intention to show the Australian public what the government was doing to detainees on the island, and spoke of the mental torture caused by being deprived of hope.

In March 2017, Boochani's plight was raised in the Australian House of Representatives by Australian parliamentarian Adam Bandt.

Although forcibly moved to accommodation outside the detention centre some weeks after it was officially closed on 31 October 2017, Boochani could not leave the island without travel documents. The only way to reach the nearby town of Lorengau is on an official bus, and the refugees are routinely body-searched when they leave and return. He wrote of what was happening and of his fear during the siege that followed the closure, as well as the articles he wrote for The Guardian at the time, among other things, in WhatsApp messages to translator and friend Omid Tofighian, later published in full.

On 28 November 2017, Boochani sent a message to the Australian public via the Asylum Seeker Resource Centre (ASRC) which was published on their website, thanking them for their humanity, and describing the recent peaceful protest by refugees on the island after the closure of the detention centre, which was met with force. He said that Peter Dutton was not correct in saying that their only desire was to come to Australia; they only want freedom and safety in any safe country, and they were not free nor safe on Manus.

In a speech delivered to guests at a Human Rights Law Centre dinner in 2018, he expressed the view that the Australian Government was manipulating its people, using propaganda that centres on national security. In a radio interview with SBS Radio, he thanked the "many brave people in Australia who have been fighting against this system", saying that Australian people are not cruel and were they fully aware of what is exactly happening, they would not have let their government do this.

Boochani was featured as the subject of ABC TV's Australian Story. He said that he would not be following through with resettlement in Papua New Guinea, and now regrets his decision to aim for Australia.

=== Freedom ===
On 14 November 2019, Boochani left Manus and travelled to New Zealand on a one-month visa to speak at the WORD Christchurch festival in Christchurch. Boochani said upon arrival that he was savouring life as a "free man". The US has technically accepted him as part of the “refugee swap” deal, but now that he has left PNG, he fears that his status is uncertain. If the US offer is revoked, he will look at the possibilities of applying to another country.

Boochani feels a sense of duty towards the men he was forced to leave behind in PNG. Apart from those who have died, he said that about three-quarters of the refugees and asylum seekers sent to the Manus camp since 2012 have left for Australia, the US, or other countries. However, he is deeply concerned that some remain trapped there, especially the 46 who are being held in Bomana prison in Port Moresby.

Still in New Zealand in late February 2020, Boochani, responding to Peter Dutton's comment that he would never be allowed into Australia, said that he has never said that he wanted to go to Australia. It was not yet known whether he had applied for asylum in New Zealand.

On 24 July 2020, the New Zealand Government granted refugee status to Boochani, allowing him to stay in New Zealand indefinitely and to apply for a residency visa. On that day it was also announced that Boochani had been appointed a Senior Adjunct Research Fellow of the University of Canterbury, based at Kā Waimaero, the Ngāi Tahu Research Centre.

On 6 December 2022 Boochani started a tour of Australia, with several speaking engagements in Sydney and elsewhere. It is a work trip to promote his new book, Freedom, Only Freedom. He has also given radio interviews.

== Works from Manus Island ==
While living in the Manus Island detention centre Boochani has had many of his articles published by online news and other media, such as "The day my friend Hamid Kehazaei died" in The Guardian and "Life on Manus: Island of the Damned" in The Saturday Paper, and others by HuffPost, Financial Times, and the New Matilda. Guardian journalist Ben Doherty, upon accepting the Amnesty International Australia award on Behrouz's behalf in 2017, said that Boochani "...rightly, sees himself as a working journalist on Manus Island, whose job it is to be bear witness to the injustices and the violence and the privation of offshore detention". Some of his articles have been published on Kurdish websites in Iran.

He has also published poems online and narrates his story in the award-winning animated short documentary film Nowhere Lines: Voices of Manus Island, made by UK film-maker Lucas Schrank in 2015). In 2017 he was the subject and co-producer of the award-winning Until We Are All Free, a graphic narrative in collaboration with Positive/Negatives and illustrator, Alex Mankiewicz.

The film Chauka, Please Tell Us the Time was shot inside the Manus Island detention centre by Boochani, entirely on a mobile phone, and released on 11 June 2017 at the Sydney Film Festival. A review of the film was written by the award-winning writer Arnold Zable.

In February 2018, he wrote an article about the murder of his friend Reza Barati during riots at the camp in 2014 and the injustice of the events that followed. Included is a poem about his "gentle giant and best friend", called Our Mothers, a poem for Reza. In March 2018 the full-length documentary film, Stop the Boats! (the title reflecting a government slogan), directed by Simon V. Kurian, was released, featuring Boochani and others.

At the end of the 2019 short documentary film Manus, made by Angus McDonald, Boochani narrates his poem called "Manus Poem" in Persian.

=== No Friend But the Mountains ===
In July 2018, his memoir No Friend But the Mountains: Writing from Manus Prison was published by Picador. Written in prose and poetry, it chronicles his boat journey from Indonesia, his detainment on Manus Island and the lives (and deaths) of other prisoners, as well as observations on the Australian guards and the local Papuan people. The book was laboriously tapped out on a mobile phone in Persian in fragments via WhatsApp and translated from the Persian to English by his friend Omid Tofighian. He posits that the prison is a Kyriarchal system (a term borrowed from feminist theory), one where different forms of oppression intersect; oppression is not random but purposeful, designed to isolate and create friction amongst prisoners, leading to despair and broken spirits.

In his foreword to the work, Australian writer Richard Flanagan refers to Boochani as "a great Australian writer". Louis Klee wrote in the Times Literary Supplement, "In a decade of Australian politics defined by the leadership spill—a spilt decade, in which any meaningful progress on the issues that define Australia, be it Indigenous affairs, refugee politics, or climate change, effectively stalled—Boochani's witnessing has elevated him to a paradoxical position. Today he may well be the most significant political voice in a country he has never visited".

No Friend But the Mountains won the Victorian Prize for Literature and the Victorian Premier's Prize for Nonfiction on 31 January 2019. There were questions about Boochani's eligibility for both prizes because entrants had been previously limited to Australian citizens or permanent residents, but he was given an exemption by prize administrators and the judges were unanimous in recognising its literary excellence. Wheeler Centre director Michael Williams said that the judges thought that the story of what's happening on Manus Island essentially is an Australian story, and that "made it completely consistent with the intention of the awards". In an interview with the writer Arnold Zable following the award, Boochani said that he has many conflicting thoughts on it, but he sees it as a "political statement from the literary and creative arts community in Australia, and all those who do not agree with the government's thinking".

In April 2019 the book was given a Special Award in the New South Wales Premier's Literary Awards, whose judges called it "an outstanding work of literature in its own right", apart from being "...remarkable for the circumstances of its production...[and]...compelling and shocking content".

On 2 May, it was announced that the work had won the Australian Book Industry Award (ABIA) for General non-fiction book of the year.

A film of the book is due to be made in 2021, shot mainly in Australia. Boochani said the new film should incorporate some of his previous work, and that of his fellow asylum seekers as a record of part of Australian history.

The film is to be directed by Rodd Rathjen and has been announced as one of the projects selected for the virtual 15th Ontario Creates International Financing Forum in association with the Toronto International Film Festival. Rathjen will work in close collaboration with Boochani (who takes on the roles of story consultant and associate producer) and writer and producer Ákos Armont.

=== Remain (video installation) ===
Boochani collaborated with Iranian-born Melbourne photographer Hoda Afshar on a two-channel video work, Remain, which includes spoken poetry by him and Iranian poet Bijan Elahi. Afshar describes her method as "staged documentary", in which the men on the island are able to "re-enact their narratives with their own bodies and [gives] them autonomy to narrate their own stories." The video was shown as part of the Primavera 2018 exhibition at the Museum of Contemporary Art Australia in Sydney, from 9 November 2018 to 3 February 2019. Both Afshar and Boochani believe that art can hit home in a more powerful way, after the public has become immune to images of and journalism about suffering. Writing about an award-winning portrait of himself by Afshar taken as part of the Remain project, Boochani says that the project would be part of the creation of a "new artistic language that is not beholden to the framework of colonialism", and in accordance with the "Manus Prison Theory".

=== Manus (play) ===
Boochani is one of the subjects of, as well as chief collaborator on, the play Manus written by Leila Hekmatnia and Keyvan Sarreshteh, Directed by Nazanin Sahamizadeh in 2017, which tells the story of eight Iranians who fled Iran for Australia. It relates the stories of their lives in Iran and their experiences in detention on Manus, including details of the riot in February 2014, which led to the murder of one of them, Reza Barati, by locals. It was performed in Tehran in February–March 2017, running for a month in the Qashqai Hall of the City Theatre Complex and attended by nearly 3000 people, including Abbas Araghchi, Iran's deputy foreign minister, and Australian diplomats. It was also performed in two cities in Bangladesh in October 2017, at the Chittagong Shilpakala Academy in Chittagong and in Dhaka. The director Sahamizadeh said it was performed there as a part of its international tour to express compassion and solidarity with Rohingya refugees from Myanmar who had sought protection in Bangladesh recently. It will be directed by the author and produced by the Verbatim Theatre Group at the Adelaide Festival in March 2019.

== Later works ==
In March 2023 a production of Euripides' play Women of Troy, directed by Ben Winspear and starring his wife actor-producer Marta Dusseldorp was staged at the 10 Days on the Island festival in Tasmania. Boochani's poetry was set to music composed by Katie Noonan and performed by a chorus of Tasmanian women and girls, interspersed with the text of the play.

== Awards and recognition ==
- Diaspora Symposium Social Justice Award in October 2016.
- On the shortlist of four for the Index on Censorship's Freedom of Expression Award in the category of Journalism in 2017.
- Tampa Award, April 2018, presented by Rural Australians for Refugees, for "selfless and substantial contribution to the welfare of refugees".
- Amnesty International Australia 2017 Media Award, for his work on The Guardian and The Saturday Paper.
- STARTTS Humanitarian Award (Media), for "Media outlets, journalists or media officers supporting, prioritising and/or raising awareness of refugee issues".
- Voltaire Award, Empty Chair Award, awarded July 2018 by Liberty Australia.
- Anna Politkovskaya Award for Journalism, October 2018.
- Sir Ronald Wilson Human Rights Award, October 2018.
- Victorian Prize for Literature and the Victorian Premier's Prize for Nonfiction, January 2019, for No Friend But the Mountains: Writing from Manus Prison..
- Special Award, New South Wales Premier's Literary Awards, April 2019, for No Friend But the Mountains.
- General Non-Fiction Book of the Year, Australian Book Industry Awards, April 2019, for No Friend But the Mountains.
- National Biography Award, August 2019, for No Friend But the Mountains.
- Audiobook of the year, Australian Book Industry Awards, 2020 for No Friend But the Mountains.
- A portrait of Boochani by artist Angus McDonald won the People's Choice Award in the Archibald Prize, a prestigious Australian portraiture art award, in 2020.

== List of works ==
=== Film and video ===
- Chauka, Please Tell Us the Time. 2016 (Documentary film)
- Remain. 2018. (Collaborator on video work created by Hoda Afshar.)

=== Narrative works ===
- They cannot take the sky: Stories from detention. 2017. (Chapter.)
- No Friend But the Mountains: Writing from Manus Prison. 2018. Translated by Omid Tofighian; foreword by Richard Flanagan.
- Boochani, Behrouz; Skilbeck, Ruth (2018), A letter from Manus Island, Preface by Ruth Skilbeck., Borderstream Books, ISBN 978-0-648-39839-4, "...first published by The Saturday Paper in December 2017"
- Freedom, Only Freedom : The Prison Writings of Behrouz Boochani (November 2022)
- Boochani, Behrouz (2022), Tofighian, Omid; Loughnan, Claire (eds.), On detention, dispossession and resistance : the writings of Behrouz Boochani, I.B. Tauris, ISBN 978-0-7556-4268-7

=== Poetry ===
- "Behrouz Boochani". Writing through Fences. Archived from the original ((prose and poetry)) on 17 February 2019.
- "The Black Kite; and, The Deep Dark". 2015. Archived from the original on 10 February 2019. (Poems)
- "Untitled". 2016. (Poem)
- Our Mothers, a poem for Reza. (Poem)
- Poetry used as lyrics in Women of Troy (2023 stage production)
