= Malestream =

Malestream is a concept developed by feminist theorists to describe the situation when male social scientists, particularly sociologists, carry out research which focuses on a masculine perspective and then assumes that the findings can be applied to women as well. Originally developed as a critique of male dominated sociology, the term has since been applied to geography, anthropology, theology, and psychology.

The term was first used by Mary O'Brien in her 1981 book The Politics of Reproduction. As a portmanteau, it involves a play on words with the more general term "mainstream" and involves a detournement of the concept of mainstream science. There has been a tendency to identify "good science" with "mainstream science". However, what has been termed "epistemologies of ignorance" have been described as being at work within the social construction of science and the women's health movement which emerged in the 1970s and which provided a context for O'Brien's work.

== Whitestream feminism ==
The comparable term Whitestream was developed by Claude Denis in his 1997 book We Are Not You: First Nations and Canadian Modernity, to describe that contemporary discourses are structured around the basis of White Anglo-Saxon experience.

== See also ==
- Mansplaining
- Standpoint theory
