= City of Film =

Recognition conferred by UNESCO

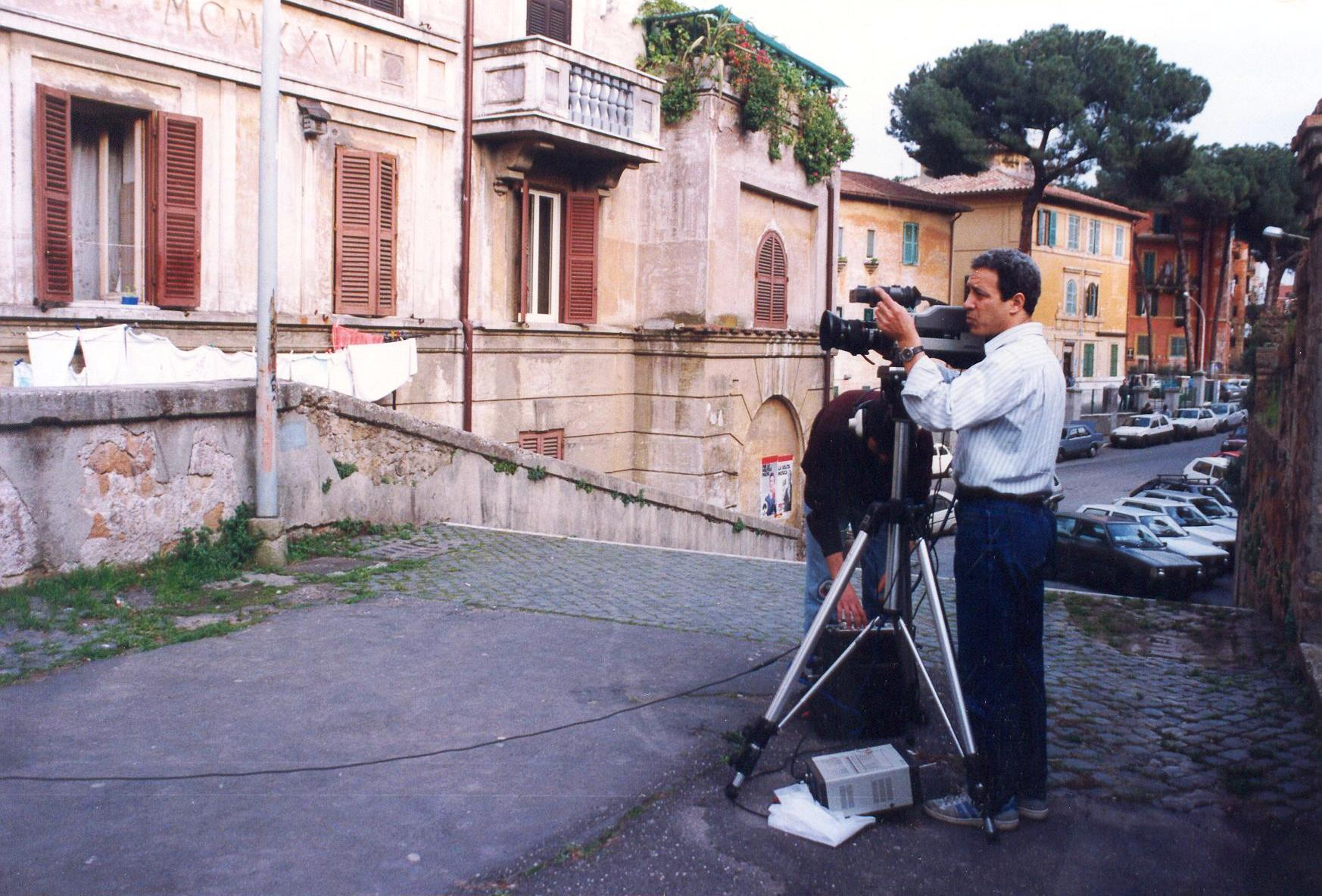
Filming a documentary in Rome, 1992

UNESCO City of Film is a designation awarded by UNESCO under the UNESCO Creative Cities Network (UCCN) to cities that demonstrate a significant contribution to the development of film as a creative industry and as a driver of sustainable urban development. Established in 2009, the designation recognises cities with a strong tradition of filmmaking, film education, preservation of cinematic heritage, and support for the audiovisual industry.

Cities of Film cooperate internationally by exchanging expertise, promoting cultural diversity, supporting filmmakers and creative professionals, and developing projects that strengthen the role of cinema in education, tourism, economic development, and public life.

Film is one of eight creative fields in the UNESCO Creative Cities Network, the others are: Architecture, Crafts and Folk Art, Design, Gastronomy, Literature, Media Arts, and Music.

== Criteria ==
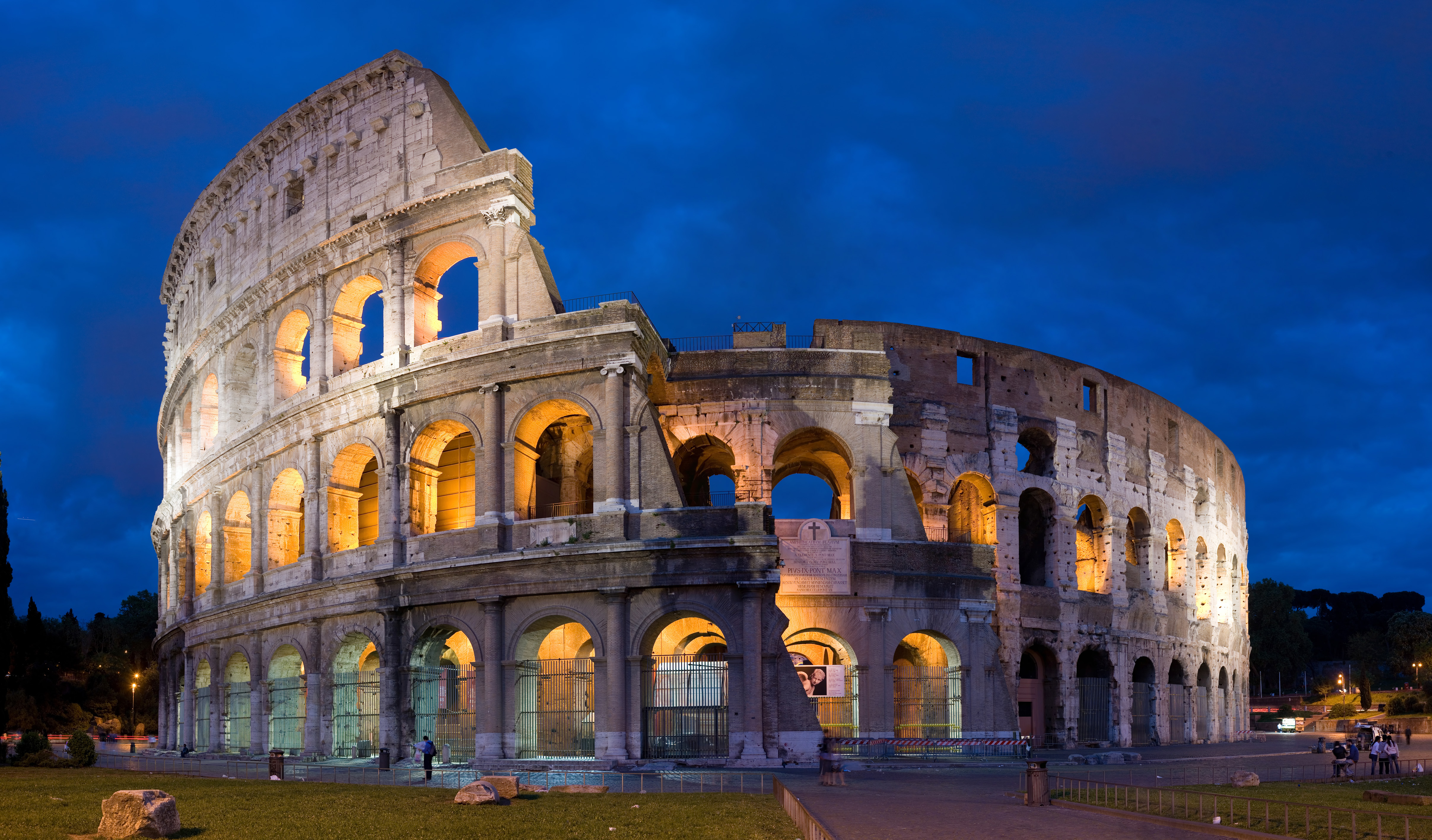
The Colosseum in Rome

To be approved as a City of Film, cities need to meet a number of criteria set by UNESCO.

Designated UNESCO Cities of Film share similar characteristics:

- important infrastructure related to cinema, e.g. film studios and film landscapes/environments
- continuous or proven links to the production, distribution, and commercialisation of films
- experience in hosting film festivals, screenings, and other film-related events
- collaborative initiatives at a local, regional, and international level
- film heritage in the form of archives, museums, private collections, and/or film institutes
- film making schools and training centres
- effort in disseminating films produced and/or directed locally or nationally
- initiatives to encourage knowledge-sharing on foreign films

== About the cities ==
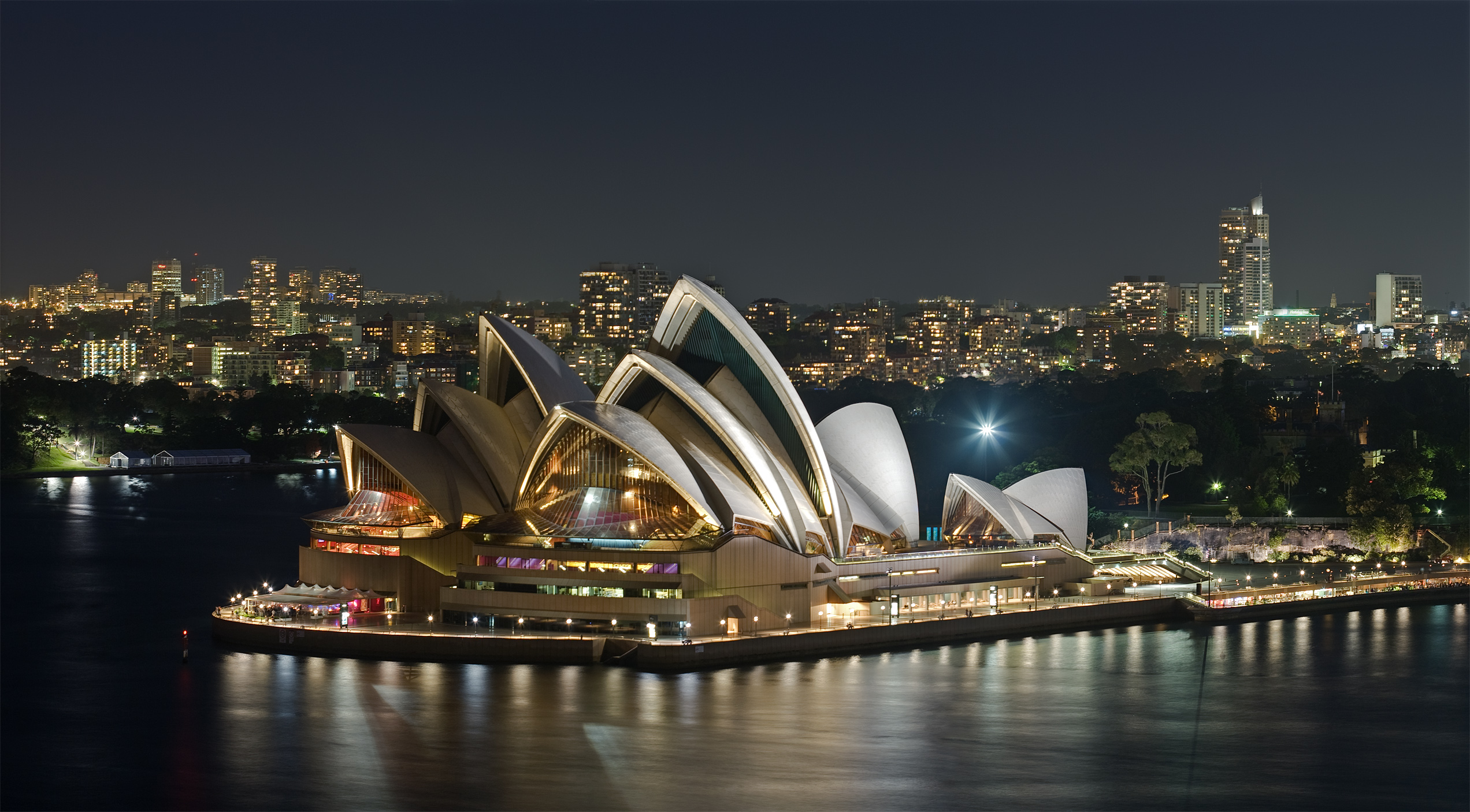
Sydney Opera House

Bradford became the first City of Film in 2009, with Sydney joining in 2010. Sydney is home to Fox Studios Australia, the studio that brought The Matrix trilogy, The Great Gatsby, and The Wolverine to life. Its "pristine beaches" and "lush mountains" can also provide a backdrop for location shooting.

Busan hosts an annual International Film Festival and is a "standard-setter" in the film world.

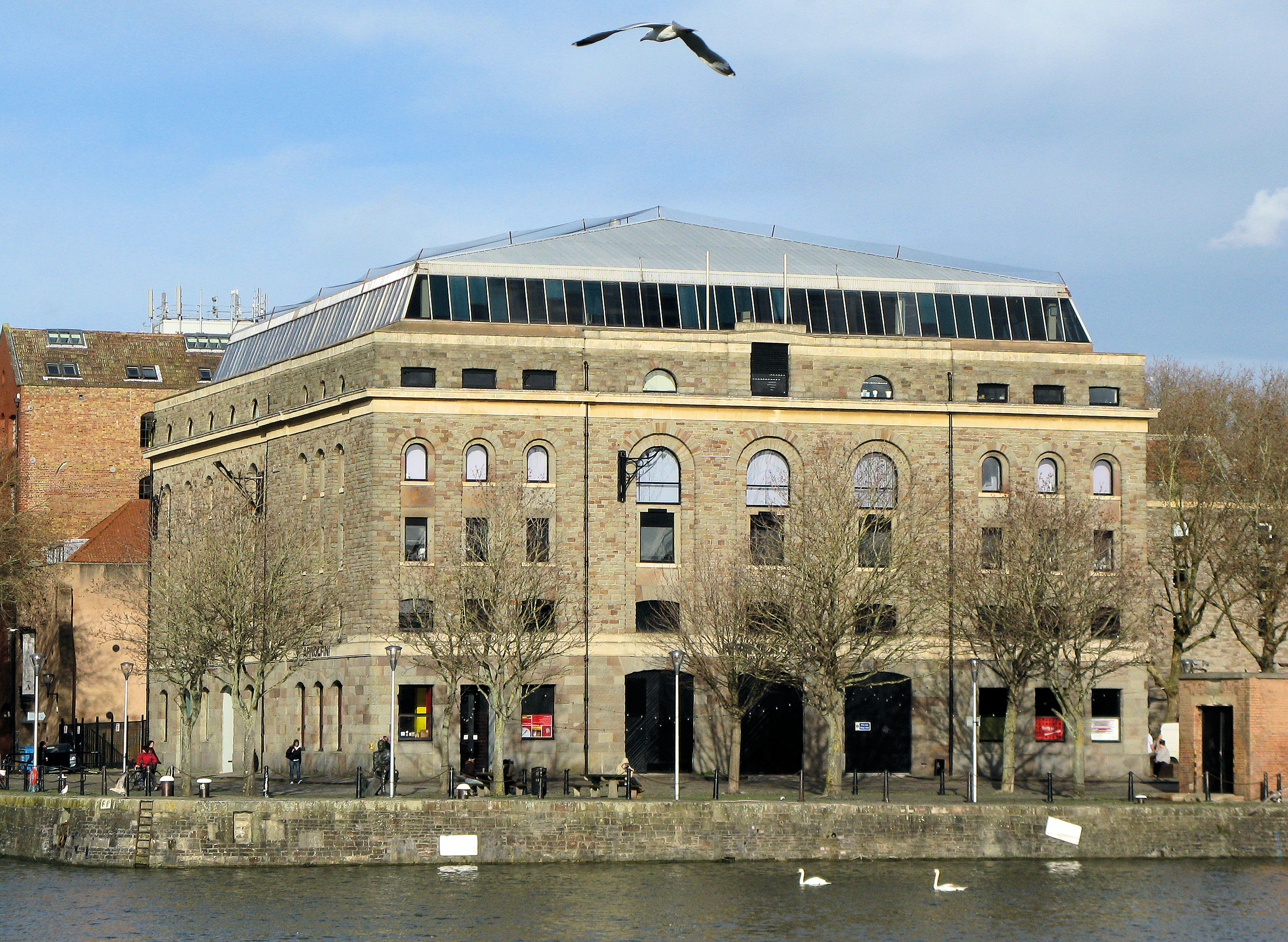
The Arnolfini in Bristol

Bristol is home to the Academy award-winning Aardman Animations. It is also home to The Bottle Yard Studios and the BBC Natural History Unit. Bristol is "packed with history and full of character," Yamagata is a "pleasant, bustling rural capital."

Yamagata hosts every two years an International Documentary Film Festival.

Potsdam is home to Babelsberg Studio, the largest film studio in Germany. It is also home to Film Park of Babelsberg and Film University of Babelsberg.

Mumbai is home to Hindi cinema.

== Cities of Film ==
São Paulo, Brazil

As of 2025, four countries have multiple Cities of Film: Brazil has three Cities of Film; Poland, Spain and the United Kingdom (specifically England) have two each.

City	Country	Year
Asaba	Nigeria	2023
Bitola	North Macedonia	2015
Bradford	United Kingdom	2009
Bristol	United Kingdom	2017
Busan	South Korea	2014
Cannes	France	2021
Cluj-Napoca	Romania	2021
Galway	Ireland	2014
Gdynia	Poland	2021
Giza	Egypt	2025
Ho Chi Minh City	Vietnam	2025
Kathmandu	Nepal	2023
Łódź	Poland	2017
Mumbai	India	2019
Ouarzazate	Morocco	2023
Penedo	Brazil	2023
Potsdam	Germany	2019
Qingdao	China	2017
Quezon City	Philippines	2025
Rome	Italy	2015
Santos	Brazil	2015
São Paulo	Brazil	2025
Sarajevo	Bosnia and Herzegovina	2019
Sofia	Bulgaria	2014
Sydney	Australia	2010
Terrassa	Spain	2017
Valladolid	Spain	2019
Vicente López	Argentina	2023
Wellington	New Zealand	2019
Yamagata	Japan	2017

== See also ==
- Creative Cities Network
- City of Literature
- City of Music
- Design Cities
- City of Crafts and Folk Arts
- City of Gastronomy
- City of Media Arts
