= City of Literature =

Recognition conferred by UNESCO

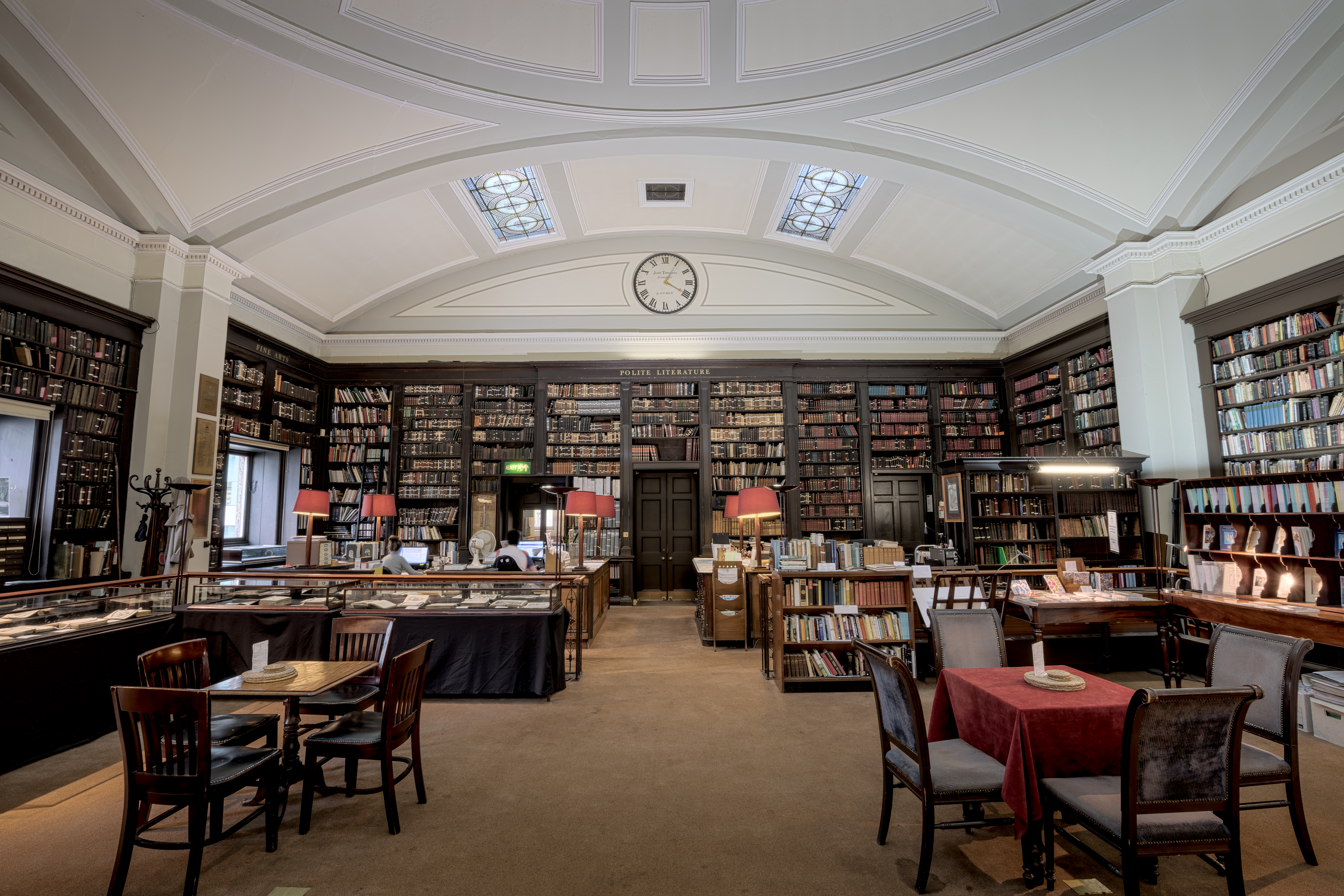
The Portico Library in Manchester

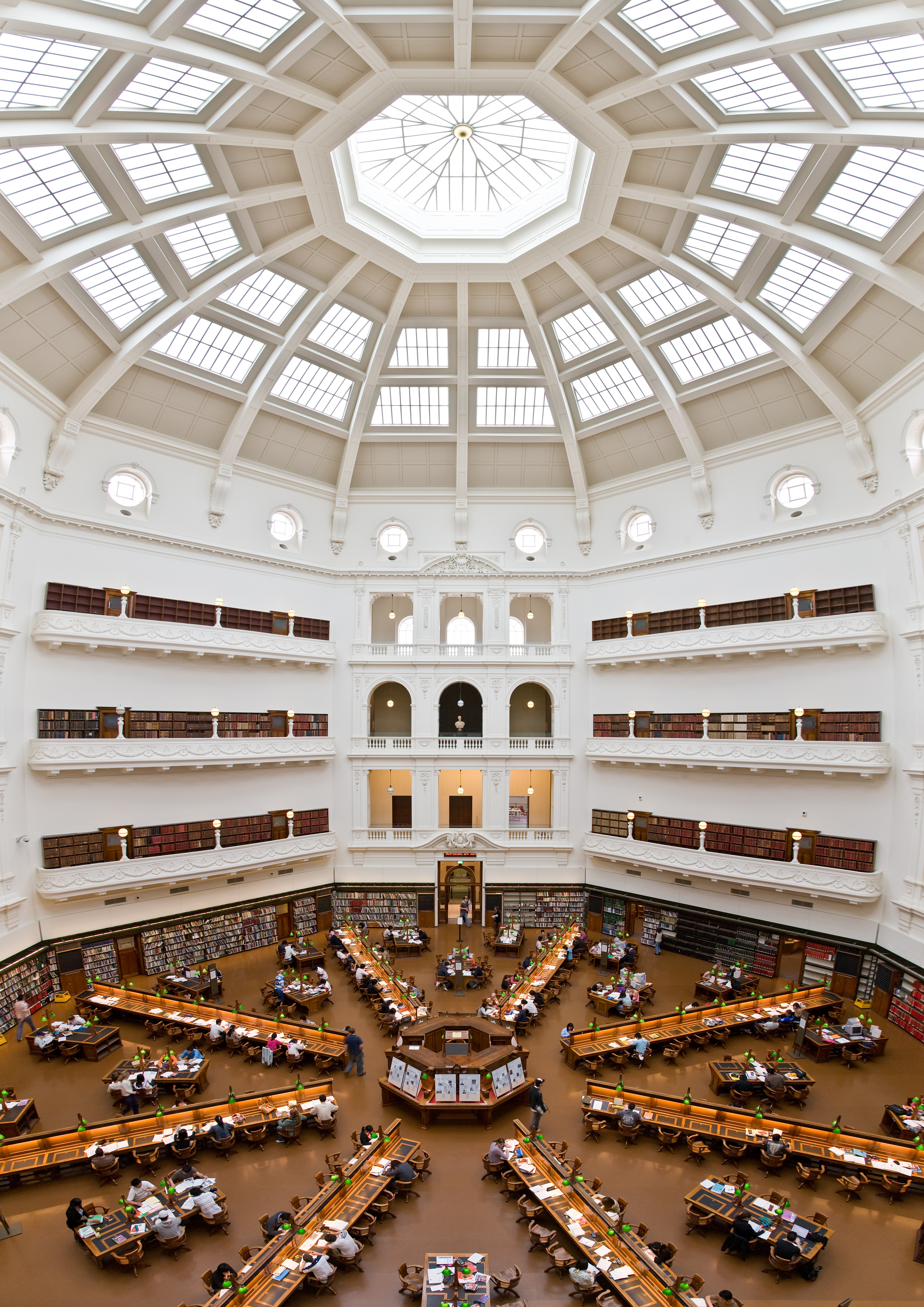
The State Library Victoria in Melbourne

The UNESCO's City of Literature programme is a part of the wider Creative Cities Network. The list consists of 53 cities across 6 continents that have played a significant role in the literary tradition of the host countries. Each city nominated to the list has generally met a set of criteria described by UNESCO, such as producing notable writers and authors, constructing important libraries and bookstores, hosting literature festivals and programmes, and publishing major literary works. The nominations are reviewed every four years.

The Network was launched in 2004, and now has member cities in seven creative fields. The other creative fields are: Crafts and Folk Arts, Design, Film, Gastronomy, Media Arts, and Music.

== Criteria ==
To be approved as a City of Literature, cities need to meet a number of criteria set by UNESCO.

Designated UNESCO Cities of Literature share similar characteristics:

- Quality, quantity, and diversity of publishing in the city
- Quality and quantity of educational programmes focusing on domestic or foreign literature at primary, secondary, and tertiary levels
- Literature, drama, and/or poetry playing an important role in the city
- Hosting literary events and festivals, which promote domestic and foreign literature
- Existence of libraries, bookstores, and public or private cultural centres, which preserve, promote, and disseminate domestic and foreign literature
- Involvement by the publishing sector in translating literary works from diverse national languages and foreign literature
- Active involvement of traditional and new media in promoting literature and strengthening the market for literary products

Cities submit bids to UNESCO to be designated a City of Literature. The designations are monitored and reviewed every four years by UNESCO.

== About the cities ==
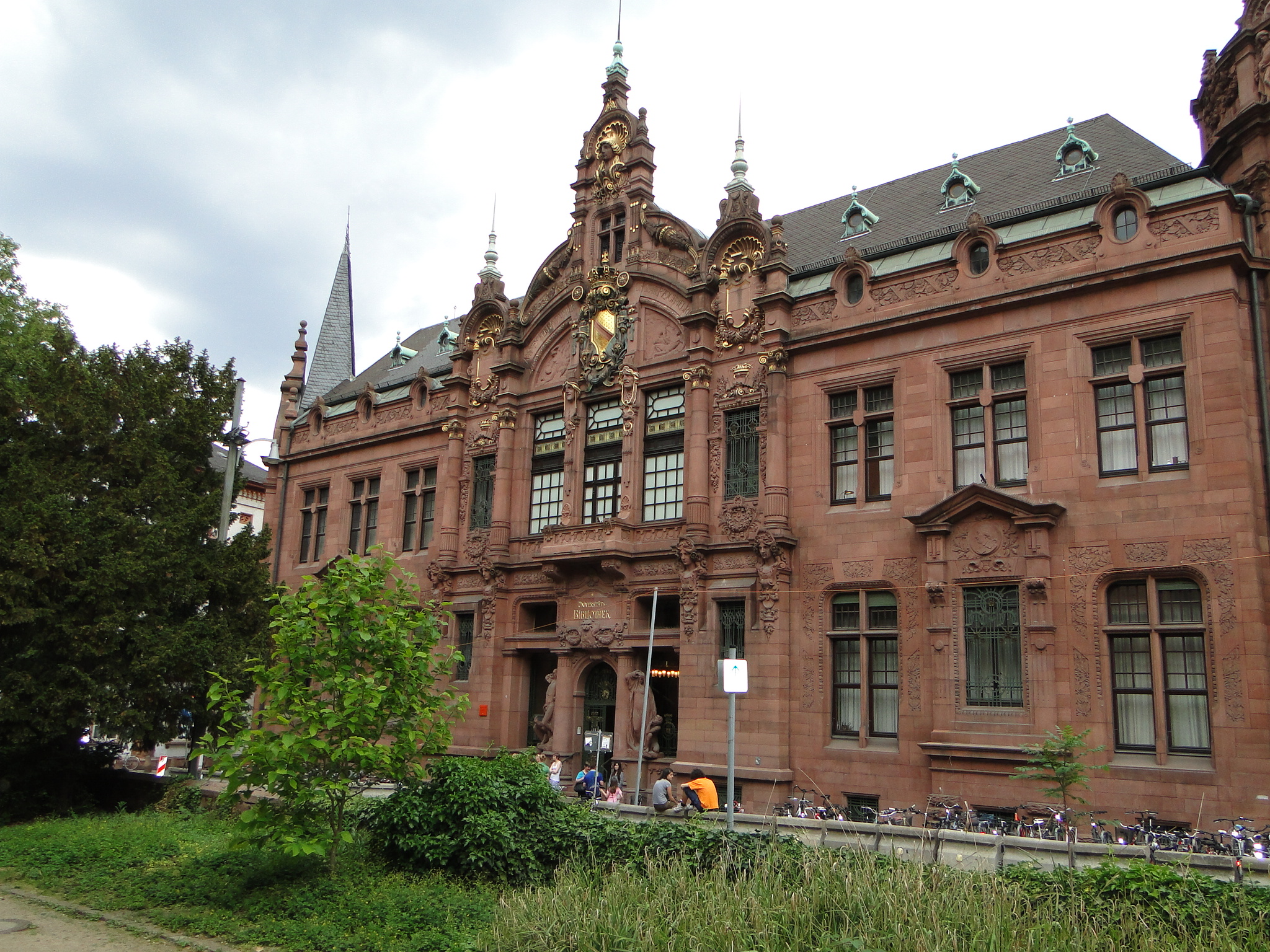
Heidelberg University Library

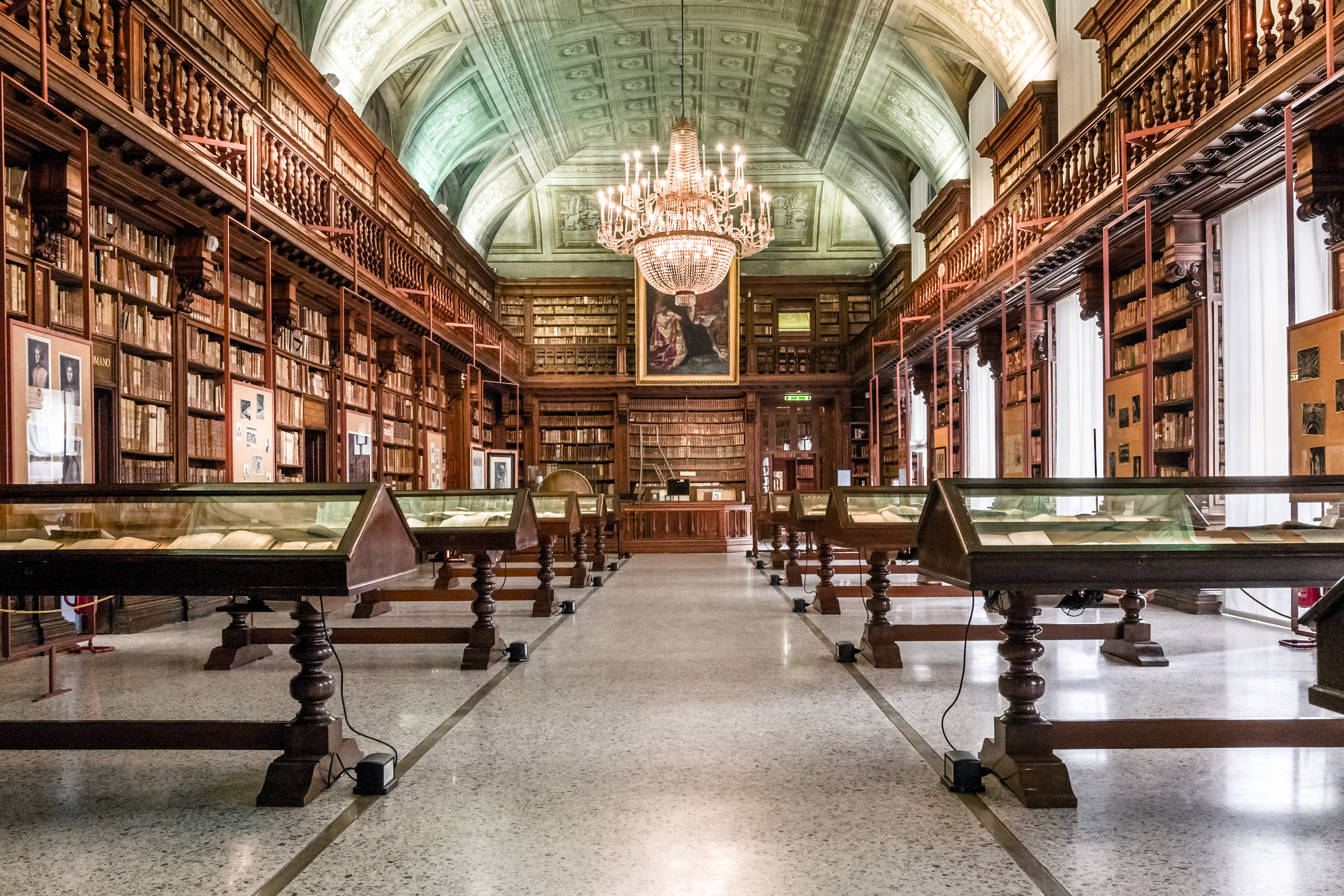
Braidense National Library in Milan

In October 2004, Edinburgh was named the first UNESCO literary city. This followed a presentation made at Unesco's office in Paris, where Edinburgh's poet laureate Stewart Conn read a poem written for the occasion. As well as having its own poet laureate — the Makar, the city hosts the annual International Book Festival. The city was expected to be given accreditation in April 2005.

Ljubljana runs their Library Under the Treetops at various locations across the city, including Tivoli City Park and Zvezda Park. These sites offer a selection of book genres and several domestic and foreign newspapers and magazines.

Manchester is home to the "world-class" Central Library and the "historic gems" of The Portico, John Rylands, and Chetham's.

Melbourne is home to Australia's oldest public library, the State Library of Victoria; the Centre of Books, Writing and Ideas, The Wheeler Centre; and was home to the world's biggest book shop, Cole's Book Arcade, which opened at the turn of the twentieth century.

Prague's significant intellectual and creative resources include: the book design, illustration, typography, and graphic design fields. It also has the National Library of the Czech Republic, as well as over 200 libraries, which is considered one of Europe's highest concentrations of bookshops, and the Prague Writers' Festival.

The Welsh town of Aberystwyth (together with the surrounding county of Ceredigion) was named City of Literature in October 2022, despite not being a 'city'. As well as having a strong tradition of festivals and poetry, Aberystwyth is also the home of the National Library of Wales and several other literary centres.

== Cities of Literature ==
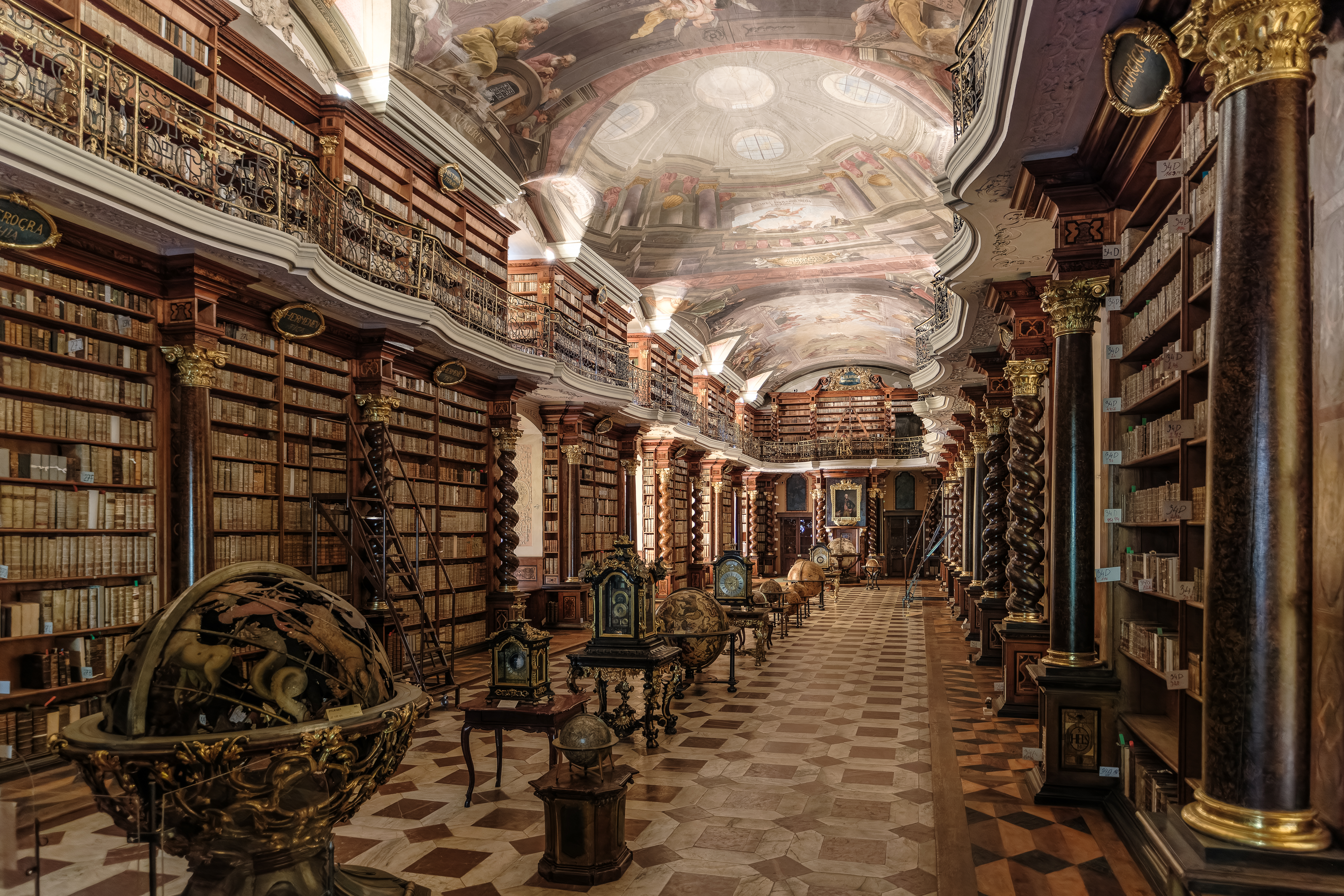
The National Library in Prague

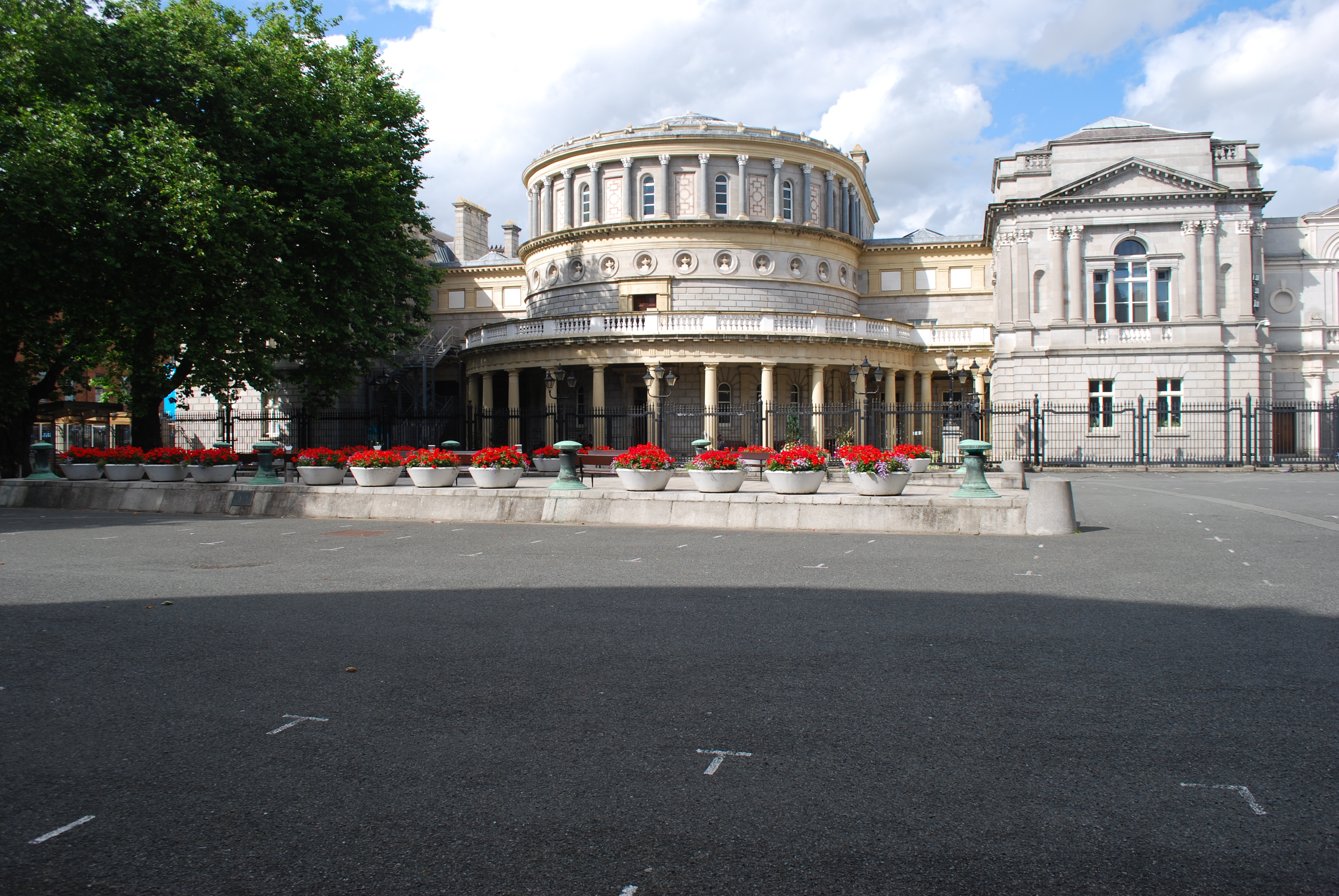
The National Library in Dublin

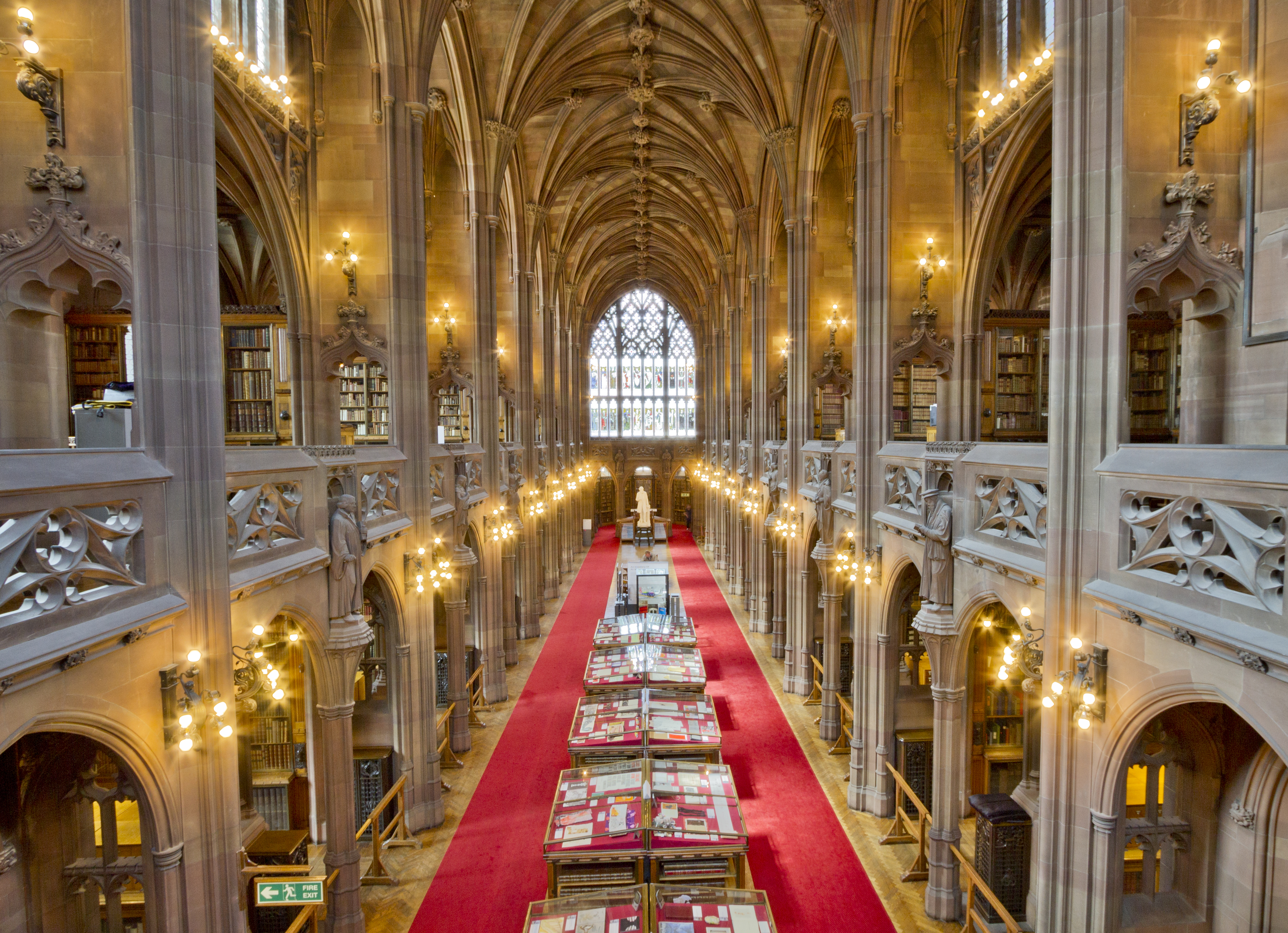
John Rylands Library in Manchester

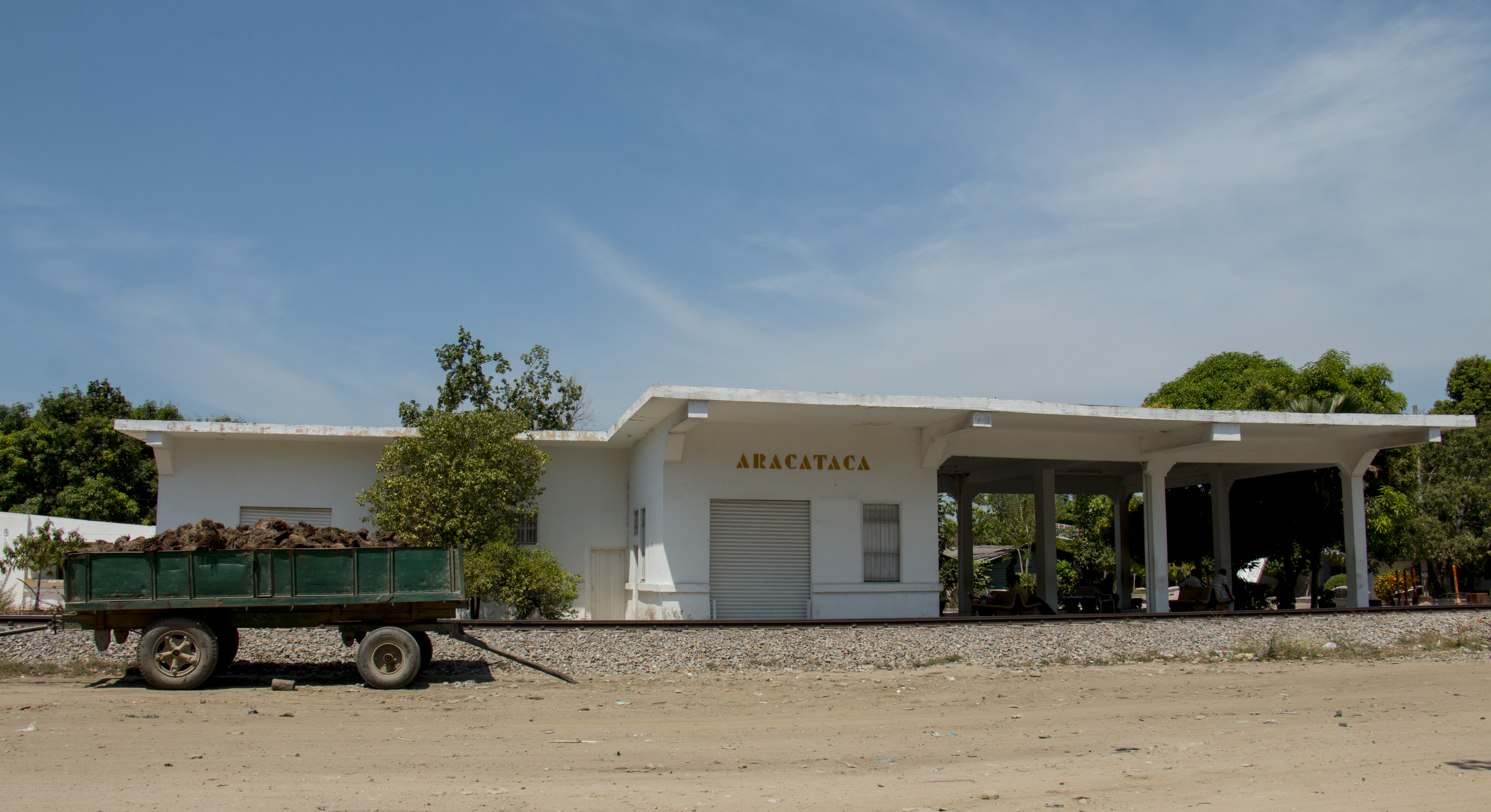
Aracataca train station, in Colombia, is one of the settings of a Gabriel García Márquez novel.

11 countries have multiple Cities of Literature; 10 of them have two, while the United Kingdom has six. (One, Aberystwyth being a town).

Members of the Creative Cities Network are:

City	Country	Year of inscription
Aberystwyth	United Kingdom	2025
Abuja	Nigeria	2025
Angoulême	France	2019
Baghdad	Iraq	2015
Barcelona	Spain	2015
Beirut	Lebanon	2019
Bremen	Germany	2023
Bucheon	Korea Republic	2017
Buffalo City	South Africa	2023
Celje	Slovenia	2025
Conakry	Guinea	2025
Dublin	Ireland	2010
Dumaguete	Philippines	2025
Dunedin	New Zealand	2014
Durban	South Africa	2017
Edinburgh	United Kingdom	2004
Exeter	United Kingdom	2019
Gdańsk	Poland	2025
Gothenburg	Sweden	2021
Granada	Spain	2014
Heidelberg	Germany	2014
Hobart	Australia	2023
Iași	Romania	2023
Iowa City	United States	2008
Jakarta	Indonesia	2021
Kahramanmaraş	Turkey	2025
Kozhikode	India	2023
Kraków	Poland	2013
Kuhmo	Finland	2019
Kutaisi	Georgia	2023
Lahore	Pakistan	2019
Leeuwarden	Netherlands	2019
Lillehammer	Norway	2017
Ljubljana	Slovenia	2015
Lund	Sweden	2025
Lviv	Ukraine	2015
Lyon	France	2023
Manchester	United Kingdom	2017
Melbourne	Australia	2008
Milan	Italy	2017
Montevideo	Uruguay	2015
Nanjing	China	2019
Norwich	United Kingdom	2012
Nottingham	United Kingdom	2015
Óbidos	Portugal	2015
Odesa	Ukraine	2019
Okayama	Japan	2023
Prague	Czech Republic	2014
Québec City	Canada	2017
Reykjavík	Iceland	2011
Rio de Janeiro	Brazil	2023
San Luis Potosí	Mexico	2025
Seattle	United States	2017
Sulaymaniyah	Iraq	2019
Taif	Saudi Arabia	2023
Tangier	Morocco	2025
Tartu	Estonia	2015
Tukums	Latvia	2023
Ulyanovsk	Russia	2015
Utrecht	Netherlands	2017
Vilnius	Lithuania	2021
Wonju	Korea Republic	2019
Wrocław	Poland	2019

== See also ==
- Creative Cities Network
- City of Crafts and Folk Arts
- City of Music
- City of Film
- Design Cities
- City of Gastronomy
- City of Media Arts
