= City of Music (UNESCO) =

UNESCO Cities of Music

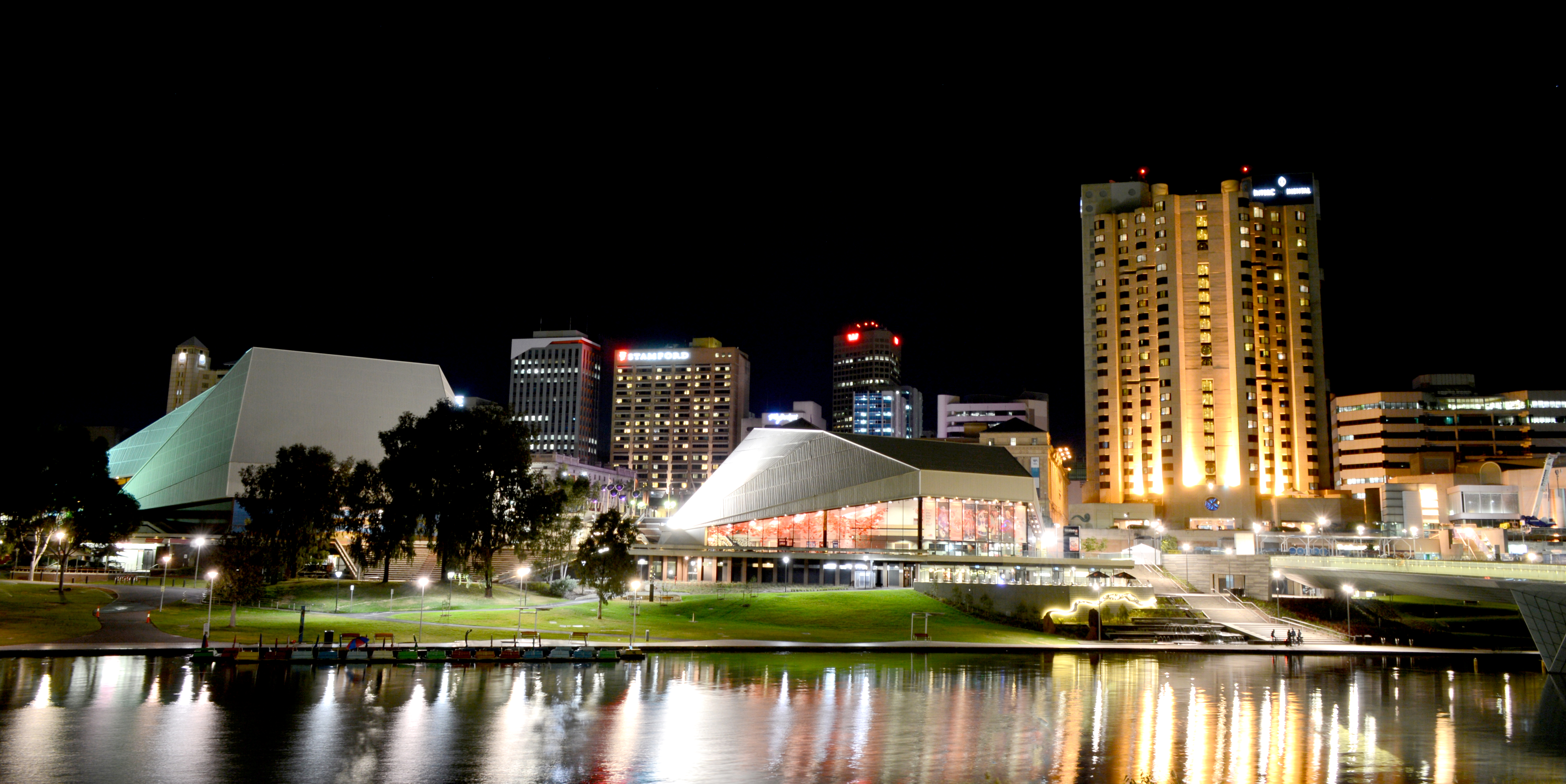
Adelaide Festival Centre in South Australia

City of Music is a designation given by UNESCO to a number of cities around the world "that have identified creativity as a strategic factor for sustainable urban development", to promote cooperation among them and to help establish further music-related activities in the cities. The network is a sub-network of the wider UNESCO Creative Cities Network, or UCCN. The UCCN launched in 2004, and has member cities in seven creative fields. The other fields are: Crafts and Folk Art, Design, Film, Gastronomy, Literature, and Media Arts.

== Cities of Music values ==
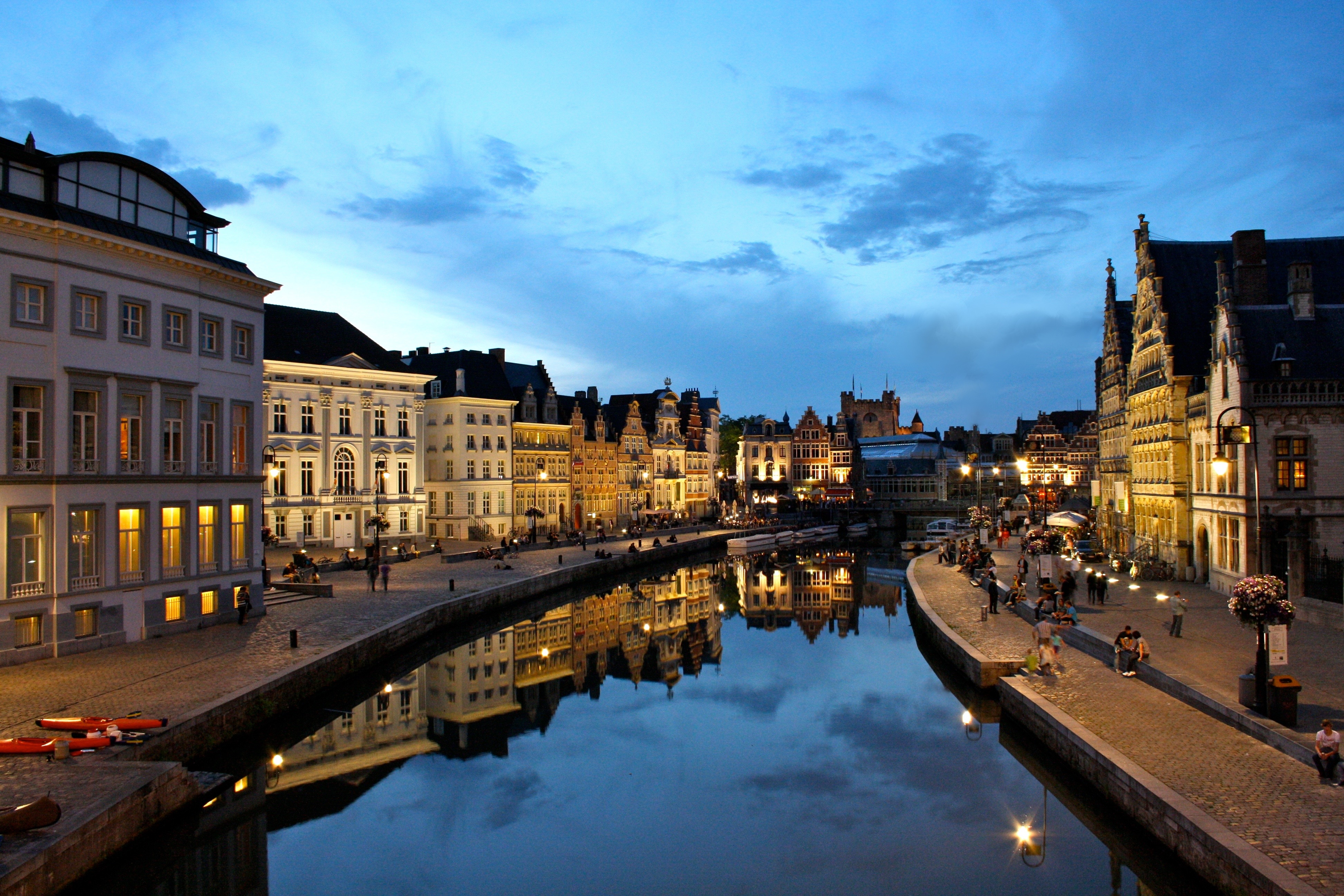
Korenlei and Graslei in Ghent, Belgium

The purpose of the UNESCO Creative City Network is to use creativity to drive the sustainable development of cities.

== About the cities ==
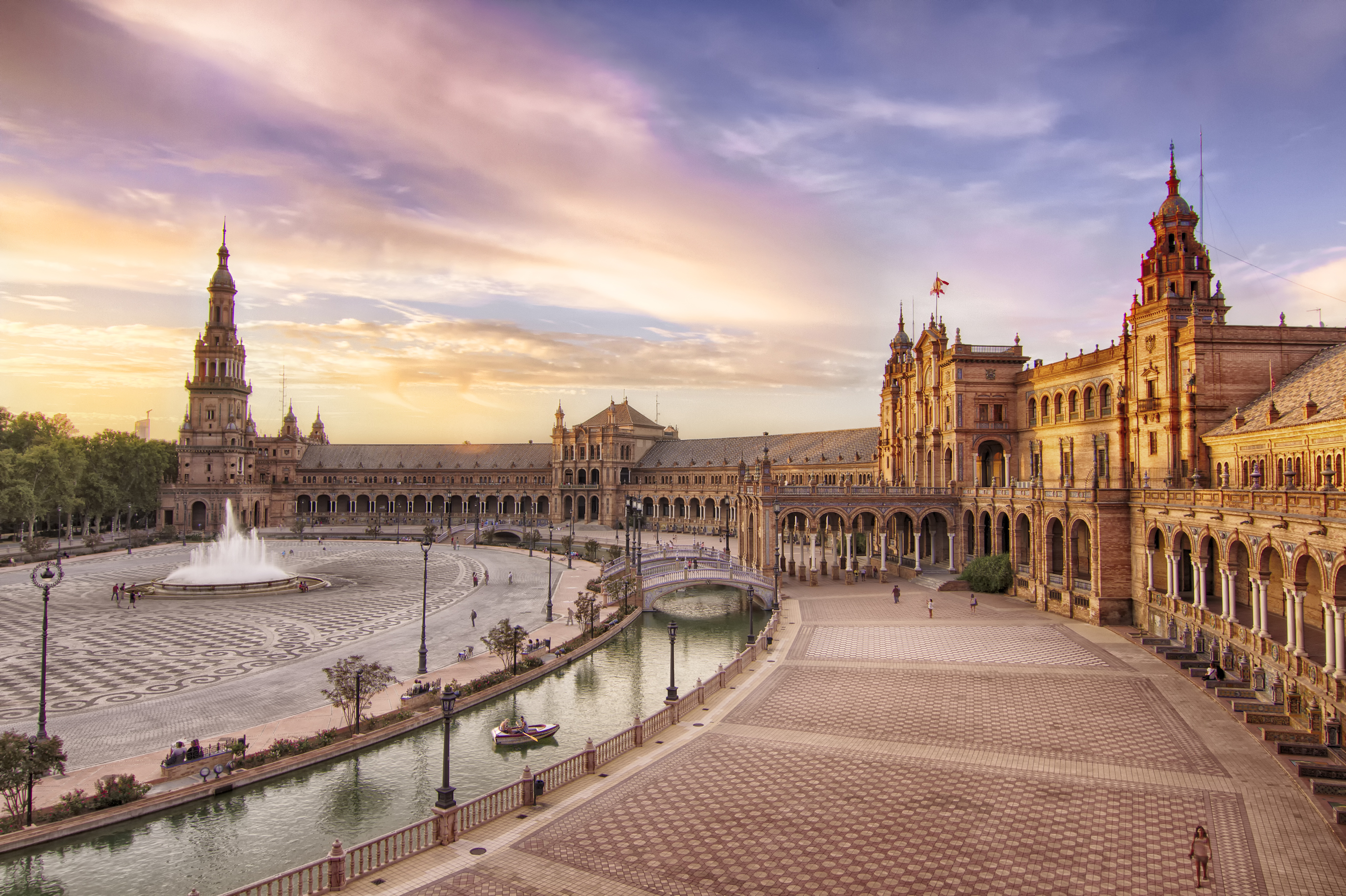
Plaza de España in Seville, Spain

In March 2006, Seville was designated as the first City of Music. Bologna was named approximately two months later.

Seville has a "legendary Flamenco scene," and UNESCO lists Flamenco as an "intangible cultural heritage."

Hamamatsu is the founding city of musical instrument companies Yamaha, Kawai, and Roland. It has also a Museum of Musical Instruments.

Liverpool—"the city that spawned The Beatles"—earned its designation due to music's "place in the heart of the city's life." UNESCO also noted a "clearly defined" music, education, and skills strategy for young people.

Idanha-a-Nova "lives by the rhythm of music," Ghent is a "city full of culture," and Auckland is the "beating heart of New Zealand's music industry."

According to Lonely Planet, Daegu is a "pleasant and progressive place," and Leiria is an "agreeable mixture of medieval and modern".

Lonely Planet describes Adelaide as "sophisticated, cultured, and neat-casual". In 2024, after the historic pub and popular live music venue Crown and Anchor was threatened with demolition and then saved after extensive public backlash and protests, the state government introduced laws to protect live music venues in Adelaide city centre. Part of the justification for this was given as the city's status as a City of Music.

Gwalior's Mankutuhal, a historic 15th century treatise on music was complied in 1488 which later become fundamental structure for Hindustani classical music. Dhrupad was first invented in Gwalior by Man Singh. It is globally regarded as the birthplace of the first Hindustani classical gharana, the Gwalior Gharana, the oldest and one of the most influential schools of Hindustani classical music. This gharana laid down the structured form of khayal singing, which remains central to classical performances across India today. It has India's only music university named as Raja Man Singh Tomar Music University, dedicated to Indian Classical Music and other art forms along with the oldest music college in India the Madhav Music College, established in 1918. City also has several music colleges and academies solely dedicated to music.

== Cities of Music ==
As of 2024, there are 75 Cities of Music. Nine countries have two Cities of Music, (Note: Brazil, Cuba, France, Germany, Poland, Russia, South Korea, Spain, and Turkey.) while six countries have three member cities. (Note: Chile, India, Italy, Mexico, Portugal, and the United Kingdom.) Colombia is the only country with four Cities of Music.

The Cities of Music are:

City	Country	Year
Abu Dhabi	United Arab Emirates	2021
Adelaide	Australia	2015
Almaty	Kazakhstan	2017
Amarante	Portugal	2017
Ambon	Indonesia	2019
Auckland	New Zealand	2017
Banja Luka	Bosnia & Herzegovina	2023
Batoumi	Georgia	2021
Belfast	United Kingdom	2021
Bissau	Guinea-Bissau	2023
Bogotá	Colombia	2012
Bologna	Italy	2006
Bolzano	Italy	2023
Brazzaville	Congo	2013
Brno	Czech Republic	2017
Bydgoszcz	Poland	2023
Caracas	Venezuela	2023
Chennai	India	2017
Concepción	Chile	2023
Da Lat	Vietnam	2023
Daegu	South Korea	2017
Essaouira	Morocco	2019
Évian-les-Bains	France	2025
Frutillar	Chile	2017
Ghent	Belgium	2009
Glasgow	United Kingdom	2008
Gwalior	India	2023
Hamamatsu	Japan	2014
Hanover	Germany	2014
Havana	Cuba	2019
Huancayo	Peru	2021
Ibagué	Colombia	2021
Idanha-a-Nova	Portugal	2015
Ipoh	Malaysia	2023
Kansas City	United States	2017
Katowice	Poland	2015
Kazan	Russia	2019
Kharkiv	Ukraine	2021
Kingston	Jamaica	2015
Kinshasa	Democratic Republic of Congo	2015
Kırşehir	Turkey	2019
Kisumu	Kenya	2025
Korhogo	Ivory Coast	2025
Kyiv	Ukraine	2025
Lalitpur	Nepal	2025
Leiria	Portugal	2019
Liège	Belgium	2025
Liverpool	United Kingdom	2015
Llíria	Spain	2019
London	Canada	2021
Mannheim	Germany	2014
Medellín	Colombia	2015
Metz	France	2019
Mexicali	Mexico	2023
Montreux	Switzerland	2023
Morelia	Mexico	2017
New Orleans	United States	2025
Nikšić	Montenegro	2025
Norrköping	Sweden	2017
Pesaro	Italy	2017
Port Louis	Mauritius	2021
Port of Spain	Trinidad and Tobago	2019
Praia	Cape Verde	2017
Ramallah	Palestine	2019
Recife	Brazil	2021
Salvador	Brazil	2015
Sanandaj	Iran	2019
Şanlıurfa	Turkey	2023
Santiago de Cuba	Cuba	2021
Santo Domingo	Dominican Republic	2019
Seville	Spain	2006
Suphan Buri	Thailand	2023
Tallinn	Estonia	2021
Tongyeong	South Korea	2015
Toulouse	France	2023
Valledupar	Colombia	2019
Valparaíso	Chile	2019
Varanasi	India	2015
Varaždin	Croatia	2023
Veliky Novgorod	Russia	2023
Veszprém	Hungary	2019
Vranje	Serbia	2019
Wuxi	China	2025
Xalapa	Mexico	2021

== See also ==
- City of Gastronomy
- City of Literature
- City of Film
- Design Cities (UNESCO)
- City of Crafts and Folk Arts
- City of Media Arts
