= City of Crafts and Folk Arts =

UNESCO project

UNESCO's City of Crafts and Folk Arts project is part of the wider Creative Cities Network, founded in 2004, which designates cities worldwide that have made unique contributions to the field of crafts and folk arts.

The current designated Cities of Crafts and Folk Arts of UNESCO are:

City	Country	Year	Notes
Al-Ahsa	Saudi Arabia	2015	Ancient tradition of handicrafts, including textiles from palm trees, pottery, weaving, and joinery.
Andenne	Belgium	2025	Medieval traditions of ceramics such as the blanche derle, thanks to the rich clay subsoils of the Mosan Valley.
Areguá	Paraguay	2019	Known for its pottery, home to 450 pottery workshops.
Aswan	Egypt	2005	Heritage of crafts and folk arts, including beadwork, tablecloth production, palm branch and leaf creations, as well as clay and needle-work products.
Ayacucho	Peru	2019	Known for its various crafts such as retablo, tapestry, Huamanga stone carving, pottery, textiles and embroidery.
Baguio	Philippines	2017	Varied traditions in weaving, woodcarving, silver crafting, and tattooing and tattoo art.
Ballarat	Australia	2019	Historical and modern reputation as a melting pot for various forms and traditions of Indigenous Australian art.
Bamyan	Afghanistan	2015	Unique history of crafts influenced by Muslim and Buddhist cultures that are still practiced in the area today.
Bandar Abbas	Iran	2019	History of creative arts such as practical and marine crafts, local clothing, and local musical instruments.
Barcelos	Portugal	2017	Origin of the famous Rooster of Barcelos.
Biella	Italy	2019	History of wool manufacturing and textile manufacturing.
Bobo-Dioulasso	Burkina Faso	2025	Important hub for masks and textiles, such as Koko dunda.
Bukhara	Uzbekistan	2023	Known for its golden embroidery, ceramics, jewellery, and woodwork.
Cairo	Egypt	2017	Ancient history of specializing in pottery, glassblowing, coppersmith, ceramic and jewelry.
Caldas da Rainha	Portugal	2019	Center of ceramic production.
Carrara	Italy	2017	World-renowned white marble that has influenced Carrara's development as a center of crafts in Tuscany and in Italy.
Castelo Branco	Portugal	2023	Known for its distinctive embroidery.
Cheongju	South Korea	2025	Famous for its ceramics, metalworks and papercrafts, and the provenance of Jikji, the world's oldest known printed book.
Chiang Mai	Thailand	2017	History as a trade center and a region of cultural diversity that has influenced a craft culture of pottery, silverwork, woodcarving, silk embroidery, and lacquerware.
Chordeleg	Ecuador	2017	Unique precious metal work, footwear manufacturing, pottery, and toquilla straw weaving that has been passed down through generations through oral tradition.
Durán	Ecuador	2015	Long history of syncretism between urban art and murals and traditional Ecuadorian art and craft.
Echizen	Japan	2025	Known for the local production of handmade paper (washi), kitchen knives and chests of drawers.
Fabriano	Italy	2013	Status as a center for crafts such as pottery, weaving, blacksmithing, and paper making since the 12th century.
Faenza	Italy	2025	Internationally renowned for its historic ceramics tradition, combining traditional craftsmanship with contemporary design, sustainable innovation and international cultural exchange.
Gabrovo	Bulgaria	2017	One of the largest craft centers in Bulgaria, specifically in woodcarving and wool weaving.
Hangzhou	China	2012	Ancient history of silk and tea production, as well as porcelain and bronze sculptures, known as China's Tea Capital.
Hebron	Palestine	2025	Renown for its pottery, ceramics, blown glass, embroidery and stone carving traditions.
Höhr-Grenzhausen	Germany	2025	Hub for the Kannenbäckerland ceramic-producing cultural landscape.
Hội An	Vietnam	2023	Known for Bài chòi, a folk artform combining dance, theatre and song.
Icheon	South Korea	2010	Historical and modern status as the center of Korea's ceramic and pottery crafting.
Isfahan	Iran	2015	Various crafts including carpet weaving, metalwork, woodwork, ceramics, painting and inlay works of various kinds.
Jacmel	Haiti	2014	Traditions of painting, sculpture-making, and giant papier-mâché masks, as well as the place of origin of the Jacmel painting school in Haitian art.
Jaipur	India	2015	Historical crafts of jewelry making, carving, and painting that have been a center of trade since the early 18th century, with 53,500 workshops practicing these crafts today.
Jingdezhen	China	2014	Called the "Porcelain Capital" for its ancient history of porcelain work.
Jinju	South Korea	2019	History of wooden furniture-making, ornamental knife-making, metal crafts and silk.
João Pessoa	Brazil	2017	Unique production of cotton fabric, as well as production of pottery, embroidery, and crochet.
Kanazawa	Japan	2009	Samurai-inspired arts culture, unique craftwork such as the kaga-yuzen silk dying technique.
Kargopol	Russia	2019	Traditional textile embroidery, artisanal wood and bark carving, and clay-fired colored figures known as Kargopol toys, all of which form the most important sector of the city's economy today.
Kütahya	Turkey	2017	Unique art of ceramic çini making which dominates the city's landscape.
Limoges	France	2017	History of ceramics, enamel, and glass-making, as well as a more recently founded porcelain industry.
Lubango	Angola	2025	Famous for the production of samakaka textiles and nonkako sandals.
Lubumbashi	Democratic Republic of Congo	2015	Unique copper and malachite crafts created in the city, with over 50 workshops dedicated to malachite carving.
Madaba	Jordan	2017	Largest number of mosaics discovered in their original location in the world, including its Byzantine and Umayyad mosaics and the oldest-surviving description of the Holy Land.
Masaya	Nicaragua	2025	Known as a center for the production of textiles, and for hosting the longest traditional arts and crafts festival in the country.
Montecristi	Ecuador	2023	Famous for the production of handwoven toquilla hats.
Nan	Thailand	2025	Nan is famous for its intricate traditional weaving (notably the Teen Chok and Lai Nam Lai patterns), silver craftsmanship, and traditional woodcarving.
Nassau	Bahamas	2014	Bahamian cultural and creative traditions of straw weaving and Junkanoo craftmaking formed from a blend of Indigenous and African cultural traditions.
Ouagadougou	Burkina Faso	2017	Traditional craft of bronze and copper casting and crafting that forms a major sector of the city's economy even today.
Paducah	United States	2013	History and contributions to the craft of quilt making in the United States.
Pekalongan	Indonesia	2014	Cultural history and importance of Batik crafts and cloths to the city and its identity.
Perth	United Kingdom	2021	Craft is an integral part of this area’s history. Mediaeval Perth was a centre of craft production and trade. By the early 1500s, Perth was known as a ‘Craftis Toun’. This reputation has stayed with the region throughout the centuries, and today there is still a thriving and reputable Craft and Folk Art sector.
Ponorogo	Indonesia	2025	Known for its traditional Reog Ponorogo dance.
Porto-Novo	Benin	2017	History and unique practice of various crafts such as wickerwork, blacksmithing, pottery, and manufacturing of musical instruments in the city, with 42 historical craft guilds in the city.
Safi	Morocco	2025	Traditionally established pottery tradition and home to the National Museum of Ceramics.
San Cristobal de Las Casas	Mexico	2015	Preservation of Indigenous Mexican crafts and arts such as embroidery, pottery, blacksmithing, woodcarving, and amber craftmaking.
Santa Fe	United States	2005	Native American crafts of jewelry, pottery, and weaving and the trade fairs in these crafts that have become an integral part of the city's identity, as well as Spanish colonial art such as folk dance, straw applique, and tinwork.
Santa Marta	Colombia	2018	Site of almost 12 ancient Caribbean cultures, known for their Wayúu handcrafts and Tayrona handmade gold pieces.
Sarchí	Costa Rica	2025	Famous for its colorful arts and crafts and their applications in the local agriculture, for example in traditionally crated ox carts.
Sharjah	United Arab Emirates	2019	Traditional craft of "Talli" weaving.
Sheki	Azerbaijan	2017	Status as the center of silk production and textiles in the Caucasus, as well as other traditional crafts such as wood-framed stained glass and pottery.
Sifnos	Greece	2025	Long established ceramic traditions and pottery production culture.
Sokodé	Togo	2017	Renowned for its art of weaving.
Srinagar	India	2021	Centuries old traditional handcrafted weaving arts such as the Pashmina shawl, as well as other handicrafts such as handbags, lampshades, and other handcrafted home decor items.
Sukhothai	Thailand	2019	Culturally important artisanal products of gold and silver ornaments, textile weaving, and ceramic and Sangkhalok wares.
Surakarta	Indonesia	2023	Known for traditional batik textile production.
Suzhou	China	2014	History and culture of crafts in embroidery, carving, papermaking, painting, printing, and calligraphy.
Tamba-Sasayama	Japan	2015	Ancient history of unique tanba-yaki pottery, a source of local pride.
Tetouan	Morocco	2017	History of crafts such as Zellige, Taajira embroidery, encrusted and painted wood and wrought ironwork.
Trinidad	Cuba	2019	History of a fibre fabrics industry.
Tunis	Tunisia	2017	Known for its artisan souks that line alleyways.
Ulaanbaatar	Mongolia	2023	Significant for traditional crafts such as national clothing, felt crafts and folk dance.
Viljandi	Estonia	2019	Various crafts including blacksmithing, ceramics, and wool.

== See also ==
- Creative Cities Network
- City of Film
- City of Gastronomy
- City of Literature
- City of Music (UNESCO)
- Design Cities (UNESCO)
- City of Media Arts
