= Design Cities (UNESCO) =

Recognition conferred by UNESCO

UNESCO's Design Cities project is part of the wider Creative Cities Network. The Network launched in 2004, and has member cities in seven creative fields. The other fields are: Crafts and Folk Art, Music, Film, Gastronomy, Literature, and Media Arts.

== Criteria for UNESCO Design Cities ==
To be approved as a Design City, cities need to meet a number of criteria set by UNESCO.

Designated UNESCO Design Cities share similar characteristics such as having an established design industry; cultural landscape maintained by design and the built environment (architecture, urban planning, public spaces, monuments, transportation); design schools and design research centers; practicing groups of designers with a continuous activity at a local and national level; experience in hosting fairs, events and exhibits dedicated to design; opportunity for local designers and urban planners to take advantage of local materials and urban/natural conditions; design-driven creative industries such as architecture and interiors, fashion and textiles, jewelry and accessories, interaction design, urban design, sustainable design.

There are 44 Cities of Design:

| City | Country | Year of Inscription |
|---|---|---|
| Asahikawa | Japan | 2019 |
| Ashgabat | Turkmenistan | 2023 |
| Baku | Azerbaijan | 2019 |
| Bandung | Indonesia | 2015 |
| Bangkok | Thailand | 2019 |
| Beijing | China | 2012 |
| Berlin | Germany | 2006 |
| Bilbao | Spain | 2014 |
| Brasília | Brazil | 2017 |
| Budapest | Hungary | 2015 |
| Buenos Aires | Argentina | 2005 |
| Cape Town | South Africa | 2017 |
| Cebu City | Philippines | 2019 |
| Cetinje | Montenegro | 2023 |
| Chiang Rai | Thailand | 2023 |
| Chongqing | China | 2023 |
| Curitiba | Brazil | 2014 |
| Daugavpils | Latvia | 2025 |
| Detroit | United States | 2015 |
| Dubai | United Arab Emirates | 2018 |
| Dundee | United Kingdom | 2014 |
| Fortaleza | Brazil | 2019 |
| Geelong | Australia | 2017 |
| Granada | Nicaragua | 2023 |
| Graz | Austria | 2011 |
| Hanoi | Vietnam | 2019 |
| Helsinki | Finland | 2014 |
| Istanbul | Turkey | 2017 |
| Kaunas | Lithuania | 2015 |
| Kobe | Japan | 2008 |
| Kolding | Denmark | 2017 |
| Kortrijk | Belgium | 2017 |
| Kuala Lumpur | Malaysia | 2025 |
| La Spezia | Italy | 2025 |
| Medellín | Colombia | 2018 |
| Mexico City | Mexico | 2017 |
| Montreal | Canada | 2006 |
| Muharraq | Bahrain | 2019 |
| Nagoya | Japan | 2008 |
| Puebla | Mexico | 2015 |
| Querétaro | Mexico | 2019 |
| Riyadh | Saudi Arabia | 2025 |
| Saint-Etienne | France | 2010 |
| San José | Costa Rica | 2019 |
| Seoul | South Korea | 2010 |
| Shanghai | China | 2010 |
| Shenzhen | China | 2008 |
| Singapore | Singapore | 2015 |
| Turin | Italy | 2014 |
| Valencia | Spain | 2023 |
| Whanganui | New Zealand | 2022 |
| Wuhan | China | 2017 |

== See also ==
- City of Crafts and Folk Arts
- City of Film
- City of Gastronomy
- City of Literature
- City of Music
- City of Media Arts
