= City of Gastronomy =

Recognition conferred by UNESCO

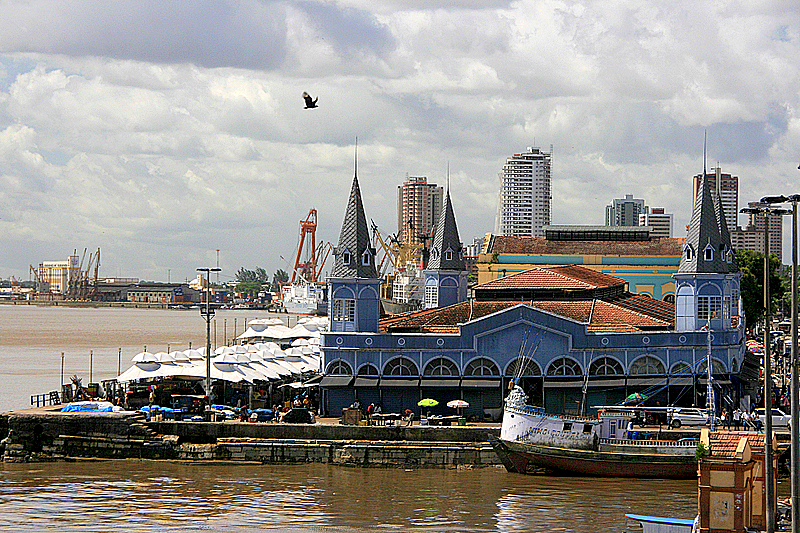
Ver-o-peso Market in Belém

UNESCO's City of Gastronomy project is part of the wider Creative Cities Network. The Network was launched in 2004, and organizes member cities into seven creative fields: Crafts and Folk Art, Design, Film, Gastronomy, Literature, Media Arts, and Music.

== Criteria for Cities of Gastronomy ==
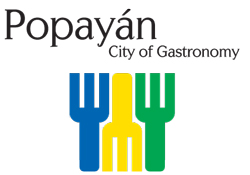
Popayán, Colombia

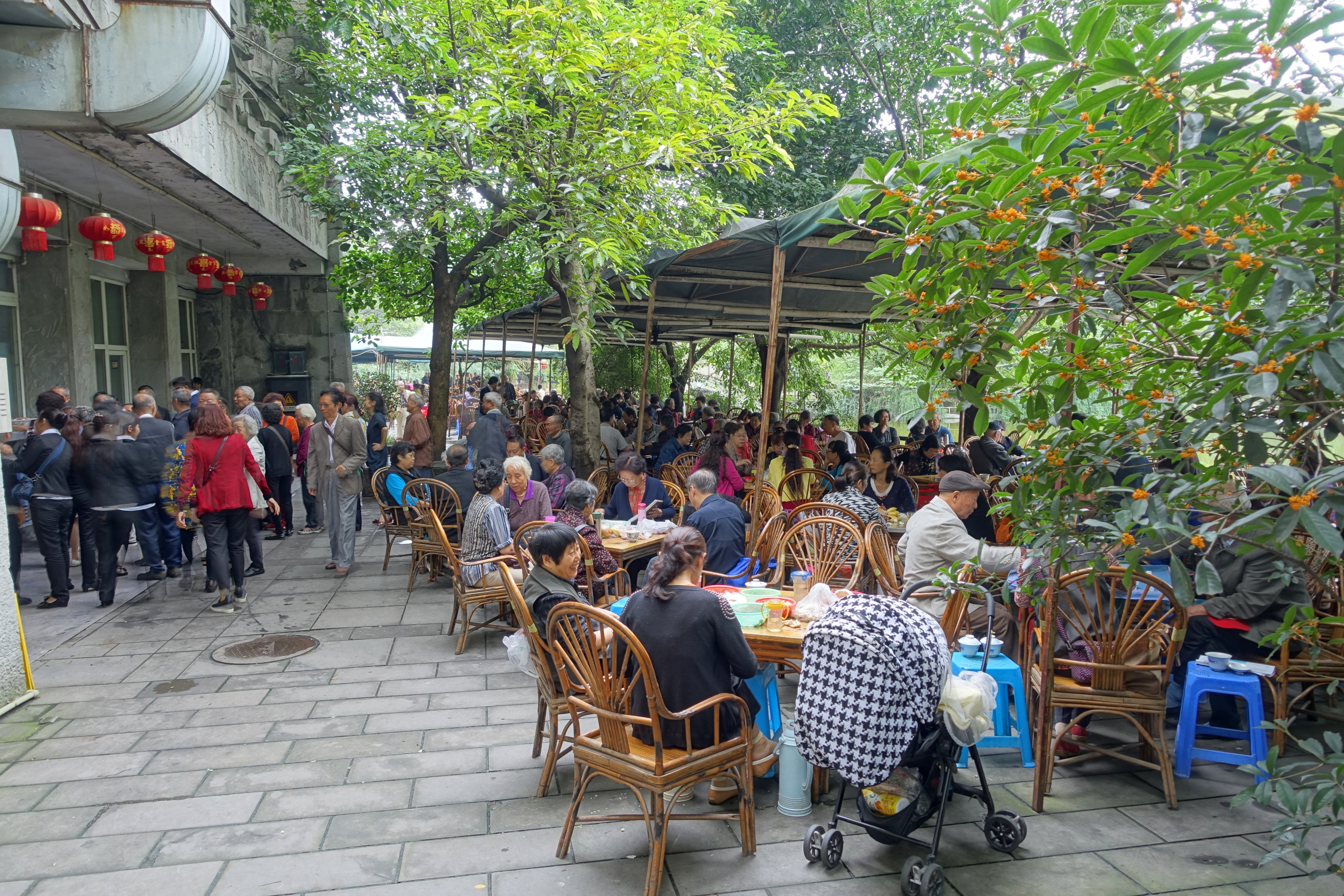
Tea house in Chengdu

To be approved as a City of Gastronomy, cities need to meet a number of criteria set by UNESCO:

- Well-developed gastronomy that is characteristic of the urban centre and/or region;
- Vibrant gastronomy community with numerous traditional restaurants and/or chefs;
- Indigenous ingredients used in traditional cooking;
- Local know-how, traditional culinary practices and methods of cooking that have survived industrial/technological advancement;
- Traditional food markets and traditional food industry;
- Tradition of hosting gastronomic festivals, awards, contests and other broadly-targeted means of recognition;
- Respect for the environment and promotion of sustainable local products;
- Nurturing of public appreciation, promotion of nutrition in educational institutions and inclusion of biodiversity conservation programmes in cooking schools curricula.

Cities submit bids to UNESCO to be designated, with a review every four years.

== List of cities ==
The Cities of Gastronomy are:

City	Country	Year	Notes
Afyonkarahisar	Turkey	2019	For its major industries in food production and animal husbandry and its production of Turkish delight and clotted cream.
Alba	Italy	2017	For its white truffles and vineyards, annual white truffle festival, and its role in the development of the Slow Food movement.
Arequipa	Peru	2019	
Battambang	Cambodia	2023	
Belém	Brazil	2015	
Belo Horizonte	Brazil	2019	For its coffee industry and culture and the mixing of various cultures that flocked to the city influencing its cuisine.
Bendigo	Australia	2019	
Bergamo	Italy	2019	For its history of traditional food production, with advocacy for greater sustainability in enogastronomic production and support of its farmers and traditional methods of agriculture.
Bergen	Norway	2015	For its long history in seafood trade and organic, sustainable seafood gastronomy.
Bohicon	Benin	2021	For its location at the economic crossroads of Benin, production of condiments and sauces, and steps taken to establish gastronomic events and organizations.
Buenaventura	Colombia	2017	For its cuisine of the local Afro-Colombian population, its fruit and seafood production, and promotion of cuisine as a way of healing following the Colombian conflict.
Buraidah	Saudi Arabia	2021	
Burgos	Spain	2015	For its title as the Spanish Capital of Gastronomy since 2013, due to its sustainable gastronomic industries that employ 26% of the city's population.
Chaozhou	China	2023	
Chengdu	China	2010	For its role in Sichuanese cuisine, one of the most popular types of cuisine in China; the birthplace of numerous dishes, including mapo doufu and dan dan noodles; and its distinct and vibrant tea house culture.
Cochabamba	Bolivia	2017	For its role as the most important center of grain production in the Andes, which employs one third of the labor force and has adapted to sustainable methods.
Cuenca	Ecuador	2025	For its harmonious blend of indigenous, European and modern influences with the high altitude of the Andes as a setting.
Dénia	Spain	2015	
Ensenada	Mexico	2015	For its thriving wine and fishing industries, producing 90% of Mexico's wine, and the site of Mexico's second most important port area.
Florianópolis	Brazil	2014	For its hosting of annual food festivals and its historic oyster industry.
Fribourg	Switzerland	2023	
Gangneung	South Korea	2023	
Gaziantep	Turkey	2015	For its importance in the production of cereals, spices, dried fruits, and pistachios to the regional economy, and innovation in renewable and sustainable food production.
Hatay	Turkey	2019	For its rich cuisine as a center of the spice trade, as well as empowerment of women and refugees in the food industry.
Heraklion	Greece	2023	
Huai'an	China	2021	
Hyderabad	India	2019	For its famed and unique Hyderabadi cuisine that combines the native Telugu and Indian Muslim cuisines of the region, that is promoted in the city's network of restaurants and bazaars and celebrated in local festivals such as Ramzan and Bathukamma.
Iloilo City	Philippines	2023	For its diverse array of traditional and modernized cuisine inspired the use of indigenous ingredients that make food unique. It is dubbed as the "Food Haven of the Philippines" and is celebrated for its gastronomic richness in the likes of the La Paz Batchoy, Pancit Molo, Kadyos Baboy Langka (KBL), Chicken Binakol, Laswa, Kansi, Kadyos, manok, kag ubad, Chicken Inasal, Kinilaw, seafoods, various rice and corn-based traditional desserts, and many more.
Jeonju	South Korea	2012	For its long-standing traditions in production of rice, fish, salted fish, and wild greens and vegetables due to its geographic location, and its efforts to support development of traditional food culture through local education.
Kelowna	Canada	2025	For its food and wine culture, and for its inclusion of Syilx Okanagan people's teachings on responsibility to the land and knowledge system around food providing an understanding of stewardship and sustainability.
Kermanshah	Iran	2021	For being a melting pot of various types of cuisine and dishes from the various ethnic groups in Iran, and over 45 events related to local gastronomy and cuisine.
Kuching	Malaysia	2021	For being known center of trade and culinary development between indigenous peoples of the region and other regions of Southeast Asia, promoted by its traditional food bazaars and promotion of cuisine from indigenous cultures.
Lankaran	Azerbaijan	2021	For being the center of gastronomy in the South Caucasus, with important historical industries in cultivation of tea, vegetables, rice, and citrus, as well as in cattle farming, fishing, beekeeping, and grain farming, which are preserved and celebrated in local events.
Launceston	Australia	2021	
Lucknow	India	2025	For its historic Awadhi cuisine as well as its flair for culinary creativity. The city is renowned for many distinct dishes, including its succulent kebabs and distinctive take on biryani.
Macao	China	2017	For its unique blend of Cantonese and Portuguese influence in culinary arts, such as African chicken, a dish which includes Asian ingredients next to peri-peri peppers brought from Mozambique by Portuguese explorers, and for its holding of the Macao Food Festival and other food-related events.
Manizales	Colombia	2025	For its rich agricultural heritage and fusion of indigenous, African and European culinary traditions, and for its role in the history of the Colombian coffee industry.
Matosinhos	Portugal	2025	For its maritime heritage reflected on its seafood and its historical role as a European culinary doorway to and fro the Atlantic Ocean and beyond.
Medina	Saudi Arabia	2025	For its culinary heritage rooted in resiliency and sustainability product of a fertile volcanic soil and supplied by centuries-old trade routes. The city today is famous for its more than 130 varieties of dates, and for its cultural markets such as Suwaiqah and Al-Ainiyah.
Mérida	Mexico	2019	For its variety of culinary festivals and programs, and its development of indigenous Maya gastronomy to develop, preserve, and empower its indigenous cultures.
Nkongsamba	Cameroon	2023	
Östersund	Sweden	2010	For its widely-known gastronomic culture based on sustainable practices linked to its natural surroundings.
Overstrand Hermanus	South Africa	2019	For its wine industry, gastronomic arts events, and its promotion of sustainable food production, such as creating abalone farms to ease pressure on ocean ecosystems.
Portoviejo	Ecuador	2019	For its rich agricultural and maritime industries and development of culinary advancement in the aftermath of earthquakes in 2016.
Panama City	Panama	2017	For its rich culinary history and development of organizations promoting social responsibility through gastronomy.
Paraty	Brazil	2017	For the blending of Portuguese, Indigenous, and African cultures leading to the creation of some of Brazil's most famous cuisine such as paçoca and farofa-de-feijão and its history in making of cachaça.
Parma	Italy	2015	For being the gastronomic center of the "Italian Food Valley", with 30.5% of the city's population employed in sustainable gastronomic and agri-food industries.
Phetchaburi	Thailand	2021	Known as “the City of Three Flavors” derived from three primary local ingredients such as palmyra palm sugar, sea salt, manao paen rampai (lime).
Phuket	Thailand	2015	For being the center of Phuket cuisine, mix of Thai, Chinese, Malay, Indian, Peranakan influenced. Local famous dishes such as Mee Hokkien, Moo Hong, Lo Ba, Bee-Go-Moi, O-awe.
Popayán	Colombia	2005	
Quanzhou	China	2025	
Rasht	Iran	2015	
Rouen	France	2021	For being developed as a cultural hub of Normandy through promotion of its cuisine, especially in the baking and maritime sectors.
Saint Petersburg	Russia	2021	
San Antonio	United States	2017	For its role in the development of the widely-known fusion Tex-Mex cuisine, as well as Mexican cuisine in the United States.
San Javier de Loncomilla	Chile	2025	For its wine heritage thanks to its Mediterranean climate and diversity of grape varieties.
Santa Maria da Feira	Portugal	2021	
Songkhla	Thailand	2025	Culinary heritage shaped by “the City of Two Seas”-Songkhla Lake and the Gulf of Thailand-has created diverse food heritage, from palm groves and rice fields to fishing communities. Has cultivated unique cuisine that blends Thai, Chinese, Muslim, Malay, Persian influences. Famous signature of Songkhla dishes such as Kai Tod Hat Yai, Galorgee, Khai Krob, Koh Yo Sea Bass, Ong Ice Cream, Sampanni.
Shunde	China	2014	One of the cradles of Cantonese cuisine in the Pearl River Delta, with the innovation and development of multiple culinary practices amplified by its lively economy and cultural scene.
Thessaloniki	Greece	2021	For its production of fresh ingredients and feta, Greek yogurt, and olive oil, and its promotion of these products in events.
Tsuruoka	Japan	2014	For the cultivation of mushrooms, bamboo shoots, edamame, and rice from the mountains, and seafood from the ocean playing an important role in the city's development and history.
Tucson	United States	2015	For its culture and development of Sonoran Mexican cuisine.
Usuki	Japan	2021	For its production of miso paste, soy sauce, sake, and shochu liquor, and its role in the global Slow Food movement.
Yangzhou	China	2019	Cradle of Huaiyang cuisine, hosting over 100 food-themed festivals, conferences, and exhibitions, and promotion of its gastronomic heritage.
Zahlé	Lebanon	2013	For its viticulture and production of wine and arak and celebrations of its food history.
Zaragoza	Spain	2025	

== See also ==
- City of Crafts and Folk Arts
- City of Film
- City of Literature
- City of Music
- Design Cities
