= City of Media Arts =

UNESCO designation

UNESCO's City of Media Arts project is part of the wider Creative Cities Network. The Network launched in 2004, and has member cities in seven creative fields. The other fields are: Crafts and Folk Art, Music, Film, Gastronomy, Literature, Media Arts and Design Cities.

The current designated Cities of Media Arts of UNESCO are:

| City | Country | Year of inscription |
|---|---|---|
| Austin | United States | 2015 |
| Braga | Portugal | 2017 |
| Caen | France | 2023 |
| Campina Grande | Brazil | 2021 |
| Casablanca | Morocco | 2023 |
| Changsha | China | 2017 |
| Dakar | Senegal | 2014 |
| Enghien-les-Bains | France | 2013 |
| Guadalajara | Mexico | 2017 |
| Gwangju | South Korea | 2014 |
| Hamar | Norway | 2021 |
| Karlsruhe | Germany | 2019 |
| Košice | Slovakia | 2017 |
| Linz | Austria | 2014 |
| Lyon | France | 2008 |
| Malang | Indonesia | 2025 |
| Modena | Italy | 2021 |
| Namur | Belgium | 2021 |
| Novi Sad | Serbia | 2023 |
| Oulu | Finland | 2023 |
| Santiago de Cali | Colombia | 2020 |
| Sapporo | Japan | 2013 |
| Tbilisi | Georgia | 2021 |
| Tel Aviv-Yafo | Israel | 2014 |
| Toronto | Canada | 2017 |
| Varna | Bulgaria | 2025 |
| Viborg | Denmark | 2019 |
| York | United Kingdom | 2014 |

== See also ==
- Creative Cities Network
- City of Film
- City of Gastronomy
- City of Literature
- City of Crafts and Folk Arts
- City of Music (UNESCO)
- Design Cities (UNESCO)
