= Imaginando =

Audio software company

Imaginando Lda
- Industry: Music technology; Music software; New media art
- Founded: 2014; 12 years ago in Braga, Portugal
- Founders: Nuno Santos
- Headquarters: Braga, Portugal
- Area served: Worldwide
- Products: TKFX, LK, DRC, DLYM, K7D, FRMS, VS, BAM, TV3, GRFX
- Number of employees: 6
- Website: imaginando.pt

Imaginando Lda is a Portuguese company founded in 2014 by Nuno Santos that develops software for music production, sound design, and performance as well as audio-reactive visuals. The company's headquarters is located in Braga, Portugal.

== History ==
Imaginando was founded by Nuno Santos in Braga, Portugal (City of Media Arts of UNESCO), who is the company's current CEO and CTO. The company started as a business initiative with no venture funding. As a solo entrepreneur, he looked for a solution for maintaining a single code base for multiple target devices, thus Qt Framework was adopted.

In 2015 he joined forces with his long time friend Rui Antunes, an analog electronics expert and synthesizer repairer, to create Imaginando’s first synthesizer. Rui developed an analog modeled synthesizer in Pure Data, which served as a base for the development of the DRC (Digital Resistor Capacitor) synthesizer.

During DRC development and stemming from a new media art open call from GNRation, they created a project called “Harpa Laser”. The project consisted of a 2-meter-tall (6.6 ft) iron structure that incorporated 8 lasers in parallel and with a DRC engine running on a Raspberry Pi. This new media art installation debuted in the 2015 Noite Branca, in the streets of Braga.

In 2017, Imaginando ventured on another open call by GNRation, this time turning a piece of antique furniture into a gigantic digital music box.

== Products ==
In 2014, Imaginando released TKFX, a Native Instruments Traktor Dj Controller.

In 2015, Imaginando released LK, an Ableton Live & MIDI Controller.

In 2016, Imaginando released DRC, a polyphonic synthesizer.

In 2018, Imaginando released DLYM, a chorus and flanger effect.

In 2019, Imaginando released K7D, a tape delay audio effect.

In 2020, Imaginando released FRMS, a granular synthesizer that combines granular, subtractive, and FM synthesis.

In 2021, Imaginando released VS, a visual synthesizer that can turn musical compositions into graphical effects (based on GLSL shaders, images and videos), in real time, by taking advantage of incoming audio and MIDI information.

In 2023, Imaginando released BAM - Beat Maker & Music Maker, a groovebox style application that can also host plugins.

In 2024, Imaginando released TV3 - Acid Synth, a synth inspired by the iconic Roland TB-303 bass synthesizer.

In 2025, Imaginando released GRFX - Granular Effects, an audio effect that uses granular synthesis principles to transform sounds into textures, rhythmic patterns, and ambient soundscapes.
