= Khai khrop =

Thai traditional food product

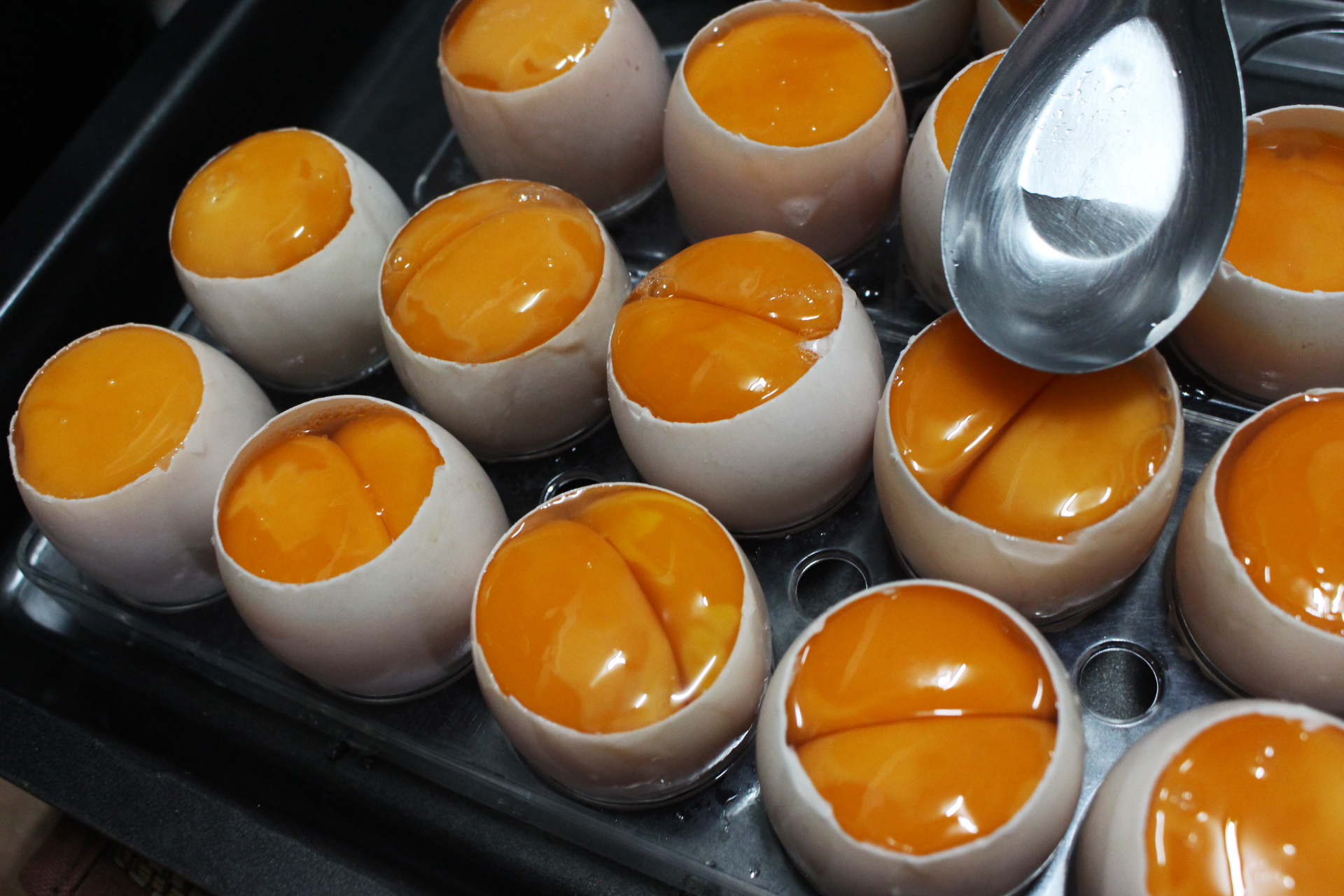
- Alternative names: Khai khu
- Place of origin: Thailand
- Region or state: Songkhla
- Main ingredients: Duck egg yolks in brine

Khai khrop (Thai: ไข่ครอบ, pronounced [kʰàj kʰrɔ̂ːp]; also spelt as kai krob) or khai khu (ไข่คู่, pronounced [kʰàj kʰûː]) is a traditional food product from Songkhla in Southern Thailand. It is made by putting two duck egg yolks into an egg shell that was cut into half, preserved by soaking in brine. Khai khrop are steamed until hard before being eaten with rice or khao tom, or cooked with other foods.

== History ==
In the fishing villages of Songkhla Province, people make fishnets from unbleached cotton yarn. To prevent the threads in the net from getting frayed, and to help it sink in the water, the net is regularly treated with egg white from duck eggs. This creates leftover yolks, and so they are preserved as khai khrop. (ครูฑูรย์, 2012)

== Methods ==
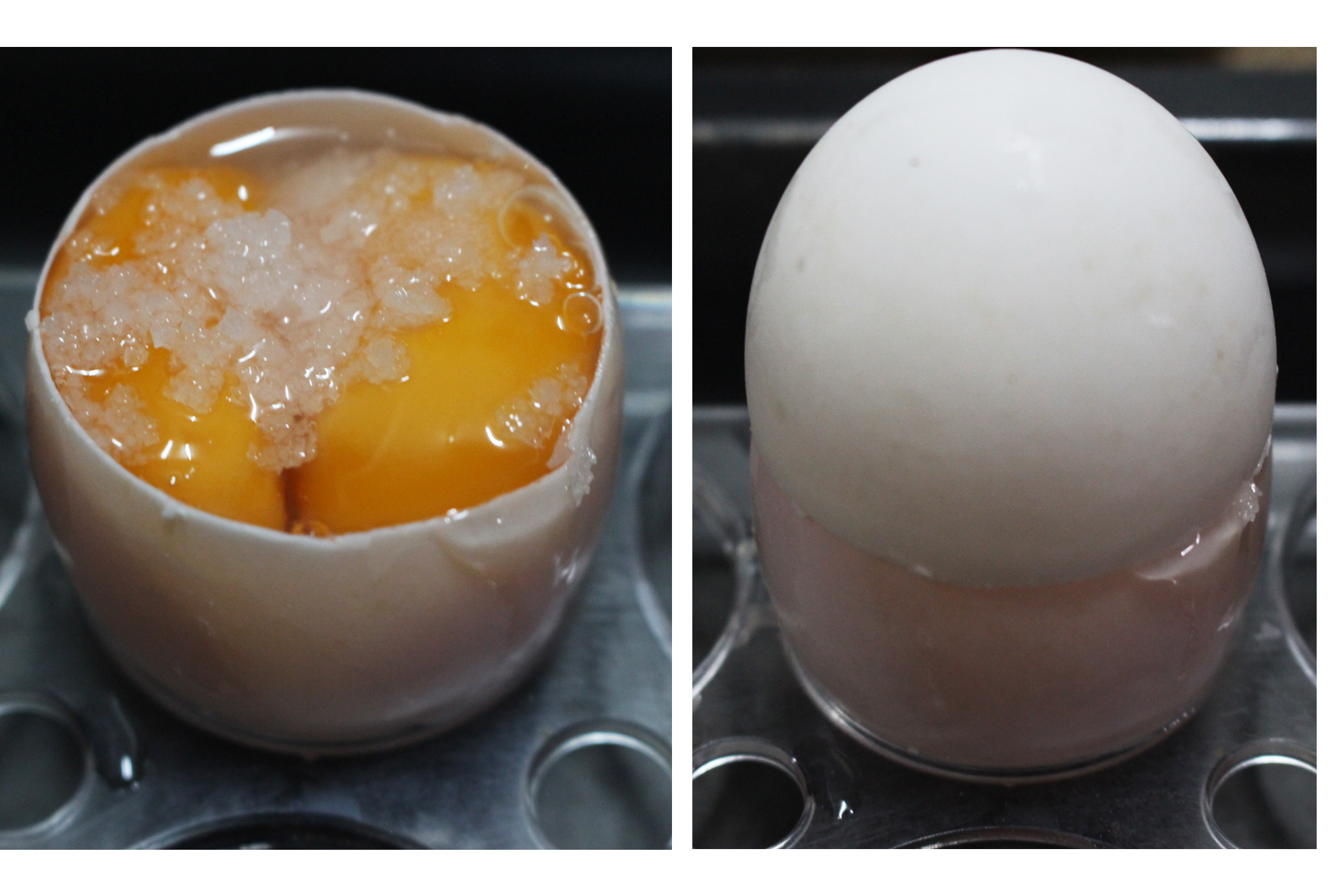
Traditional method

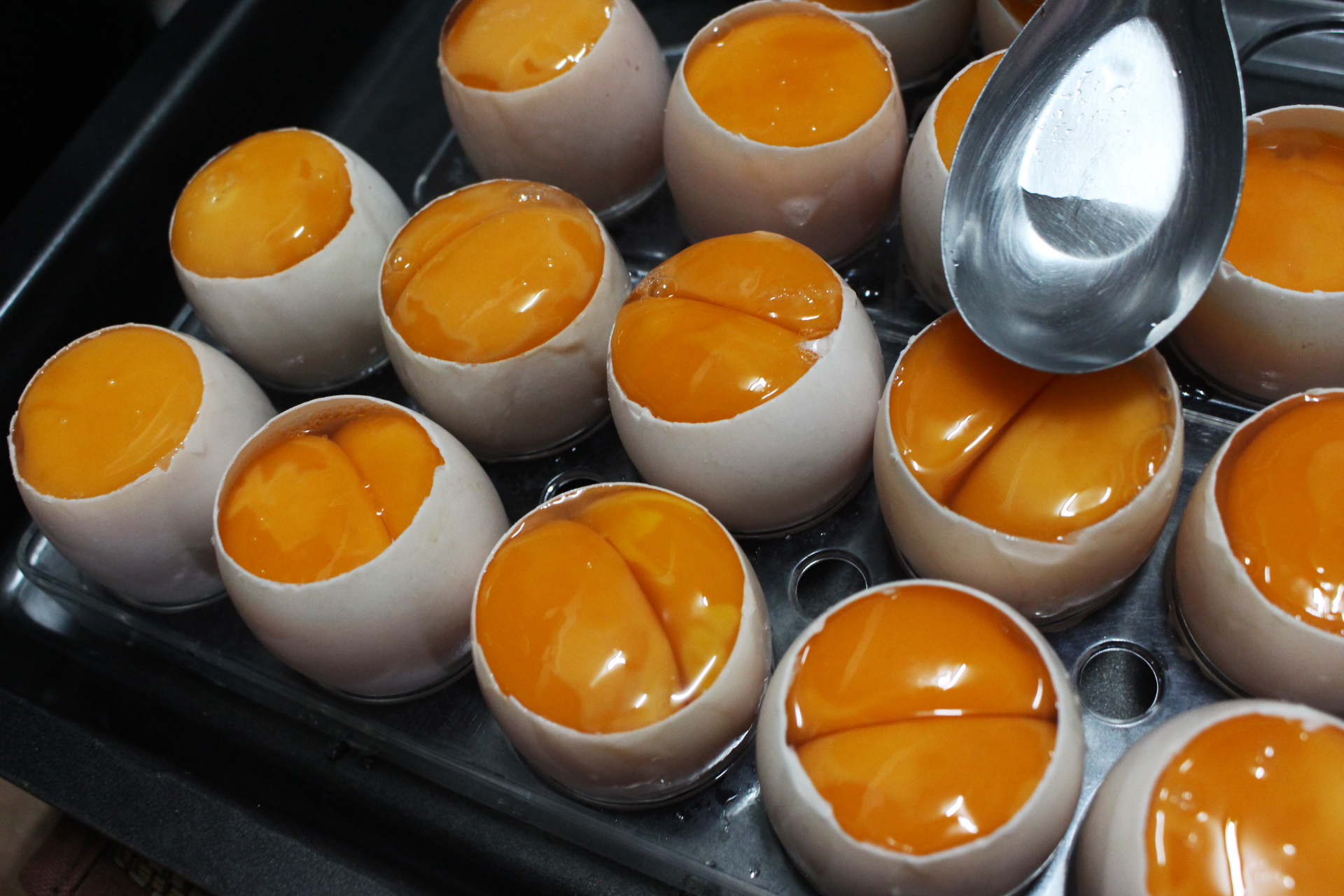
Modern method

=== Traditional ===
The traditional method for producing khai khrop is to cut the duck egg shell into half, add salt to the base of the shell, put two yolks in a shell and add salt again on top then dry it in sunlight for several days. If there is no time for sun-drying, the leftover egg shell is used as a cover to protect the yolks from insects and dirt. This process become the name of khai khrop. In Thai, khai means "egg" and khrop means "cover" (Remawadee, 2010). After the sun-drying process is complete, khai khrop is cooked by steaming, which makes it last for several days.

== Uses ==
Khai khrop can be eaten without further preparation, on their own or as a side dish. In southern Thailand, local people eat khai khrop as a side dish with rice and curry, or with khao tom. In some areas, khai khrops are sliced, mixed with chopped vegetables, chopped chilli, soy sauce, sugar and lime juice to become a spicy salad.

Khai khrop are very similar to salted duck eggs but they have no egg white and the yolks are softer and less salty.

== See also ==
- List of egg dishes
- List of steamed foods
- Salted duck egg
- Century egg

== Citations ==
- Monkeytan. (2014, May 15). Mthai food. Retrieved January 11, 2017, from http://food.mthai.com: http://food.mthai.com/food-inbox/90416.html
- Remawadee. (2010, May 14). ไข่ครอบ หัวเขา สงขลา. Retrieved from remawadee.com: http://www.remawadee.com/songkra/Cover-Eggs.html
- "Steamed Duck Egg Yolk – Kai Krob". templeofthai.com. 15 January 2011.
- ครูฑูรย์. (2012, January 10). ไข่คู่ - ไข่ครอบ. Retrieved January 22, 2017, from GotoKnow: https://www.gotoknow.org/posts/459943
- รัตนะ, ส. (2013, November 9). 'ไข่ครอบหัวเขา'โอท็อปสงขลา. Retrieved January 22, 2017, from Komchadluek: https://web.archive.org/web/20181211115838/http://www.komchadluek.net/news/lifestyle/172312
