= Creative Cities Network =

UNESCO project

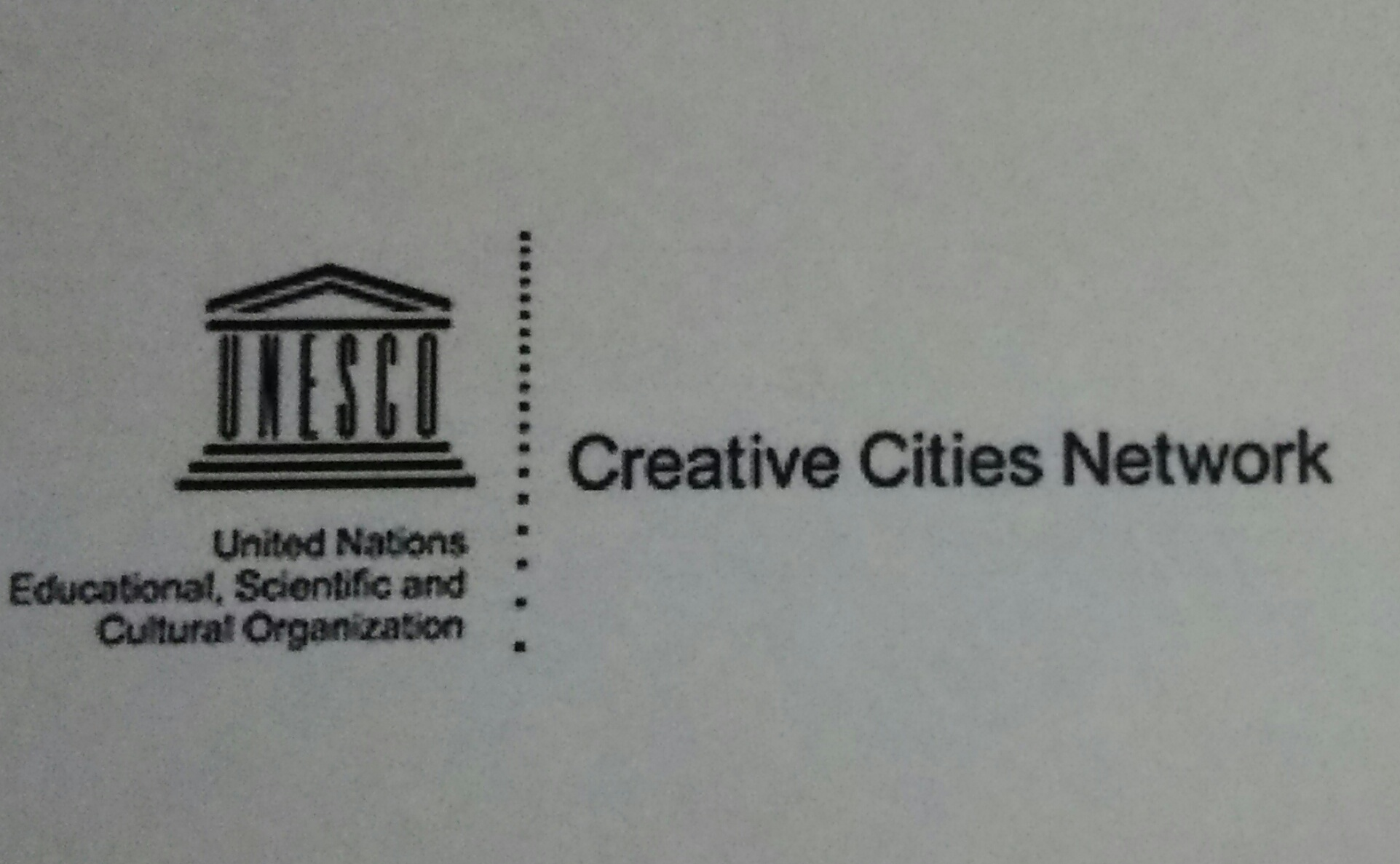
Photograph of the Creative City network logo in Yokohama, Japan

The UNESCO Creative Cities Network (UCCN) is a flagship city programme of UNESCO launched in 2004 to promote cooperation among cities which have recognized culture and creativity as strategic drivers of sustainable urban development. As of 2022, there are almost 300 cities from around 90 countries in the network.

The network aims to foster mutual international cooperation with and between member cities committed to invest in creativity as a driver for sustainable urban development, social inclusion and cultural vibrancy. The Network recognizes the following creative fields:

- The overall situation and activities within the Network is reported in the UCCN Membership Monitoring Reports, each for a four-year period for a particular city.
- The Network recognizes the concept of creative tourism, defined as travel associated with creative experience and participation.

== Architecture ==
In 2025, UNESCO created the City of Architecture designation, with the inaugural cities being Bistrita, Kashan, Lusail, Quito, and Rovaniemi.
